= Moral insanity =

Obsolete term for type of mental disorder

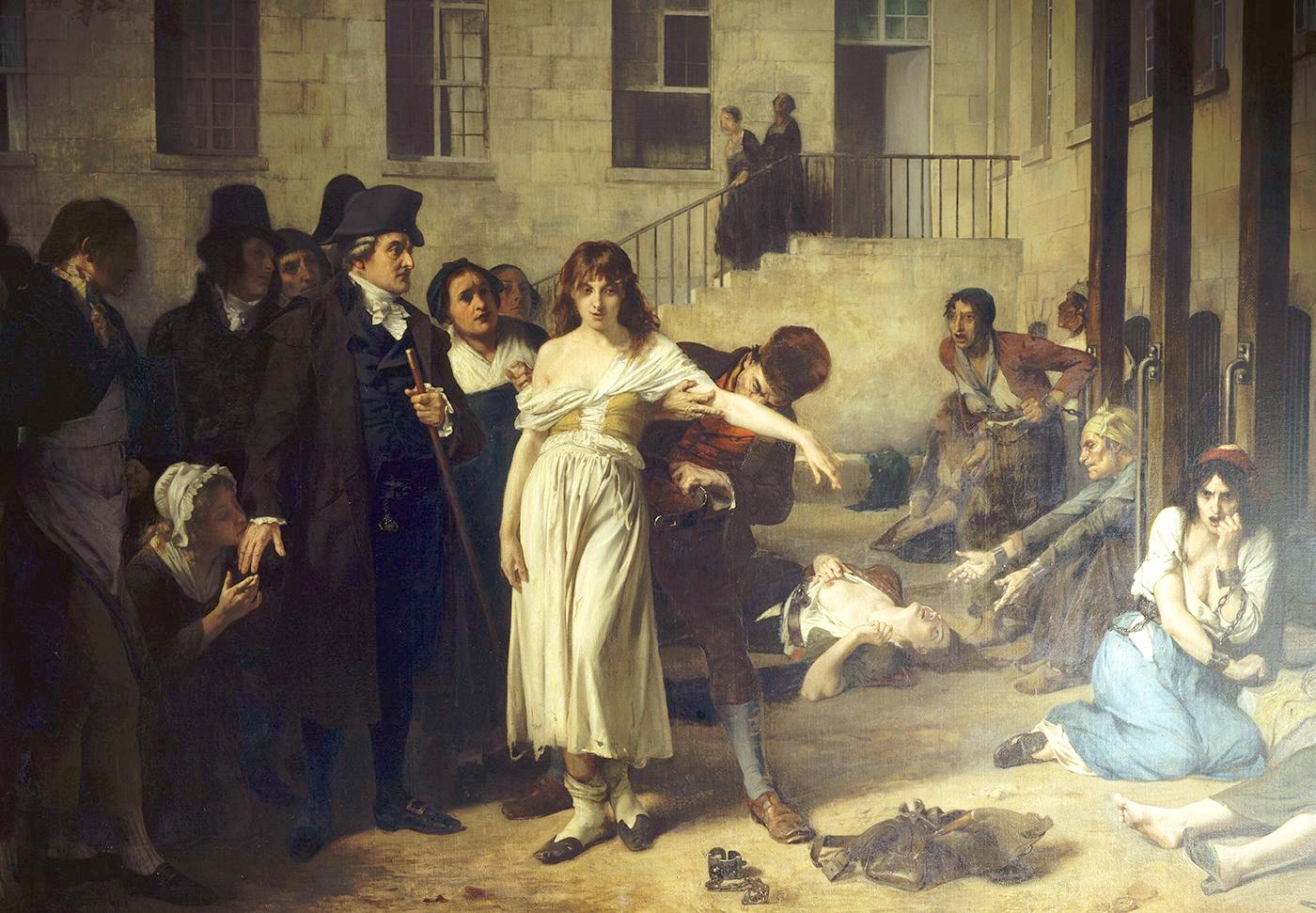
French psychiatrist Philippe Pinel (1745-1826) releasing “lunatics” from their chains at the Salpêtrière asylum in Paris in 1795

Moral insanity referred to a type of mental disorder consisting of abnormal emotions and behaviours in the apparent absence of intellectual impairments, delusions, or hallucinations. It was an accepted diagnosis in Europe and America through the second half of the 19th century.

The physician James Cowles Prichard first used the phrase to describe a mental disorder in 1835 in his Treatise on insanity and other disorders affecting the mind. He defined moral insanity as: "madness consisting in a morbid perversion of the natural feelings, affections, inclinations, temper, habits, moral dispositions, and natural impulses, without any remarkable disorder or defect of the interest or knowing and reasoning faculties, and particularly without any insane illusion or hallucinations."

The concept of moral insanity was indebted to the work of physician Philippe Pinel, which was acknowledged by Prichard. Pinel had described mental diseases of only partial, affective, insanity. His concept Manie sans délire (Latin – mania sine delirio; French – folie raisonnante or folie lucide raisonnante, monomanie affective; German – Moralisches Irresein) referred to insanity without delusion. That is, the person was thought to be mad in one area only and thus the personality of the individual might be distorted but his or her intellectual faculties were unimpaired.

The term 'moral', at that time and taken originally from French, could mean the affective, or interior depth of an individual rather than necessarily a reference to their ethics.

== Diagnostic schemes ==
The term 'moral insanity' had been used earlier by Thomas Arnold (physician) and Benjamin Rush in referring to what they saw as a result of madness – a disruption or perversion of the emotions or moral sense. This usage had little to do with Prichard's diagnostic definition of the term as a form of madness itself, however.

Overall, Prichard defined insanity as a, "chronic disease, manifested by deviations from the healthy and natural state of the mind." He then proposed four broad categories. Moral insanity was for disorders that only seemed to arise from a person's feelings and habits, not his intellect. The other three types involved increasing degrees of intellectual abnormality: a partial derangement that was limited to certain trains of thought; a full mania, by which was meant 'raving madness' regardless of topic; and lastly, a breakdown of any connections between ideas, referred to as incoherence or dementia.

Prichard considered that some early nosologists, namely Sauvages, Sagar and Linnaeus, had distinguished between medical conditions with hallucinations and those involving depraved appetites or feelings. But he credits Pinel as the first in psychiatry to clearly distinguish madness without delerium, in opposition to Locke's widely accepted axiom that insanity always stemmed from faulty intellectual connections or mistaken perceptions. However, Pinel's concept focused on a frenzy of the passions, particularly involving rage and violence. For Prichard the typical syndrome was more a form of extreme eccentricity, and he would later refer to Pinel's type as a madness of the instincts.

Prichard was an adherent of what was known faculty psychology, which attempted to divide the mind into different functions or abilities, but not phrenology, which attempted to locate them below specific parts of the skull. He was also influenced by a school of thought associated with the physician Nasse, which posited disorders of emotions or temperament rather than intellect. Prichard also considered a complex categorical scheme developed by Heinroth, concluding that a number of disorders in different divisions of that scheme would be more simply gathered under the heading 'moral insanity'. He suggested the category could also be termed 'parapathia', or alternatively 'pathomania' by analogy with monomania.

The latter term had been introduced by the physician Esquirol, who had succeeded Pinel, to refer to a form of insanity where there is a fixation or excess in only one area. It was also used widely by Étienne-Jean Georget. It was theorized to be caused by a split in the faculties of the mind. Prichard considered his first category of intellectual (rather than moral) insanity, to be equivalent to monomania. This in turn meant that the symptoms of moral insanity could increase, causing an overall degeneration into monomania. "On the surface, monomania can thus appear even more circumscribed a form of derangement than moral insanity." However, Esquirol by contrast considered moral insanity to be simply one form of monomania.

== Context ==
Contemporary misunderstanding of the term derives from the double meaning of the word "moral" in the nineteenth century context. According to Erdmann Mueller in a comprehensive 1899 treatise on moral insanity: "the word moral in the concept moral insanity is derived from the word affective in Esquirol's terminology, and the translation of moral as virtuous or ethical is the result of a misunderstanding due to the double meaning of the word." According to Pinel, manie sans délire (mania without delusion) had no relation to the moral faculty. Moral insanity was a form of mental derangement in which the intellectual faculties were unaffected, but the affects or emotions were damaged, causing patients to be carried away by some kind of furious instinct (instincte fureur).

Likewise, the term moral treatment referred to a set of psychosocial techniques rather than necessarily defined as ethical practice. Under Pinel's guidance, patients were freed from chains and shackles. Prichard used a mixture of moral treatment techniques as well as traditional medical treatments of bleeding, purging, vomiting etc.

Prichard appeared to view the disorder in terms of both affect and morality. As a religious and conservative man, he shared in some gloom about a perceived decline in morals and religion, and increase of selfishness. Some attributed this to socioeconomic developments related to industrialization or capitalism. Prichard saw it as an issue within human consciousness, identity and judgement; he was also influenced by theories that natural human emotions could become unbalanced in conditions of civilisation far removed from nature. However, he also linked moral insanity to a debasement of the more refined emotions, which he in turn saw as more associated with the affluent classes, such that a person still knew right from wrong but became unable to conduct themselves "with decency and propriety in the business of life". Prichard was also concerned to challenge the development of phrenology, which attempted to localise aspects of the mind and personality to particular areas of the brain, as assessed by the size of bumps in the skull. The alternative was to locate mental disorder in temperament, abstractly located in the visceral organs or nervous system in a then modern form of humorism, while maintaining that powers of judgement were a metaphysical or religious component.

Later, Maudsley discussed moral insanity as a sign of poor moral willpower or moral sense. DH Tuke asserted that while it may appear to stem from the emotions, it was often due to a weakening of the 'higher centres' of will, and he thus suggested a new name 'inhibitory insanity'.

Both moral insanity and monomania were depicted in Victorian novels and movies of the time. They were similar in that they were both abnormalities of an otherwise normal mind, though the former was a systemic malfunction and the latter an isolated aberration.

The context leading to the conceptualization of this diagnostic category was undoubtedly borne out of the frustration of alienists (the term is approximately equivalent to the modern day one of psychiatrist) by the definition of madness provided by John Locke in which delusional symptoms were required. In legal trials this definition had proved to be a great source of embarrassment to alienists because unless delusional symptoms could be clearly shown judges would not consider a plea of insanity.

In terms of involuntary commitment of individuals alleged to be insane, Prichard was cautious in using the diagnosis of moral insanity, partly because the educated classes that were typical clients tended to hold the asylum system in very low regard. Prichard tended to suggest it came down to an assessment of individual mental state and ability. He emphasized property and social order as the rationale for confinement: "Of all these arrangements the maintenance of public order is the principal object, and the second is the preservation of the property belonging to the lunatic and the interest of his family."

== Implications ==
Ultimately, the concept of moral insanity did not change the orthodox legal defense of insanity which required the clear presence of delusion, as embodied in the M'Naghten rules in 1843 which are still referenced today. Nevertheless, modern conceptions of responsibility have been forged in part through the medical and legal exchanges over moral insanity, including anticipations of the diagnosis in the writings of Benjamin Rush, in the context of concepts of free will associated with religious Common Sense Realism.

Moral insanity came to be increasingly seen as a form of genetically inherited degeneracy, and toward the end of the 19th century and into the 20th century converged with ideas of moral imbecility and deficiency, as well as with an anti-vice moral hygiene movement.

Several writers have sounded caution over the notion that the diagnostic category of moral insanity was a direct forerunner of psychopathic disorder. As stated by the historian F.A. Whitlock: "there [is] not the remotest resemblance between their examples [Pinel's and Prichard's] and what today would be classed as psychopathic personality." Prichard's "moral insanity" was a catch-all term of behavioural disorders whose only feature in common was an absence of delusions: it is not cognate with the modern diagnostic category of antisocial personality disorder. However, Whitlock has suggested that the diagnosis gradually changed into moral imbecility over the turn of the century and that in turn transformed into something like the current concept of psychopathy.

The psychiatrist Koch sought to make the moral insanity concept more scientific and suggested in 1891 the phrase 'psychopathic inferiority' (later personality) be used instead. This referred to continual and rigid patterns of misconduct or dysfunction in the absence of apparent intellectual disability or illness. The diagnosis was meant to imply a congenital disorder, and to be made without moral judgement, though Koch has been described as deeply rooted in a Christian faith. Toward the mid 20th century the terminology of the 'psychopathic' would become specifically associated with an aggressive and anti-social personality. A more general concept of character disorders came into use by psychoanalysts, and psychiatry later adopted the current terminology of personality disorders.

== See also ==
- Insanity
- Moral treatment
