= Pargeter =

A pargeter is a craftsman employed in pargeting.

Pargeter may also refer to:

- Edith Pargeter (1913–1995) (nom de plume Ellis Peters), English author of works in many categories, especially history and historical fiction
- Lucy Pargeter (born 1977), English actress
- Alison Pargeter, English actress
- Margaret Pargeter, nom de plume for a popular writer of romance novels
- William Pargeter (1760–1810), English physician

== Fictional characters ==
- A family in The Archers, a radio soap opera
