= Moral treatment =

Mental disorder intervention

Moral treatment was an approach to mental disorder based on humane psychosocial care or moral discipline that emerged in the 18th century and came to the fore for much of the 19th century, deriving partly from psychiatry or psychology and partly from religious or moral concerns. The movement is particularly associated with reform and development of the asylum system in Western Europe at that time. It fell into decline as a distinct method by the 20th century, however, due to overcrowding and misuse of asylums and the predominance of biomedical methods. The movement is widely seen as influencing certain areas of psychiatric practice up to the present day. The approach has been praised for freeing sufferers from shackles and barbaric physical treatments, instead considering such things as emotions and social interactions, but has also been criticised for blaming or oppressing individuals according to the standards of a particular social class or religion.

== Context ==
Moral treatment developed in the context of the Enlightenment and its focus on social welfare and individual rights. At the start of the 18th century, the "insane" were typically viewed as wild animals who had lost their reason. They were not held morally responsible but were subject to scorn and ridicule by the public, sometimes kept in madhouses in appalling conditions, often in chains and neglected for years or subject to numerous torturous "treatments" including whipping, beating, bloodletting, shocking, starvation, irritant chemicals, and isolation. There were some attempts to argue for more psychological understanding and therapeutic environments. For example, in England John Locke popularized the idea that there is a degree of madness in most people because emotions can cause people to incorrectly associate ideas and perceptions, and William Battie suggested a more psychological approach, but conditions generally remained poor. The treatment of King George III also led to increased optimism about the possibility of therapeutic interventions.

== Early development ==
=== Italy ===
Under the Enlightened concern of Grand Duke Pietro Leopoldo in Florence, Italian physician Vincenzo Chiarugi instituted humanitarian reforms. Between 1785 and 1788 he managed to outlaw chains as a means of restraint at the Santa Dorotea hospital, building on prior attempts made there since the 1750s. From 1788 at the newly renovated St. Bonifacio Hospital he did the same, and led the development of new rules establishing a more humane regime.

=== France ===
The ex-patient Jean-Baptiste Pussin and his wife Margueritte, and the physician Philippe Pinel (1745–1826), are also recognized as the first instigators of more humane conditions in asylums. From the early 1780s, Pussin had been in charge of the mental hospital division of the La Bicêtre, an asylum in Paris for male patients. From the mid-1780s, Pinel was publishing articles on links between emotions, social conditions and insanity. In 1792 (formally recorded in 1793), Pinel became the chief physician at the Bicetre. Pussin showed Pinel how really knowing the patients meant they could be managed with sympathy and kindness as well as authority and control. In 1797, Pussin first freed patients of their chains and banned physical punishment, although straitjackets could be used instead. Patients were allowed to move freely about the hospital grounds, and eventually dark dungeons were replaced with sunny, well-ventilated rooms. Pussin and Pinel's approach was seen as remarkably successful and they later brought similar reforms to a mental hospital in Paris for female patients, La Salpetrière. Pinel's student and successor, Jean Esquirol (1772–1840), went on to help establish 10 new mental hospitals that operated on the same principles. There was an emphasis on the selection and supervision of attendants in order to establish a suitable setting to facilitate psychological work, and particularly on the employment of ex-patients as they were thought most likely to refrain from inhumane treatment while being able to stand up to pleading, menaces, or complaining.

Pinel used the term "traitement moral" for the new approach. At that time "moral", in French and internationally, had a mixed meaning of either psychological/emotional (mental) or moral (ethical). Pinel distanced himself from the more religious work that was developed by the Tukes, and in fact considered that excessive religiosity could be harmful. He sometimes took a moral stance himself, however, as to what he considered to be mentally healthy and socially appropriate.

=== England ===
English Quaker William Tuke (1732–1822) independently led the development of a radical new type of institution in northern England, following the death of a fellow Quaker in a local asylum in 1790. In 1796, with the help of fellow Quakers and others, he founded the York Retreat, where eventually about 30 patients lived as part of a small community in a quiet country house and engaged in a combination of rest, talk, and manual work. Rejecting medical theories and techniques, the efforts of the York Retreat centered around minimizing restraints and cultivating rationality and moral strength. The entire Tuke family became known as founders of moral treatment. They created a family-style ethos and patients performed chores to give them a sense of contribution. There was a daily routine of both work and leisure time. If patients behaved well, they were rewarded; if they behaved poorly, there was some minimal use of restraints or instilling of fear. The patients were told that treatment depended on their conduct. In this sense, the patient's moral autonomy was recognized. William Tuke's grandson, Samuel Tuke, published an influential work in the early 19th century on the methods of the retreat; Pinel's Treatise on Insanity had by then been published, and Samuel Tuke translated his term as "moral treatment".

=== Scotland ===
A very different background to the moral approach may be discerned in Scotland. Interest in mental illness was a feature of the Edinburgh medical school in the eighteenth century, with influential teachers including William Cullen (1710–1790) and Robert Whytt (1714–1766) emphasising the clinical importance of psychiatric disorders. In 1816, the phrenologist Johann Spurzheim (1776–1832) visited Edinburgh and lectured on his craniological and phrenological concepts, arousing considerable hostility, not least from the theologically doctrinaire Church of Scotland. Some of the medical students, however, notably William A.F. Browne (1805–1885), responded very positively to this materialist conception of the nervous system and, by implication, of mental disorder. George Combe (1788–1858), an Edinburgh solicitor, became an unrivalled exponent of phrenological thinking, and his brother, Andrew Combe (1797–1847), who was later appointed a physician to Queen Victoria, wrote a phrenological treatise entitled Observations on Mental Derangement (1831). George and Andrew Combe exerted a rather dictatorial authority over the Edinburgh Phrenological Society, and in the mid-1820s manipulated the de facto expulsion of the Christian phrenologists.

This tradition of medical materialism found a ready partner in the Lamarckian biology purveyed by the naturalist Robert Edmond Grant (1793–1874) who exercised a striking influence on the young Charles Darwin during his time as a medical student in Edinburgh in 1826/1827. William Browne advanced his own versions of evolutionary phrenology at influential meetings of the Edinburgh Phrenological Society, the Royal Medical Society and the Plinian Society. Later, as superintendent of Sunnyside Royal Hospital (the Montrose Asylum) from 1834 to 1838, and, more extravagantly, at the Crichton Royal in Dumfries from 1838 to 1859, Browne implemented his general approach of moral management, indicating a clinical sensitivity to the social groupings, shifting symptom patterns, dreams and art-works of the patients in his care. Browne summarised his moral approach to asylum management in his book (actually the transcripts of five public lectures) which he entitled What Asylums Were, Are, and Ought To Be. His achievements with this style of psychiatric practice were rewarded with his appointment as a Commissioner in Lunacy for Scotland, and by his election to the Presidency of the Medico-Psychological Association in 1866. Browne's eldest surviving son, James Crichton-Browne (1840–1938), did much to extend his father's work in psychiatry, and, on 29 February 1924, he delivered a remarkable lecture The Story of the Brain, in which he recorded a generous appreciation of the role of the phrenologists in the early foundations of psychiatric thought and practice.

=== United States ===
A key figure in the early spread of moral treatment in the United States was Benjamin Rush (1745–1813), an eminent physician at Pennsylvania Hospital. He limited his practice to mental illness and developed innovative, humane approaches to treatment. He required that the hospital hire intelligent and sensitive attendants to work closely with patients, reading and talking to them and taking them on regular walks. He also suggested that it would be therapeutic for doctors to give small gifts to their patients every so often. However, Rush's treatment methods included bloodletting (bleeding), purging, hot and cold baths, mercury, and strapping patients to spinning boards and "tranquilizer" chairs.

A Boston schoolteacher, Dorothea Dix (1802–1887), also helped make humane care a public and a political concern in the US. On a restorative trip to England for a year, she met Samuel Tuke. In 1841 she visited a local prison to teach Sunday school and was shocked at the conditions for the inmates and the treatment of those with mental illnesses. She began to investigate and crusaded on the issue in Massachusetts and all over the country. She supported the moral treatment model of care. She spoke to many state legislatures about the horrible sights she had witnessed at the prisons and called for reform. Dix fought for new laws and greater government funding to improve the treatment of people with mental disorders from 1841 until 1881, and personally helped establish 32 state hospitals that were to offer moral treatment. Many asylums were built according to the so-called Kirkbride Plan.

== Consequences ==
The moral treatment movement was initially opposed by those in the mental health profession. By the mid-19th century, however, many psychologists had adopted the strategy. They became advocates of moral treatment, but argued that since the mentally ill often had separate physical/organic problems, medical approaches were also necessary. Making this argument stick has been described as an important step in the profession's eventual success at securing a monopoly on the treatment of "lunacy".

The moral treatment movement had a huge influence on asylum construction and practice. Many countries were introducing legislation requiring local authorities to provide asylums for the local population, and they were increasingly designed and run along moral treatment lines. Additional "non-restraint movements" also developed. There was great belief in the curability of mental disorders, particularly in the US, and statistics were reported showing high recovery rates. They were later much criticized, particularly for not differentiating between new admissions and re-admissions (i.e. those who hadn't really achieved a sustained recovery). It has been noted, however, that the cure statistics showed a decline from the 1830s onwards, particularly sharply in the second half of the century, which has been linked to the dream of small, curative asylums giving way to large, centralized, overcrowded asylums.

There was also criticism from some ex-patients and their allies. By the mid-19th century in England, the Alleged Lunatics' Friend Society was proclaiming that the new moral treatment was a form of social repression achieved "by mildness and coaxing, and by solitary confinement"; that its implication that the "alleged lunatics" needed re-educating meant it treated them as if they were children incapable of making their own decisions; and that it failed to properly inform people of their rights or involve them in discussion about their treatment. The Society was suspicious of the tranquility of the asylums, suggesting that patients were simply being crushed and then discharged to live a "milk sop" (meek) existence in society.

In the context of industrialization, public asylums expanded in size and number. Bound up in this was the development of the profession of psychiatry, able to expand with large numbers of inmates collected together. By the end of the 19th century and into the 20th, these large out-of-town asylums had become overcrowded, misused, isolated and run-down. The therapeutic principles had often been neglected along with the patients. Moral management techniques had turned into mindless institutional routines within an authoritarian structure. Consideration of costs quickly overrode ideals. There was compromise over decoration—no longer a homey, family atmosphere but drab and minimalist. There was an emphasis on security, custody, high walls, closed doors, shutting people off from society, and physical restraint was often used. It is well documented that there was very little therapeutic activity, and medics were little more than administrators who seldom attended to patients and mainly then for other, somatic, problems. Any hope of moral treatment or a family atmosphere was "obliterated". In 1827 the average number of asylum inmates in Britain was 166; by 1930 it was 1221. The relative proportion of the public officially diagnosed as insane grew.

Although the Retreat had been based on a non-medical approach and environment, medically based reformers emulating it spoke of "patients" and "hospitals". Asylum "nurses" and attendants, once valued as a core part of providing good holistic care, were often scapegoated for the failures of the system. Towards the end of the 19th century, somatic theories, pessimism in prognosis, and custodialism had returned. Theories of hereditary degeneracy and eugenics took over, and in the 20th century the concepts of mental hygiene and mental health developed. From the mid 20th century, however, a process of antipsychiatry and deinstitutionalization occurred in many countries in the West, and asylums in many areas were gradually replaced with more local community mental health services.

In the 1960s, Michel Foucault renewed the argument that moral treatment had really been a new form of moral oppression, replacing physical oppression, and his arguments were widely adopted within the antipsychiatry movement. Foucault was interested in ideas of "the other" and how society defines normalcy by defining the abnormal and its relationship to the normal. A patient in the asylum had to go through four moral syntheses: silence, recognition in the mirror, perpetual judgment, and the apotheosis of the medical personage. The mad were ignored and verbally isolated. They were made to see madness in others and then in themselves until they felt guilt and remorse. The doctor, despite his lack of medical knowledge about the underlying processes, had all powers of authority and defined insanity. Thus Foucault argues that the "moral" asylum is "not a free realm of observation, diagnosis, and therapeutics; it is a juridical space where one is accused, judged, and condemned." Foucault's reassessment was succeeded by a more balanced view, recognizing that the manipulation and ambiguous "kindness" of Tuke and Pinel may have been preferable to the harsh coercion and physical "treatments" of previous generations, while aware of moral treatment's less benevolent aspects and its potential to deteriorate into repression.

The moral treatment movement is widely seen as influencing psychiatric practice up to the present day, including specifically therapeutic communities (although they were intended to be less repressive); occupational therapy and Soteria houses. The Recovery model is said to have echoes of the concept of moral treatment.

== See also ==
- Erwadi fire incident
- Humane treatment of the mentally ill
- Moral insanity
- The Retreat, the first institution to implement moral treatment
- Testimony of equality describing actions of the Quakers towards equality
