= Philippe Pinel =

French psychiatrist (1745–1826)

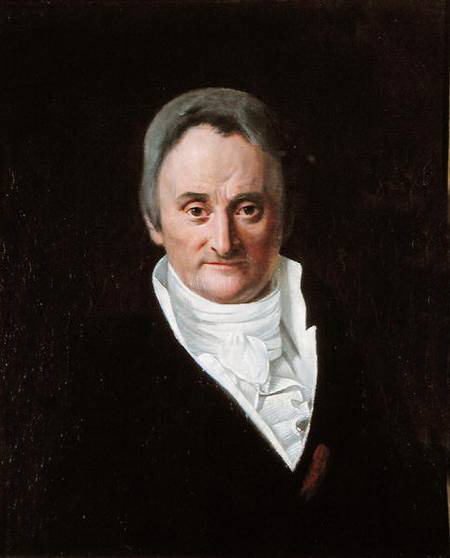
- Philippe Pinel, portrait by Anna Mérimée
- Born: 20 April 1745; Jonquières, France
- Died: 25 October 1826 (aged 81); Paris, France
- Scientific career
- Fields: Psychiatry

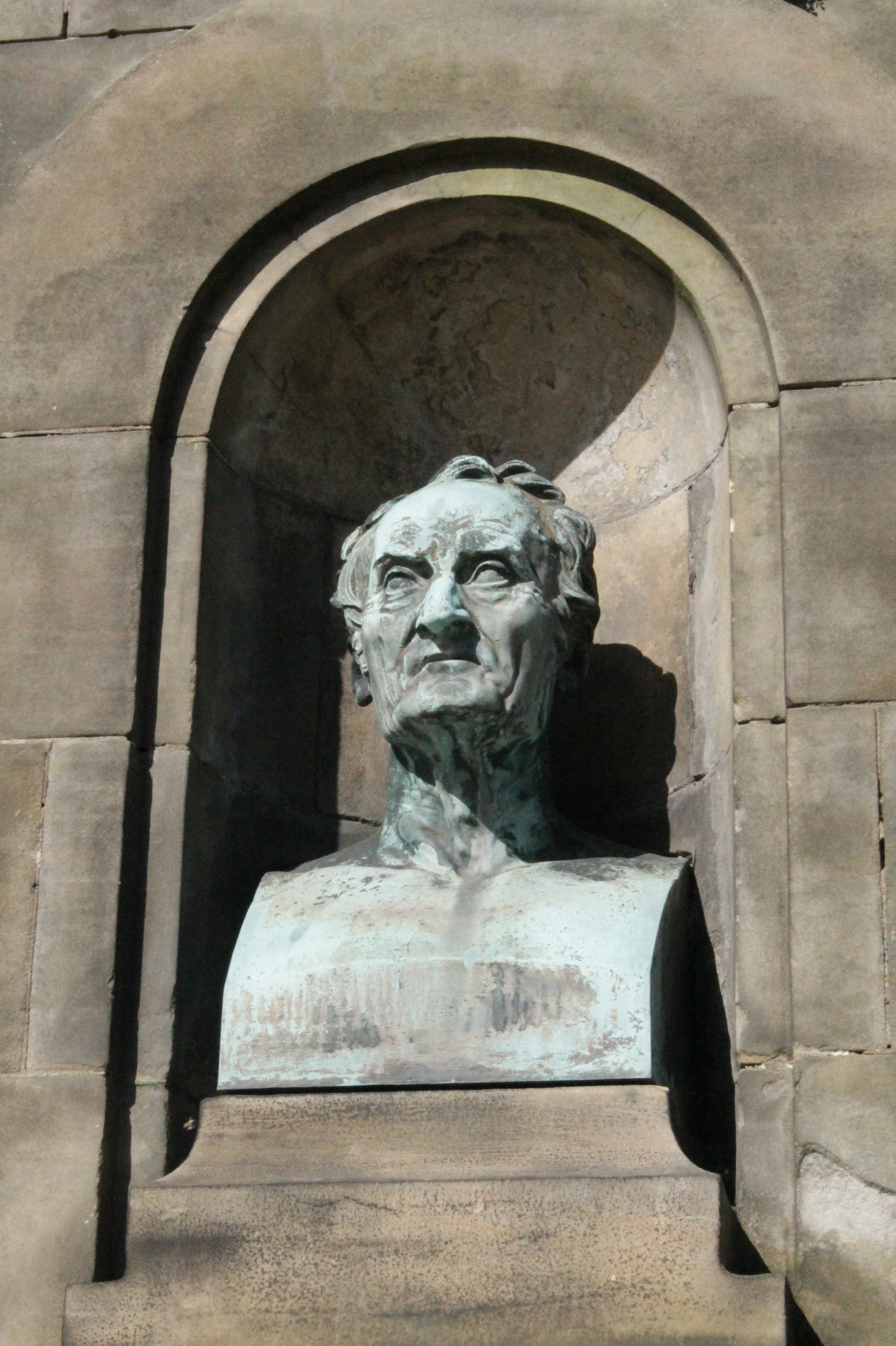
Bust of Philippe Pinel on the Pinel Memorial, Royal Edinburgh Hospital

Philippe Pinel (French: [pinɛl]; 20 April 1745 – 25 October 1826) was a French physician, precursor of psychiatry and incidentally a zoologist. He was instrumental in the development of a more humane psychological approach to the custody and care of psychiatric patients, referred to today as moral therapy. He worked for the abolition of the shackling of mental patients by chains and, more generally, for the humanisation of their treatment. He also made notable contributions to the classification of mental disorders and has been described by some as "the father of modern psychiatry".

After the French Revolution, Dr. Pinel changed the way we look at the mentally ill (or "aliénés", "alienated" in English) by claiming that they can be understood and cured. An 1809 description of a case that Pinel recorded in the second edition of his textbook on insanity is regarded by some as the earliest evidence for the existence of the form of mental disorder later known as dementia praecox or schizophrenia, although Emil Kraepelin is generally accredited with its first conceptualisation.

As the "father of modern psychiatry", he was credited with the first classification of mental illnesses. He had a great influence on psychiatry and the treatment of the alienated in Europe and the United States.

== Early life ==
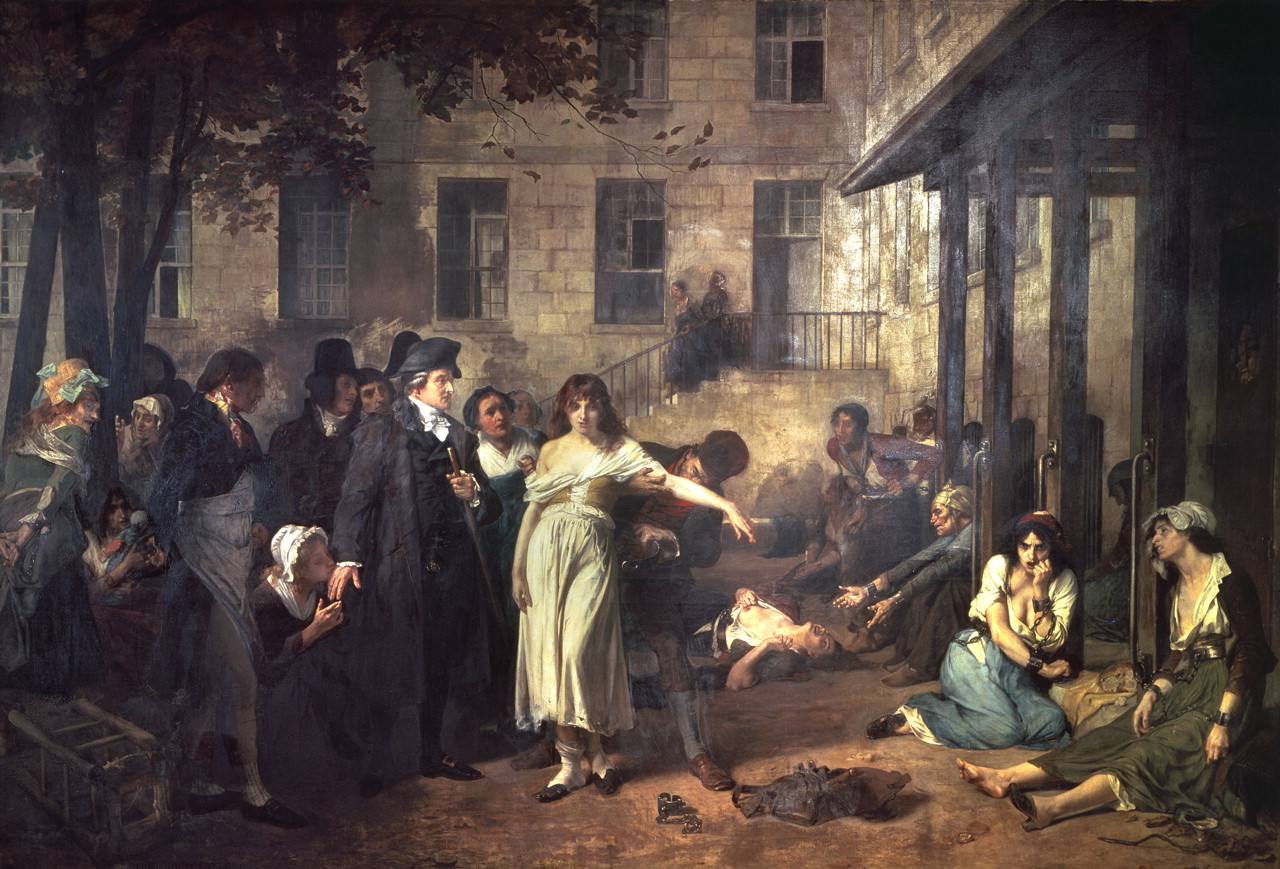
Dr. Philippe Pinel at the Salpêtrière, 1795 by Tony Robert-Fleury. Pinel ordering the removal of chains from patients at the Paris Asylum for insane women.

Pinel was born in Jonquières, the South of France, in the modern department of Tarn. He was the son and nephew of physicians. After receiving a degree from the faculty of medicine in Toulouse, he studied an additional four years at the Faculty of Medicine of Montpellier. He arrived in Paris in 1778.

He spent fifteen years earning his living as a writer, translator, and editor because the restrictive regulations of the old regime prevented him from practicing medicine in Paris. The faculty did not recognize a degree from a provincial university like Toulouse. He failed twice in a competition which would have awarded him funds to continue his studies. In the second competition, the jury stressed his ‘painful’ mediocrity in all areas of medical knowledge, an assessment seemingly so grossly incompatible with his later intellectual accomplishments that political motives have been suggested. Discouraged, Pinel considered emigrating to America. In 1784 he became editor of the medical journal the Gazette de santé, a four-page weekly. He was also known among natural scientists as a regular contributor to the Journal de physique. He studied mathematics, translated medical works into French, and undertook botanical expeditions.

At about this time he began to develop an intense interest in the study of mental illness. The incentive was a personal one. A friend had developed a ‘nervous melancholy’ that had ‘degenerated into mania’ and resulted in suicide. What Pinel regarded as an unnecessary tragedy due to gross mismanagement seems to have haunted him. It led him to seek employment at one of the best-known private sanatoria for the treatment of insanity in Paris. He remained there for five years prior to the Revolution, gathering observations on insanity and beginning to formulate his views on its nature and treatment.

Pinel was an Ideologue, a disciple of the abbé de Condillac. He was also a clinician who believed that medical truth was derived from clinical experience. Hippocrates was his model.

During the 1780s, Pinel was invited to join the salon of Madame Helvétius. He was in sympathy with the French Revolution. After the revolution, friends he had met at Madame Helvétius’ salon came to power. In August 1793 Pinel was appointed "physician of the infirmeries" at Bicêtre Hospital. At the time it housed about four thousand imprisoned men—criminals, petty offenders, syphilitics, pensioners and about two hundred mental patients. Pinel’s patrons hoped that his appointment would lead to therapeutic initiatives. His experience at the private sanatoria made him a good candidate for the job.

== The Bicêtre and Salpêtrière ==
Soon after his appointment to Bicêtre Hospital, Pinel became interested in the seventh ward where 200 mentally ill men were housed. He asked for a report on these inmates. A few days later, he received a table with comments from the "governor" Jean-Baptiste Pussin. In the 1770s Pussin had been successfully treated for scrofula at Bicêtre; and, following a familiar pattern, he was eventually recruited, along with his wife, Marguerite Jubline, on to the staff of the hospice.

Appreciating Pussin's outstanding talent, Pinel virtually apprenticed himself to that unschooled but experienced custodian of the insane. His purpose in doing this was to "enrich the medical theory of mental illness with all the insights that the empirical approach affords". What he observed was a strict nonviolent, nonmedical management of mental patients that came to be called moral treatment or moral management, though psychological might be a more accurate term.

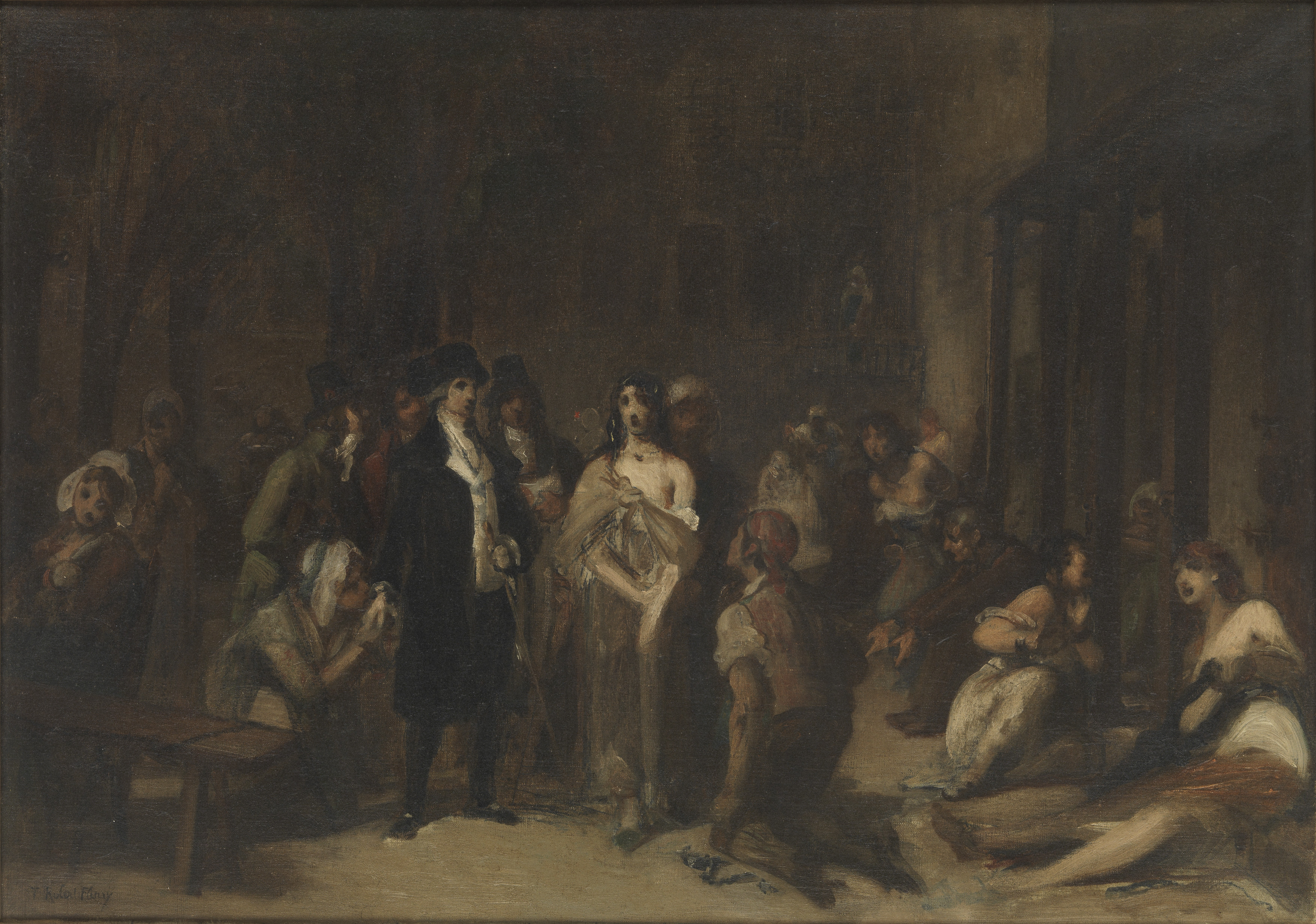
Pinel freeing the insane from their chains, 1876 by Tony Robert-Fleury

Although Pinel always gave Pussin the credit he deserved, a legend grew up about Pinel single-handedly liberating the insane from their chains at Bicêtre. This legend has been commemorated in paintings and prints, and has lived on for 200 years and is repeated in textbooks. In fact, it was Pussin who removed the iron shackles (but sometimes using straitjackets) at Bicêtre in 1797, after Pinel had left for the Salpêtrière. Pinel did remove the chains from patients at the Salpêtrière three years later, after Pussin joined him there. There is some suggestion that the Bicêtre myth was actually deliberately fabricated by Pinel's son, Dr Scipion Pinel, along with Pinel's foremost pupil, Dr Esquirol. The argument is that they were 'solidists', which meant then something akin to biological psychiatry with a focus on brain disease, and were embarrassed by Pinel's focus on psychological processes. In addition, unlike Philippe, they were both royalists.

While at Bicêtre, Pinel did away with bleeding, purging, and blistering in favor of a therapy that involved close contact with and careful observation of patients. Pinel visited each patient, often several times a day, and took careful notes over two years. He engaged them in lengthy conversations. His objective was to assemble a detailed case history and a natural history of the patient's illness.

In 1795, Pinel became chief physician of the Hospice de la Salpêtrière, a post that he retained for the rest of his life. The Salpêtrière was, at the time, like a large village, with seven thousand elderly indigent and ailing women, an entrenched bureaucracy, a teeming market and huge infirmaries. Pinel missed Pussin and in 1802 secured his transfer to the Salpêtrière. It has also been noted that a Catholic nursing order actually undertook most of the day to day care and understanding of the patients at Salpêtrière, and there were sometimes power struggles between Pinel and the nurses.

Pinel created an inoculation clinic in his service at the Salpêtrière in 1799, and the first vaccination in Paris was given there in April 1800.

In 1795 Pinel had also been appointed as a professor of medical pathology, a chair that he held for twenty years. He was briefly dismissed from this position in 1822, with ten other professors, suspected of political liberalism, but reinstated as an honorary professor shortly thereafter.

A statue in honour of Pinel now stands outside the Salpêtrière.

== Publications ==
In 1794, Pinel made public his essay Memoir on Madness, recently called a fundamental text of modern psychiatry. In it, Pinel makes the case for the careful psychological study of individuals over time, points out that insanity isn't always continuous, and calls for more humanitarian asylum practices.

In 1798, Pinel published an authoritative classification of diseases in his Nosographie philosophique ou méthode de l'analyse appliquée à la médecine. Although he is properly considered one of the founders of psychiatry, this book also establishes him as the last great nosologist of the eighteenth century. While the Nosographie appears completely dated today, it was so popular in its time that it went through six editions between its initial publication and 1818. Pinel based his nosology on ideas of William Cullen, employing the same biologically-inspired terminology of "genera" and "species" of disorder. Pinel's classification of mental disorder simplified Cullen's "neuroses" down to four basic types of mental disorder: melancholia, mania (insanity), dementia, and idiotism. Later editions added forms of "partial insanity" where only that of feelings which seem to be affected rather than reasoning ability.

The first mental derangement is called melancholia. The symptoms are described as "taciturnity, a thoughtful pensive air, gloomy suspicions, and a love of solitude". It is noted that Tiberius and Louis XI were subjected to this temperament. Louis was characterized by the imbalance between the state of bitterness and passion, gloom, love of solitude, and the embarrassment of artistic talents. However, Louis and Tiberius were similar in that they both were deceitful and planned a delusional trip to military sites. Eventually both were exiled, one to the Isle of Rhodes and the other to a province of Belgium. People with melancholia are often immersed with one idea that their whole attention is fixated on. On one hand they stay reserved for many years, withholding friendships and affection while on the other, there are some who make reasonable judgment and overcome the gloomy state. Melancholia can also express itself in polar opposite forms. The first is distinguished by an exalted sense of self-importance and unrealistic expectations such as attaining riches and power. The second form is marked by deep despair and great depression. Overall individuals with melancholia generally do not display acts of violence, though they may find it wildly fanciful. Depression and anxiety occurs habitually as well as frequent moroseness of character. Pinel remarks that melancholia can be explained by drunkenness, abnormalities in the structure of the skull, trauma in the skull, conditions of the skin, various psychological causes such as household disasters and religious extremism, and in women, menstruation and menopause.

The second mental derangement is called mania without delirium. It is described as madness independent of a disorder that impairs the intellectual faculties. The symptoms are described as perverse and disobedient. An instance where this type of species of mental derangement occurs where a mechanic, who was confined at the Asylum de Bicêtre, experienced violent outbursts of maniacal fury. The paroxysms consisted of a burning sensation located in the abdominal area that was accompanied by constipation and thirst. The symptom spread to the chest, neck, and face area. When it reached the temples, the pulsation of the arteries increased in those areas. The brain was affected to some length but nonetheless, the patient was able to reason and cohere to his ideas. One time, the mechanic experienced furious paroxysm at his own house, where he warned his wife to flee to avoid death. He also experienced the same periodical fury at the asylum where he plotted against the governor. The specific character of mania without delirium is that it can either be perpetual or sporadic. However, there was no reasonable change in the cognitive functions of the brain; only perversive thoughts of fury and a blind tendency to acts of violence.

The third mental derangement is called mania with delirium. It is mainly characterized by indulgence and fury, and affects cognitive functions. Sometimes it may be distinguished by a carefree, gay humor that can venture off path in incoherent and absurd suggestions. Other times it can be distinguished by prideful and imaginary claims to grandeur. Prisoners of this species are highly delusional. For example, they would proclaim having fought an important battle, or witness the prophet Mohammad conjuring wrath in the name of the Almighty. Some declaim ceaselessly with no evidence of things seen or heard while others saw illusions of objects in various forms and colors. Delirium sometimes persists with some degree of frenzied uproar for a period of years, but it can also be constant and the paroxysm of fury repeat at different intervals. The specific character of mania with delirium is the same as mania without delirium in the sense that it can either be continued or cyclical with regular or irregular paroxysms. It is marked by strong nervous excitement, accompanied by a deficit of one or more of the functions of the cognitive abilities with feelings of liveliness, depression or fury.

The fourth mental derangement is called dementia, or otherwise known as the abolition of thinking. The characteristics include thoughtlessness, extreme incorrectness, and wild abnormalities. For instance, a man who had been educated on the ancient nobility was marching on about the beginning of the revolution. He moved restlessly about the house, talking endlessly and shouting passionately on insignificant reasons. Dementia is usually accompanied by raging and rebellious movement, by a quick succession of ideas formed in the mind, and by passionate feelings that are felt and forgotten without attributing it to objects. Those who are in captive of dementia have lost their memory, even those attributed to their loved ones. Their only memory consists of those in the past. They forget instantaneously things in the present—seen heard or done. Many are irrational because the ideas do not flow coherently. The characteristic properties of dementia are that there is no judgment value and the ideas are spontaneous with no connection. The specific character of dementia contains a rapid progression or continual succession of isolated ideas, forgetfulness of previous condition, repetitive acts of exaggeration, decreased responsiveness to external influence, and complete lack of judgment.

The fifth and last mental derangement is called idiotism, or otherwise known as "obliteration of the intellectual faculties and affections". This disorder is derived from a variety of causes, such as extravagant and debilitating delight, alcohol abuse, deep sorrow, diligent study, aggressive blows to the head, tumors in the brain, and loss of consciousness due to blockage in vein or artery. Idiotism embodies a variety of forms. One such form is called Cretinism, which is a kind of idiotism that is relative to personal abnormalities. It is well known in the Valais and in parts of Switzerland. Most people who belong in this group are either deficient in speech or limited to the inarticulate utterances of sounds. Their expressions are emotionless, senses are dazed and motions are mechanical. Idiots also constitute the largest number of patients at hospitals. Individuals who have acute responsiveness can experience a violent shock to the extreme that all the activities of the brain can either be arrested in an action or eradicated completely. Unexpected happiness and exaggerated fear may likely occur as a result of a violent shock. As mentioned previously, idiotism is the most common among hospital patients and is incurable. At the Bicêtre asylum, these patients constitute one fourth of the entire population. Many die after a few days of arrival, having been reduced to states of stupor and weakness. However, some who recover with the progressive regeneration of their strength also regain their intellectual capabilities. Many of the young people that have remained in the state of idiotism for several months or years are attacked by a spasm of active mania between twenty and thirty days. The specific character of idiotism includes partial or complete extermination of the intellect and affections, apathy, disconnected, inarticulate sounds or impairment of speech, and nonsensical outbursts of passion.

In his book Traité médico-philosophique sur l'aliénation mentale; ou la manie, published in 1801, Pinel discusses his psychologically oriented approach. This book was translated into English by D. D. Davis as a Treatise on Insanity in 1806, although Davis substituted Pinel's introduction for his own, leaving out among other things Pinel's strong praise for Alexander Crichton. Pinel's book had an enormous influence on both French and Anglo-American psychiatrists during the nineteenth century. He meant by alienation that the patient feels like a stranger (alienus) to the world of the "sane". A sympathetic therapist living in that world might be able to journey into the patient's experience, understand the "alienated", their language, and possibly lead them back into society.

In 1802, Pinel published La Médecine Clinique which was based on his experiences at the Salpêtrière and in which he extended his previous book on classification and disease.

Pinel was elected to the Académie des Sciences in 1804 and was a member of the Académie de Médecine from its founding in 1820. He died in Paris on 25 October 1826.

== Clinical approach ==
=== Psychological understanding ===
The central and ubiquitous theme of Pinel's approach to etiology (causation) and treatment was "moral", meaning the emotional or the psychological not ethical. He observed and documented the subtleties and nuances of human experience and behavior, conceiving of people as social animals with imagination.

Pinel noted, for example, that: "being held in esteem, having honor, dignity, wealth, fame, which though they may be factitious, always distressing and rarely fully satisfied, often give way to the overturning of reason". He spoke of avarice, pride, friendship, bigotry, the desire for reputation, for conquest, and vanity. He noted that a state of love could turn to fury and desperation, and that sudden severe reversals in life, such as "from the pleasure of success to an overwhelming idea of failure, from a dignified state—or the belief that one occupies one—to a state of disgrace and being forgotten" can cause mania or "mental alienation". He identified other predisposing psychosocial factors such as an unhappy love affair, domestic grief, devotion to a cause carried to the point of fanaticism, religious fear, the events of the revolution, violent and unhappy passions, exalted ambitions of glory, financial reverses, religious ecstasy, and outbursts of patriotic fervor.

=== Treatments ===
Pinel developed specific practical techniques, rather than general concepts and assumptions. He engaged in therapeutic conversations to dissuade patients from delusions. He offered benevolent support and encouragement, although patients who persistently resisted or caused trouble might be threatened with incarceration or punishment if they were not able to control themselves.

Pinel argued that psychological intervention must be tailored to each individual rather than be based solely on the diagnostic category, and that it must be grounded in an understanding of the person's own perspective and history. He noted that "the treatment of insanity (l’aliénation mentale) without considering the differentiating characteristics of the patients [la distinction des espèces] has been at times superfluous, rarely useful, and often harmful", describing the partial or complete failures of some psychological approaches, as well as the harm that the usual cruel and harsh treatments caused to patients before they came to his hospital. He saw improvement as often resulting from natural forces within the patient, an improvement that treatment could at best facilitate and at worst interfere with.

Pinel’s approach to medical treatments has been described as ambiguous, complex, and ambivalent. He insisted that psychological techniques should always be tried first, for example "even where a violent and destructive maniac could be calmed by a single dose of an antispasmodic [he referred to opium], observation teaches that in a great number of cases, one can obtain a sure and permanent cure by the sole method of expectation, leaving the insane man to his tumultuous excitement... ...and [furthermore] seeing, again and again, the unexpected resources of nature left to itself or wisely guided, has rendered me more and more cautious with regard to the use of medications, which I no longer employ—except when the insufficiencies of psychological means have been proven."

For those cases regarded as psychologically incurable, Pinel would employ baths, showers, opium, camphor and other antispasmodics, as well as vesicants, cauterization, and bloodletting in certain limited cases only. He also recommended the use of laxatives for the prevention of nervous excitement and relapse.

Pinel often traced mental states to physiological states of the body, and in fact could be said to have practiced psychosomatic medicine. In general, Pinel traced organic causes to the gastrointestinal system and peripheral nervous system more often than to brain dysfunction. This was consistent with his rarely finding gross brain pathology in his post-mortem examinations of psychiatric patients, and his view that such findings that were reported could be correlational rather than causative.

=== Management ===
Pinel was concerned with a balance between control by authority and individual liberty. He believed in "the art of subjugating and taming the insane" and the effectiveness of "a type of apparatus of fear, of firm and consistent opposition to their dominating and stubbornly held ideas", but that it must be proportional and motivated only by a desire to keep order and to bring people back to themselves. The straitjacket and a period of seclusion were the only sanctioned punishments. Based on his observations, he believed that those who were considered most dangerous and carried away by their ideas had often been made so by the blows and bad treatment they had received, and that it could be ameliorated by providing space, kindness, consolation, hope, and humor.

Because of the dangers and frustrations that attendants experienced in their work, Pinel put great emphasis on the selection and supervision of attendants in order to establish a custodial setting dedicated to norms of constraint and liberty that would facilitate psychological work. He recommended that recovered patients be employed, arguing that "They are the ones who are most likely to refrain from all inhumane treatment, who will not strike even in retaliation, who can stand up to pleading, menaces, repetitive complaining, etc. and retain their inflexible firmness." Pinel also emphasized the necessity for leadership that was "thoughtful, philanthropic, courageous, physically imposing, and inventive in the development of maneuvers or tactics to distract, mollify, and impress" and "devoted to the concept of order without violence", so that patients are "led most often with kindness, but always with an inflexible firmness." He noted that his ex-patient and superintendent Pussin had showed him the way in this regard, and had also often been better placed to work with patients and develop techniques due to his greater experience and detailed knowledge of the patients as individuals.

=== Moral judgments ===
Pinel generally expressed warm feelings and respect for his patients, as exemplified by: "I cannot but give enthusiastic witness to their moral qualities. Never, except in romances, have I seen spouses more worthy to be cherished, more tender fathers, passionate lovers, purer or more magnanimous patriots, than I have seen in hospitals for the insane, in their intervals of reasonableness and calm; a man of sensibility may go there any day and take pleasure in scenes of compassion and tenderness". He argued that otherwise positive character traits could cause a person to be vulnerable to the distressing vicissitudes of life, for example "those persons endowed with a warmth of imagination and a depth of sensitivity, who are capable of experiencing powerful and intense emotions, [since it is they] who are most predisposed to mania".

Pinel distanced himself from religious views, and in fact considered that excessive religiosity could be harmful.

However, he sometimes took a moral stance himself as to what he considered to be mentally healthy and socially appropriate. Moreover, he sometimes showed a condemnatory tone toward what he considered personal failings or vice, for example noting in 1809: "On one side one sees families which thrive over a course of many years, in the bosom of order and concord, on the other one sees many others, especially in the lower social classes, who offend the eye with the repulsive picture of debauchery, arguments, and shameful distress!". He goes on to describe this as the most prolific source of alienation needing treatment, adding that while some such examples were a credit to the human race many others are "a disgrace to humanity!"

== Influence ==
Pinel is generally seen as the physician who more than any other transformed the concept of 'the mad' into that of patients needing care and understanding, establishing a field that would eventually be called psychiatry. His legacy included improvement of asylum conditions; broadly psychosocial (incl. milieu) therapeutic approaches; history-taking; nosography (the science of the description of syndromes); broadly-numerical assessments of courses of illness and treatment responses; and a record of clinical teaching.

Pinel's actions took place in the context of the Enlightenment, and a number of others were also reforming asylums along humanitarian lines. For example, Vincenzo Chiarugi, in the 1780s in Italy, removed metal chains from patients but did not enjoy the same renown bestowed on the more explicitly humanitarian Pinel who was so visible from late 18th century revolutionary France. In France, Joseph D'Aquin in Chambéry permitted patients to move about freely and published a book in 1791 urging humanitarian reforms, dedicating the second edition in 1804 to Pinel. The movement as a whole become known as moral treatment or moral management, and influenced asylum development and psychological approaches throughout the Western world.

Pinel's most important contribution may have been the observation and conviction that there could be sanity and rationality even in cases that seemed on the surface impossible to understand, and that this could appear for periods in response to surrounding events (and not just because of such things as the phase of the moon, a still common assumption and the origin of the term lunatic). The influential philosopher Hegel praised Pinel for this approach.

The right psychical treatment therefore keeps in view the truth that insanity is not an abstract loss of reason (neither in the point of intelligence nor of will and its responsibility), but only derangement, only a contradiction in a still subsisting reason; – just as physical disease is not an abstract, i.e. mere and total, loss of health (if it were that, it would be death), but a contradiction in it. This humane treatment, no less benevolent than reasonable (the services of Pinel towards which deserve the highest acknowledgement), presupposes the patient's rationality, and in that assumption has the sound basis for dealing with him on this side – just as in the case of bodily disease the physician bases his treatment on the vitality which as such still contains health.

Pinel also started a trend for diagnosing forms of insanity that seemed to occur "without delerium" (confusion, delusions or hallucinations). Pinel called this Manie sans délire, folie raisonnante or folie lucide raisonnante. He described cases who seemed to be overwhelmed by instinctive furious passions but still seemed sane. This was influential in leading to the concept of moral insanity, which became an accepted diagnosis through the second half of the 19th century. Pinel's main psychiatric heir, Esquirol, built on Pinel's work and popularised various concepts of monomania.

However, Pinel was also criticised and rejected in some quarters. A new generation favoured pathological anatomy, seeking to locate mental disorders in brain lesions. Pinel undertook comparisons of skull sizes, and considered possible physiological substrates, but he was criticized for his emphasis on psychology and the social environment. Opponents were bolstered by the discovery of brain anomalies as the cause of some mental disorder. Pinel's humanitarian achievements were emphasized and mythologised instead.

With increasing industrialization, asylums generally became overcrowded, misused, isolated and run-down. The moral treatment principles were often neglected along with the patients. There was recurrent debate over the use of psychological-social oppression even if some physical forces were removed. By the mid-19th century in England, the Alleged Lunatics' Friend Society was proclaiming the moral treatment approach was achieved "by mildness and coaxing, and by solitary confinement", treating people like children without rights to make their own decisions.

Similarly in the mid-20th century, Foucault's influential book, Madness and Civilization: A History of Insanity in the Age of Reason, also known as History of Madness, focused on Pinel, along with Tuke, as the driving force behind a shift from physical to mental oppression. Foucault argued that the approach simply meant that patients were ignored and verbally isolated, and were worse off than before. They were made to see madness in others and then in themselves until they felt guilt and remorse. The doctor, despite his lack of medical knowledge about the underlying processes, had all powers of authority, and defined insanity. Foucault also suggested that a focus on the rights of patients at Bicêtre was partly due to revolutionary concerns that it housed and chained victims of arbitrary or political power, or alternatively that it might be enabling refuge for anti-revolutionary suspects, as well as just 'the mad'.

Scull argues that the "...manipulations and ambiguous 'kindness' of Tuke and Pinel..." may nevertheless have been preferable to the harsh coercion and physical "treatments" of previous generations, though he does recognise its "...less benevolent aspects and its latent potential ... for deterioration into a repressive form...." Some have criticised the process of deinstitutionalization that took place in the 20th century and called for a return to Pinel's approach, so as not to underestimate the needs that mentally ill people might have for protection and care.

== Sources ==
- Bender, George A.; Thom, Robert Alan (1966) [1961]. Great Moments in Medicine: A History of Medicine in Pictures. Detroi, MI: Parke, Davis & Company. Northwood Institute Press. Review on PubMed
- Goldstein, Jan. Console and Classify, (Cambridge U. P. 1987).
- Pinel, Philippe (1980). Weiner, Dora B. (ed.). The Clinical Training of Doctors: An Essay of 1793. Baltimore: The Johns Hopkins University Press. ISBN 9780801824487.
- Weiner, Dora. Comprendre et Soigner, (Fayard, Paris, 1999).
