= William Pargeter =

British doctor (1760–1810)

William Pargeter (1760–1810) was an eighteenth-century physician in England with an interest in mental illness.

Like his contemporaries, Thomas Arnold (1742–1816), Thomas Sutton (1767–1835), and John Haslam (1764–1844), he wrote a book on the subject titled Observations on Maniacal Disorders (1792).

Pargeter was born in Hertfordshire, the son and grandson of clergymen. He entered Oxford University in 1777, and received his Bachelor of Arts (B.A.) from New College in 1781. He was encouraged to study medicine by Martin Wall, the Lichfield Professor of Clinical Medicine at Oxford University. Pargeter entered St Bartholomew's Hospital in 1783. In 1786, he received his Medicinae Doctor (M.D.) from Marischal College in Aberdeen. Pargeter remained in London for another year and then moved to Reading where he practiced medicine until 1795. In that year he also took Holy Orders and entered the British Navy as a chaplain, serving in Malta. He retired from the Navy on a pension in 1802 and retired to Oxfordshire. He died in 1810.

Pargeter stated in the preface of his book that he followed the ideas of Dr William Cullen (1710–1790), a professor at the Edinburgh Medical School in Scotland. He quoted Cullen's nosology of mania and the relationship between mania and melancholia, and described the symptoms of each with Cullen's terms of "excitement" and "collapse" of the brain.

Pargeter wrote that the cause of madness is a mystery and "wonderful are the works of the Lord and His ways past finding out." He advanced his own ideas (based on cases he and others had studied) observing how various "passions" may be responsible, such as grief, despair, intense study, and application of the mind; as well as poisons such as opium and mercury. He inveighed against private madhouses run by non-physicians and non-clergymen for profit. Pargeter believed that patients were abused in these houses. He also commented on the popular idea that lunacy was influenced by phases of the moon. He often quoted poetry by Milton, Cowper, and others to describe melancholia in his patients.

Pargeter was convinced that the treatment of insanity must be based on management rather than on medicine. He quoted the importance of "catching the eye" of the insane person as means of obtaining the patient's attention so that the physician could control the patient's behavior. He described this method in four case reports. He also discussed the usual medical treatments of the time including bleeding, cupping, purging, hot and cold applications, as well as the use of medicines as camphor and hyoscyamine.

== Works ==
- Pargeter, William. Observations on Maniacal Disorders. Reading: Printed for the author, and sold by Smart and Cowslade; J. Murray, London; and J. Fletcher, Oxford, [1792].

== Bibliography ==
- Andrews, Jonathan, et al. The History of Bethlem. London; New York: Routledge, 1997.
- Hunter, Richard A., and Ida Macalpine. Three Hundred Years of Psychiatry, 1535-1860: A History Presented in Selected English Texts. London: Oxford Univ. Press, 1963.
- Parry-Jones, William LI. The Trade in Lunacy: A Study of Private Madhouses in England in the Eighteenth and Nineteenth Centuries. London: Routledge & Kegan Paul, 1972.
- Porter, Roy. Madness: A Brief History. Oxford; New York: Oxford Univ. Press, 2002.
- Scull, Andrew T. The Most Solitary of Afflictions: Madness and Society in Britain, 1700-1900. New Haven: Yale Univ. Press, 1993.
