= Gazette de santé =

French medical journal

The Gazette de santé was a French medical journal that ran from July 1773 to December 1789.

The journal was typically in four pages, though sometimes in six. It was published in 52 issues each year. It was absorbed by the Journal de Médecine, Chirurgie et Pharmacie.

Among the journals editors and contributors were Jean-Jacques Gardane, Jean-Jacques Paulet and Philippe Pinel.
