= Antonio Savaresi =

Neapolitan military physician

Antonio Mario Timoleone Savaresi (1773–1830) was a Neapolitan military medical doctor. He served in the French armies in Italy, Egypt and on Martinique and later became the physician-in-chief of the armies of the Kingdom of Naples as well as a renowned scientist.

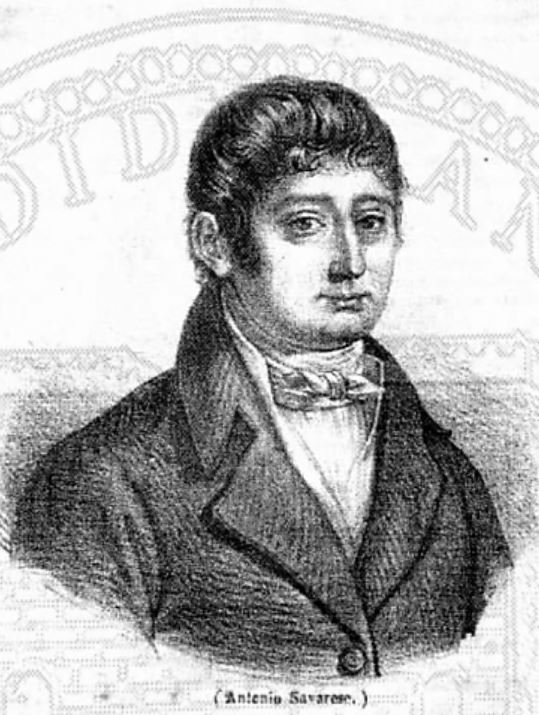
Antonio Savaresi

== Life ==
=== From Naples to exile ===
Antonio Mario Timoleone Savaresi was born in Naples on 10 September 1773. He was the younger brother of the physician and mineralogist Andrea Savaresi. In the early 1790s he began to study medicine in his home town. Among his academic teachers were Domenico Cirillo, Domenico Cotugno, Vincenzo Petagna, Nicola Andria and Antonio Sementini. When the ideals of the French Revolution sparked to the Italian peninsula, Savaresi – as other scientists such as Carlo Lauberg and Annibale Giordano – adhered to a clandestine network aiming at overthrowing the monarchy. As the republican conspiracy was discovered, in 1794 Savaresi flew to Oneglia. This small town on the Ligurian coast had been occupied by the French armies and, being administered by the radical revolutionary Filippo Buonarroti, became a safe haven for Italian republicans.

==== In Italy, Egypt and the Caribbean ====
Due to the lack of medical officers, Savaresi was immediately drafted to the French army, beginning his career as an army physician. From 1796 to 1798 he took part in the first Italian campaign of the French revolutionary wars. From Rome he was dispatched to the armée d’Orient and participated in the conquest of Malta and the French campaign in Egypt (1798-1801), which was initially led by Napoleon Bonaparte. He served at Damietta, Cairo, Salhiya and Alexandria and during the battles of the Pyramids and of Abukir. After his return to France in, 1802 he was sent to Martinique, where he served in both Saint-Pierre and Fort-de-France and where he was promoted to the grade of physician-in-chief. During his return-journey to Europe he was captured by British privateers and had to find his way back to France via the United States, England and the Netherlands.

==== Back in Naples ====
In 1805 he was dispatched to the French troops in Italy and took part in the conquest of the Kingdom of Naples. Back in his home town, he became the physician-in-chief of the kingdom’s armies. He played a central role in the reform of the military hospitals and health services and became a renowned scholar. During the Restauration, when the Bourbon dynasty came back to power, he tried to hide his revolutionary youth, pretending that in the 1790s he had left Naples in order to study medicine in Montpellier. He died in Naples in 1830.

== Scholarship ==
Savaresi published several articles and treatises on medical, anthropological and other scientific issues. In his writings he framed his empirical observations by referring to scientific models taken from contemporary medical doctrines. Thereby he combined neo-Hippocratic assumptions about the pathogenic role of environmental factors (miasma theory) with the more recent theories developed by the Scottish physician John Brown (1735-1788), according to which health was basically the result of an internal balance of human “excitability” and disease a matter of over or under-stimulation. While the Brunonian system of medicine did not enjoy much support among French physicians, it was very popular among many young republican physicians from the Italian peninsula who considered it to be a revolutionary doctrine. Although Brown’s system was opposed to Hippocratic medicine and miasma theory, Savaresi combined them in order to make sense of the diseases he was trying to understand and to cure.

Following the instructions of the physician-in-chief of the French army in Egypt, René-Nicolas Dufriche Desgenettes, Savaresi i.a. adopted medical topographies as an epistemic genre, writing detailed reports about the (supposed) links between environmental and pathological features of certain regions and developed ideas about hygienic measures to prevent the outbreak of diseases. Unlike other contemporary physicians, who were radical anti-contagionists, Savaresi stated that – in some circumstances – diseases (such as the plague) could actually be transmitted between human beings. He was a strong supporter of scientific racism and convinced of the superiority of Western science above “indigenous” medical traditions. Nevertheless, Savaresi selectively appropriated therapeutic knowledge from Egyptian and Creole Caribbean medical actors in order to (try to) fight the plague, ophtalmia and yellow fever. His work was widely read, and referenced by French and British physicians. On a whole, his approaches were characterised by pronounced eclecticism.

== Publications ==
- « Essai sur la topographie physique et médicale de Damiette », La Décade égyptienne, 2, an VIII (1799/1800), 85-90.
- « Observations sur les maladies qui ont régné à Damiette dans le premier semestre de l’an 7 », La Décade égyptienne, 2, an VIII (1799/1800), 122-127.
- « Description et traitement de l’ophtalmie d’Egypte », La Décade égyptienne, 2, an VIII (1799/1800), 159-165.
- « Notice sur la topographie physique et médicale de Ssalehhyéeh », », La Décade égyptienne, 3, an VIII (1799/1800), 96-100.
- Descrizione dell’oftalmia di Egitto, col metodo curativo della medesima, Cairo, Imprimerie nationale, an VIII (1799/1800).
- Mémoires et opuscules physiques et médicaux sur l’Égypte, Paris, P. Didot, an X – 1802.
- Histoire médicale de l’armée de Naples, Paris, Migneret, 1807.
- « Saggio sull’istoria naturale della Martinicca », Giornale enciclopedico di Napoli, 2/4, 1807, 11-28, and 2/7, 1807, 49-71.
- Memorie ed opuscoli fisici e medici sull’Egitto, Naples, Domenico Sangiacomo, 1808.
- De la fièvre jaune en général; et particulièrement de celle qui a régné à la Martinique en l’an XI et XII (1803 et 1804), avec des Observations sur les autres Maladies de cette Ile ou des Antilles, et un Essai sur son Histoire naturelle, Naples, Imprimerie française, 1809.
- « Préparation de l’opium à la manière des Égyptiens », Bulletin de pharmacie, 1, 1809, 263, (with Joseph-Victor Saxe).
- « Osservazioni mediche e notizie storiche intorno alle digitali lutea e purpurea », Atti del Real Istituto d’Incoraggiamento alle Scienze Naturali di Napoli, 2, 1818, 183-199.
- « Memoria sul carattere fisico e naturale de’ creoli di America, sia della specie bianca, sia della nera », Atti della Reale Accademia delle scienze, sezione della Società Reale borbonica, 1, 1819, 243-270.
- « Memoria sulla composizione e sugli effetti di uno sciroppo antisifilitico molto usitato », Giornale enciclopedico di Napoli, 2nd series, 15/2, 1821, 138-172 and 15/3, 1821, 3-26.
