= Julius Ludwig August Koch =

German psychiatrist

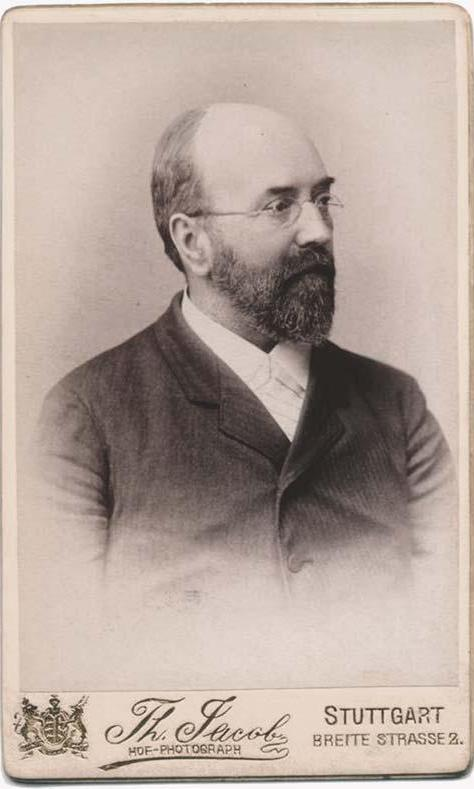
Julius Koch

Julius Ludwig August Koch (/kɒx/ KOKH, German: [ˈjuːli̯ʊs ˈluːtvɪç ˈʔaʊɡʊst ˈkɔx]; 4 December 1841 in Laichingen, Württemberg – 25 June 1908 in Zwiefalten, Württemberg) was a German psychiatrist whose work influenced later concepts of personality disorders.

Koch was born in the town of Laichingen in the state of Württemberg. His father was a general practitioner physician who headed his own private insane asylum.

Koch worked as a chemist for several years and then studied medicine in Tübingen from 1863 to 1867. He subsequently worked as a physician, later joining a psychiatric hospital. In 1874 he became director of the state mental hospital in Zwiefalten (Württemberg).

Described as deeply rooted in a Christian faith, Koch's first works were philosophically-minded. In 1882 he published "Epistomological Investigations" (Erkenntnistheoretische Untersuchungen), and in 1885 "Outline of Philosophy" (Grundriss der Philosophie). In 1886 his "Reality and its Knowledge" (Die Wirklichkeit und ihre Erkenntnis) was an attempt to join the philosophy of Immanuel Kant with Christian theories.

Koch argued that the body and soul are part of the natural material world, while the mind (geist) is the way through which freedom, but also a moral claim by God, are exercised. He felt that philosophical trends against the Christianity of a nation would lead to afflictions and dangers. Overall his philosophy has been described as homespun and quite dogmatic, especially with regard to the religious elements.

== Psychiatry ==
From 1887, Koch focused more on clinical psychiatric issues. In 1888, he published a Short Textbook of Psychiatry (Kurzgefaßter Leitfaden der Psychiatrie). There he introduced his concept of "psychopathic inferiority" (Psychopathische Minderwertigkeiten).

Between 1891 and 1893, Koch published in three parts Die psychopathischen Minderwertigkeiten (Psychopathic Inferiorities). This work provided more detail on what he intended to be a morally non-judgemental concept of individuals with various mental dysfunctions. Such conditions might have been otherwise labeled at the time as forms of moral insanity.

Psychopathic inferiority was differentiated from other forms of psychopathology such as insanity with delusions or hallucinations, or gross intellectual deficit ('idiocy'). He divided the psychopathies into congenital and acquired forms, and each of those categories into forms of increasing severity. Psychopathic "disposition" meant a recognizable mental infirmity. Psychopathic "defect" or "taint" (Belastung), meant "anomalies in excitability, a lack of harmony, an eccentric, contradictory self, peculiarities, primordial instinctive impulses and outbursts and something periodic in their behavior". Psychopathic "degeneration" meant "a habitual mental weakness either mainly in the intellectual or mainly in the moral realm or in both". The use of the term 'degeneration' was in the context of the pseudo-genetic religiously-inspired degeneration theory that was prevalent at the time.

However, Koch argued that individuals with these conditions should not be punished as severely and that there should be special institutions for them. This was on the basis that, although they were not certifiably 'insane', they had diminished responsibility. Koch's comments on free will and determinism, in both his philosophical and psychiatric work, are said to be so similar to the current debate on free will and neuroscience that some passages do not even appear historical.

Koch wrote an essay in 1894 entitled Die Frage nach dem geborenen Verbrecher (The question of the born criminal). He generally divided habitual criminals into the mentally healthy and the mentally abnormal, the latter being the 'psychopathic' criminal types. He suggested there could be acquired and congenital types. He speculated that there could be a weakness to be provoked into crime in certain environments, or a compelling drive towards crime. A criminal inclination, Koch thought, would always be accompanied by other mental symptoms. However, he thought it could occur in otherwise highly respectable people, as occasional aberrations, as a 'specific stimulus to crime.' Nevertheless, laymen in Germany soon used the term, or its shortened version 'inferiors', to refer to any individual who supposedly suffered from a constitutional inclination toward crime.

Koch retired in 1898.

== Legacy ==
In Germany, Koch's term was generally shortened to 'minderwertigkeit' (inferiors), used interchangeably with 'degenerate', and applied mainly to criminal types. After World War I psychiatrists dropped that term and used psychopathisch instead, and its derivatives Psychopathie and Psychopathen. This was actually an attempt to avoid assumptions of biological, moral or social inferiority, and instead be neutral and 'scientific'. Koch's theories had been only loosely linked to degeneration theory and so survived the declining popularity of that theory after the war. The concept of psychopathy initially referred to not just antisocial behaviors but to a wide range of issues which later were classified in the category of 'personality disorders'.

The term 'constitutional psychopathic inferiority' eventually caught on in the US by the 1920s. The idea of 'constitutional' meant within the make-up of the person, within their physical or psychological nature. It was used by psychiatrists to classify, for example, 'the unfit or partially fit who furnish the recruiting material for so many of the neuroses and psychoses'. This included individuals who suffered shell shock during war, as well as those who simply did not seem able to function in modern society, or who committed crimes. Some psychiatrists preferred the term 'psychopathic personality'. Around the same time, Austrian Alfred Adler was developing his idea of the inferiority complex, which became widely known.

Some of the psychopathic inferiorities were later recast as abnormal personalities by Kurt Schneider, and a number of the conditions have ended up known today as personality disorders. The term psychopathy itself gained a specific and notorious meaning of a condition of amorality and anti-social or violent behaviour. Such a morally pejorative concept is said to have not been intended by Koch; he had applied the term 'psychopathic' to mean originating from an organic defect in the brain, and the term inferiority to simply refer to dysfunction. However, it was probably his concept and terminology that provided the unfortunate conglomeration of aspects of inferiority, amorality and socially harmful behavior.
