= René-Nicolas Dufriche Desgenettes =

French military doctor (1762–1837)

René-Nicolas Dufriche-Desgenettes
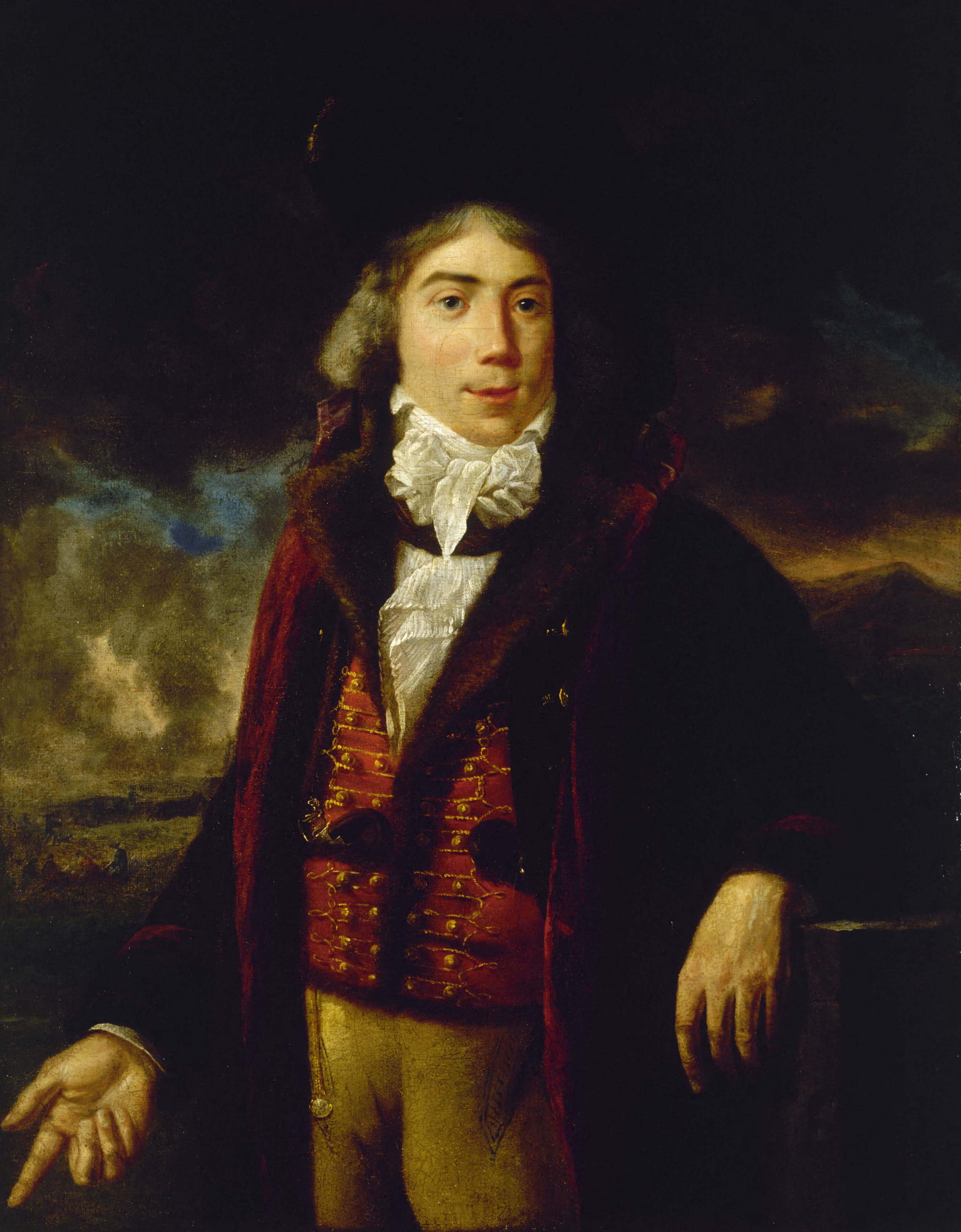
- 1798 portrait
- Born: 23 May 1762; Alençon, France
- Died: 1837 (aged 74–75); Paris, France
- Occupation: Military doctor

René-Nicolas Dufriche, baron Desgenettes (23 May 1762, Alençon – 3 February 1837, Paris) was a French military doctor. He was chief doctor to the French army during French invasion of Egypt and Syria and the Battle of Waterloo.

== Life ==
=== Early life ===
Son of a lawyer at the Parliament of Rouen, he first studied at the Jesuit college at Alençon. He studied classics at Collège Sainte-Barbe and the Collège du Plessis in Paris, but left off these studies to follow the course taught at the collège de France, from then on studying medicine with devotion. Trained in the hospital services of Pelletan and Vicq d’Azyr, he also studied under John Hunter in London and Desbois de Rochefort and Boyer in France. In trying to perfect his skills he made several journeys to England and Italy (spending 4 years at Florence and Siena then Rome and Naples), where his good manners brought him the acquaintance of many of the most distinguished scholars of the day.

Returning to France in the course of 1789, he was made a doctor at Montpellier, in the wake of his remarkable thesis entitled : Essai physiologique sur les vaisseaux lymphatiques (Physiological essay on the lymphatic vessels).

=== Revolution and Italy ===
In 1791, he went to Paris, where political unrest was at its height. He joined the Girondins and then, on their elimination by the Montagnards during the Reign of Terror, he took refuge in Rouen. The events of 1792 and early 1793 had caused the whole of Europe to take up arms against France and so, on the advice of his former teacher Vicq-d’Azyr and driven by a desire to serve the Republican fatherland, he got himself sent as a surgeon to the army gathering on the borders of Italy in February 1793. He soon became one of the top army surgeons through his energy and courage, and in March 1793 was attached to the field hospital of the armée de la Méditerranée due to his knowing Italian.

In effect, during this first campaign, always at the advanced outposts, he was involved in the reorganisation of French military hospitals. In the Armée d'Italie from 1793 to 1795, he got to know Napoleon Bonaparte and dazzled him with his intelligence and his range of cultural awareness. A few years later, Bonaparte remembered him and made him chief doctor to the Egyptian expedition. Attached to the division commanded by general Masséna, he successfully faced a typhus epidemic.

=== After Italy ===
On 24 nivôse year II, he took up leadership of the hospital at Antibes, all of whose patients were cured, and returned to the army on 30 fructidor to be head of the hospital service of the right division, then moved to Loano and the representatives there, on 2 nivôse year III, to organise the medical service for the maritime expedition assigned to reconquer Corsica (taken by the English). After this expedition, he rejoined the active army at Albenga, where he learned that on Barras's request and Bonaparte's recommendation he had on 7 brumaire year IV been made "médecin ordinaire" of the hospital of Val-de-Grâce and of the 17e division militaire (Paris). A year later he became professor of physiology and medical physics.

The following year Bonaparte, who had appreciated Desgenettes' merit, reiterated it to the Directory and tried to get them to get him attached to his army. However, in a fit of jealousy, the directeurs kept Desgenettes in Paris, under the pretext that he could be more use to the Republic in a medical school rather than serving with the field hospitals. It was thus during this period of rest that Desgenettes edited his mémoire on the usefulness of artificial anatomical models. In this, after tracing their history and giving details of the magnificent collection of them at Florence, he called on the French government to found a similar institution in Paris. Shortly after the Revolution, he frequented the salon of Anne-Catherine Helvétius. Nevertheless, for Charles Mullié, it was painful to say that, in his roles as professor, Desgenettes the scholar's only reward for his sacrificing his fortune and his own health by indifference and ingratitude – four times in floréal year V he rendered his resignation, and four times the ministry refused to accept it.

=== Egypt ===
On returning to Paris after the Treaty of Campo Formio, Bonaparte obtained his protégé Desgenettes an attachment to the armée d'Angleterre on 23 nivôse year VI; it is now known that the organisation of this army on the Channel coast was only a cover for preparations for the French invasion of Egypt. Also, on 1 pluviôse, Desgenettes received the order to report to Toulon, to be attached to general Bonaparte's army as doctor in chief. In 1798, he was made chief physician of the Armée d'Orient as well as part of the natural history and physics section of the Institut d'Égypte, and Bonaparte invited him on board the admiral's flagship Orient.

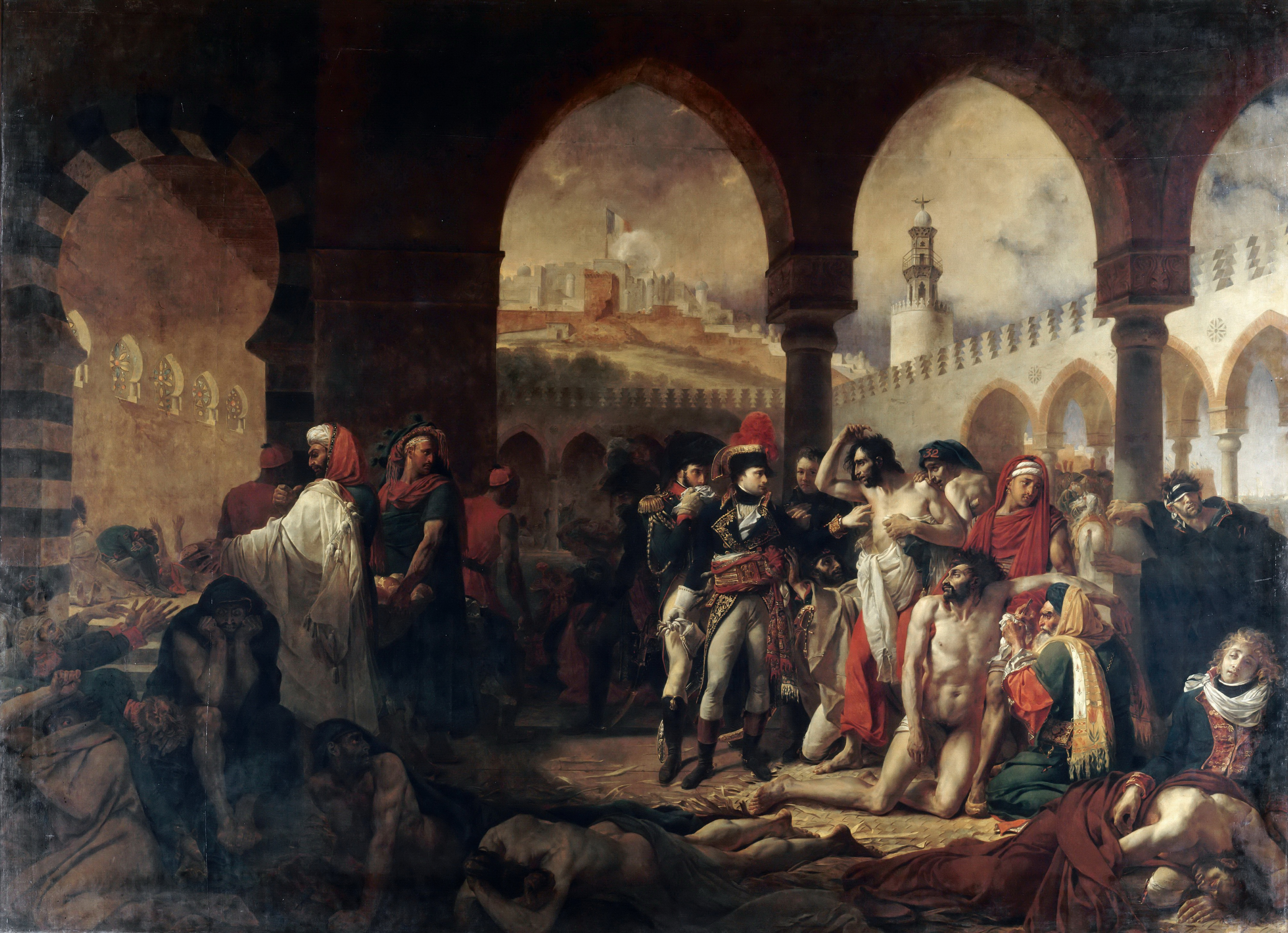
Bonaparte Visiting the Plague Victims of Jaffa (detail), Antoine-Jean Gros. Desgenettes in the background

As physician in chief, Desgenettes instructed the health officers of the Armée d'Orient (i.a. Antonio Savaresi) to study the ecology, the diseases and the remedies used by local healers. Desgenettes had hardly arrived in Egypt when he was assailed by the several diseases brought on the army by the burning heat, continual bivouacking and lack of drinkable water. He installed hygiene measures and rigorous preventative measures – washing (both bodies and clothes), disinfection of areas, supervision of nutrition. The many cases of smallpox, scurvy, "fièvre de Damiette", severe and contagious conjunctivitis and dysentery observed by him here gave him further experience of military medicine. During the expedition into Syria, as head doctor of the armée d’Orient, Desgenettes had to face a bubonic plague epidemic in the course of the army's march across Syria's desert. To sustain the troops' morale, he denied the disease's existence and forbade any mention of its name.

When Bonaparte found himself forced to raise the siege of the fortress at Saint-Jean-d'Acre on 21 May 1799, he demanded that the medical staff evacuate the wounded and ill and kill the plague cases with fatally strong doses of opium, but Desgenettes determinedly refused to do so, forcing Bonaparte to instead transport them as far as Jaffa. The two men's friendship then cooled again over the question of evacuating the plague cases from Jaffa.

=== Return to France ===
On returning to France, around the end of Fructidor year IX, Desgenettes was designated as head doctor of the military training-hospital of Strasbourg. However, due to his new role as professor adjoined to the École de Médecine de Paris and his need for stability after a punishing campaign, he begged the favour of instead continuing as doctor to the hospital at Val-de-Grâce. Napoleon approved this request, on 8 Nivôse year X. Made a member of the Institut and an associate member of the Sociétés de médecine of Marseille and of Montpellier that same year, around the start of year XI he published his Histoire médicale de l’armée d’Orient, creating a great sensation in the scholarly world.

Made a member of the Légion d’honneur on 25 prairial (14 June) year XII, on the day after the proclamation of the First French Empire he was made inspector-general of the Army Health Service (Service de Santé des Armées). In year XIII, he then became a member of the commission sent to Tuscany by Napoleon to study the character of the epidemic raging there, and in year XIV he then went to Spain with other French doctors to carry out research on yellow fever. He re-assumed his duties at Val-de-Grâce in January 1806.

=== War ===
Since hostilities had recommenced, the exertions of three consecutive campaigns had introduced several diseases into the French army. On 6 April 1807, Desgenettes received the emperor's order to rejoin the grand quartier général; his only son was dying, but he stopped caring for him and left with 24 hours. In 1807, he was made chief doctor of the Grande Armée and in this role assisted at the battles of Eylau, Friedland and Wagram. After the peace of Tilsitt, he asked to return to private life and devote himself wholly to his family, but Napoleon refused. He was allowed a vacation, leaving Berlin for Paris in May 1808, and returning to Napoleon in October, by which time he was in Spain, where he judged Desgenettes' presence to be necessary.

Loaded with favours from Napoleon but despairing at the curbs set by his army work on his liberty and independence, he was made a knight of the empire in 1809, then a baron in 1810. Taking part in the Russian campaign, he organised the care of the officers. Taken prisoner at Vilnius on 10 December 1812 during the retreat from Russia, he was the only one captured that day mentioned by name as worth being freed. Tsar Alexander I of Russia freed him when he heard of the care he had taken of Russian soldiers and had him escorted by his Cossack guard to the French forward-lines at Magdeburg on 20 March 1813. Desgenettes set out from there for Paris, charged with a secret mission from the viceroy to Napoleon, which he acquitted. In the course of April he then left Paris again to reassume his duties as head-doctor of the Grande Armée.

He was trapped in the citadel of Torgau after the defeat at Leipzig during the campaign in Germany. A typhus epidemic was raging in the citadel at the time, and he was still holed up there when an imperial decree of 5 October 1813 made him chief-doctor of the Imperial Guard, which circumstances thus preventing him from taking up immediately. On the site's capitulation on 2 January 1814, he wished to return to France but was instead, in disregard for the treaties, held back in Dresden as a prisoner. It was only at the end of May that he could return to Paris, where he found that minister Dupont de l’Étang had withdrawn his title as chief-doctor to the Guard. Alongside these persecutions on the part of the military administration, he was also ejected from his chair of hygiene at the Faculté de médecine de Paris, given him by the consulate in reward for his services at Saint-Jean-d'Acre. To make up for these injustices, he was made a knight of the Legion of Honour. On acceding to the ministry, Nicolas Jean-de-Dieu Soult returned to Desgenettes his roles as chief-doctor and professor at the hospital of Val-de-Grâce and Napoléon, on his return, reinstated him as chief inspector of the health service and as chief doctor of the Guard, adding on 20 May an appointment as chief doctor of the armée du Nord.

=== Hundred Days and after ===
During the Hundred Days, Desgenettes re-assumed his role as chief-doctor of the Imperial Guard and assisted at the Battle of Waterloo.

He came back to Paris with the army, and Louis XVIII confirmed him in his role at Val-de-Grâce on 1 July and at the Faculté de Médecine in Paris, where he was charged with teaching hygiene and readmitted into the Conseil général de Santé des armées in 1819 (formerly the Inspection générale). He only gave up his roles as inspector-general in January 1816, when the title was suppressed.

In 1820, he was received as a member of the Académie Royale de Médecine, though he was expelled in 1822 following student demonstrations, only to be re-admitted in 1830 and elected a member of the Académie des sciences under the July Monarchy.

After the July Revolution, on 14 November, Baron Desgenettes was made mayor of the 10th arrondissement of Paris, a role he filled until the municipal elections of 1834.

On 2 March 1832, he was made chief doctor of Les Invalides. His name features on the Arc de Triomphe. He was also a member of the Académie de Caen.

Alexandre Dumas described Desgenettes as "old, bawdy, very witty and very cynical".

== Selected works ==
- (1802), Histoire médicale de l’armée d’Orient,
  - (1835), 3rd ed.: Histoire médicale de l’armée d’Orient,
- Essais de Biographie médicale, 1835.
