= Bruno Amantea =

Italian physician and surgeon

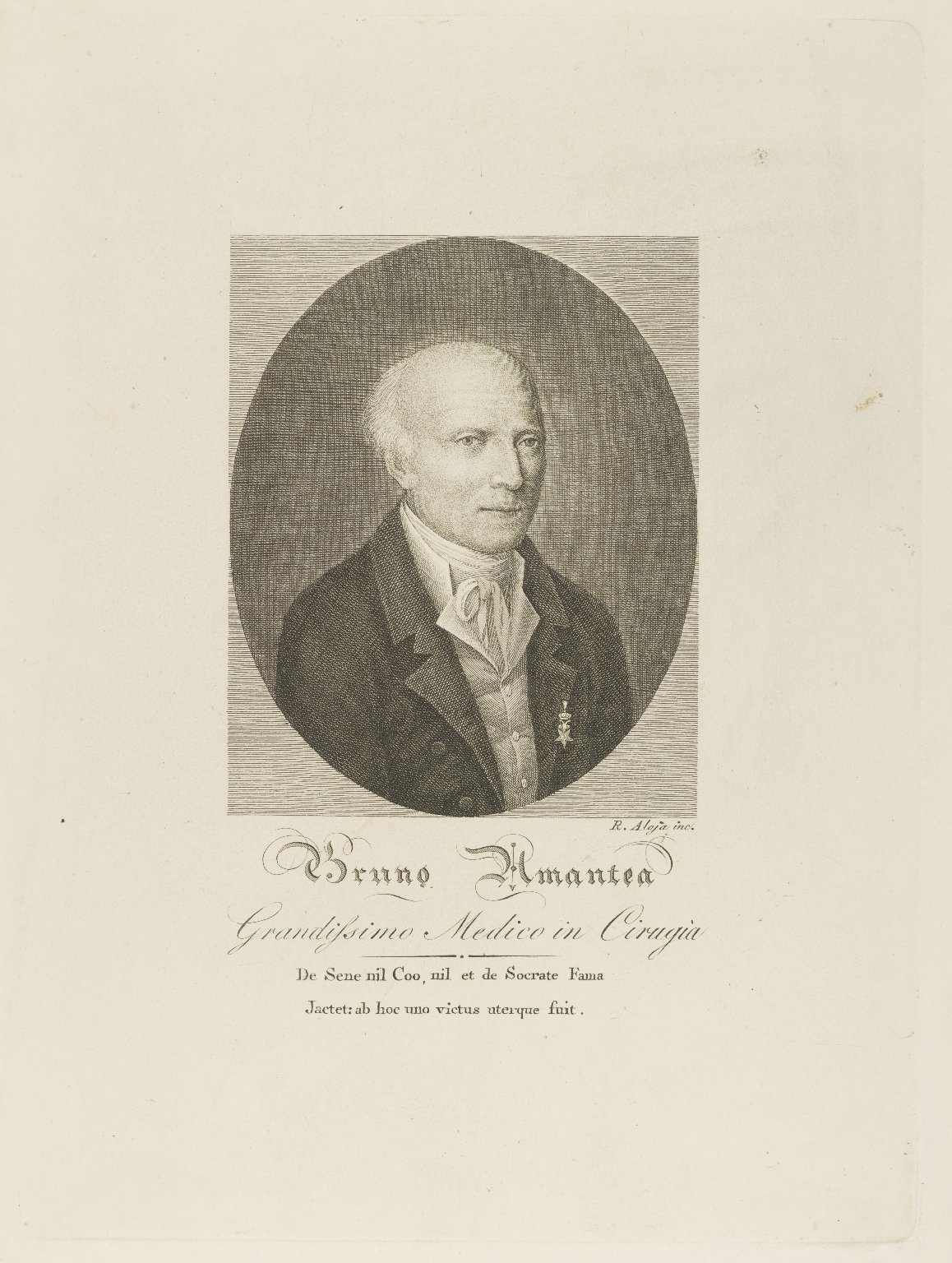
Bruno Amantea (1750-1819)

Bruno Amantea (circa 1750 – 10 April 1819) was an Italian physician and surgeon active in Naples.

== Biography ==
He was born in Grimaldi near Cosenza. His father was also a surgeon. After initial studies in his native town, he studied under the Jesuits in Cosenza, then moved to Naples at the age of 18, to study at the college attached to the Ospedale degli Incurabili, where he trained under Domenico Cotugno, Sabato Mauro, and Nicola Franchini. after five years, he had an appointment as surgeon at this hospital. There, he joined the teams of Pollio, Mirra and Perrano. He published a treatise on L'estrazione della pietra della vescica orinaria (On "The removal of stones from the urinary bladder"). He benefited from an apparatus invented in 1722 by Mariano Santo. He also performed hernia, cataract, and popliteal aneurysm surgeries. In 1792, he was named professor of anatomy. In 1798, he was nominated chief surgeon to the Neapolitan army in Sangermano. He was enrolled in various national academies. In 1815, the restored King Ferdinand I named him surgeon of the royal suite.
