= Domenico Cotugno =

Italian physician

- Domenico Cotugno
- Born: January 29, 1736; Ruvo di Puglia
- Died: October 6, 1822 (aged 86)
- Scientific career
- Fields: physician

Domenico Felice Antonio Cotugno (January 29, 1736 – October 6, 1822) was an Italian medical doctor.

== Biography ==
Born at Ruvo di Puglia (Province of Bari, Apulia) into a family of humble means, Cotugno underwent physical and economic hardships to get an education. He was sent to nearby Molfetta for training in Latin, returning to Ruvo for work in logic, metaphysics, mathematics, physics, and the natural sciences. He soon found his natural bent in medicine and continued his studies from 1753 at the University of Naples, and in 1756 graduated from Salerno medical school. He received his doctorate in philosophy and physics in 1755, and became an assistant at the Ospedale degli Incurabili (Neapolitan Hospital for Incurables). In 1761 he became professor of surgery at that hospital, and was subsequently for 30 years professor of anatomy at the high school of Naples. In 1808 he was appointed royal physician to the King of Naples. He ceased lecturing in 1814, and suffered a cerebral embolism in 1818 that recurred in 1822, resulting in his death.

In 1765 he made trips to Rome and northern Italy to visit libraries and men of science, including Giovanni Battista Morgagni (1682–1771), and in 1789 he travelled to Austria and Germany as physician to Ferdinand IV, king of Naples. An outstanding example of the physician–humanist, Cotugno was devoted to books and accumulated a large library, was well versed in art, architecture, numismatics, and antiquities, and had a great facility in the Latin language.

A Freemason, in 1761 Cotugno published for distribution to friends a plate that traced the course of the nasopalatine nerve, which is responsible for sneezing. Antonio Scarpa acknowledged his priority in the knowledge of this nerve. In the same year his anatomical dissertation De aquaeductibus auris humane internae, following the work of Guichard Joseph Duverney and Antonio Maria Valsalva and anticipating that of Hermann von Helmholtz, described the vestibule, semicircular canals, and cochlea of the osseus labyrinth of the internal ear, demonstrated the existence of the labyrinthine fluid, and formulated a theory of resonance and hearing.

Cotugno wrote a classic monograph on sciatic neuralgia, and is also credited with the discovery of the cerebrospinal fluid in 1774. He investigated smallpox, was deeply concerned with controlling pulmonary tuberculosis, and exemplified to many students the true investigative and selfless spirit in anatomy and medicine. Among his pupils were the surgeon Bruno Amantea, Niccola Andria, and the future military doctor Antonio Savaresi. The Ospedale Domenico Cotugno, hospital in Naples is named for him.

== Associated eponyms ==
- Cotugno's syndrome: A syndrome marked by unilateral neuralgia along the distribution of the sciatic nerve.
- Cotunnius' aquaeduct: The aqueduct of the inner ear.
- Cotunnius' columns: The columns in the osseus spiral lamina of the cochlea.
- Liquor Cotunni: The cerebrospinal fluid.

== Bibliography ==
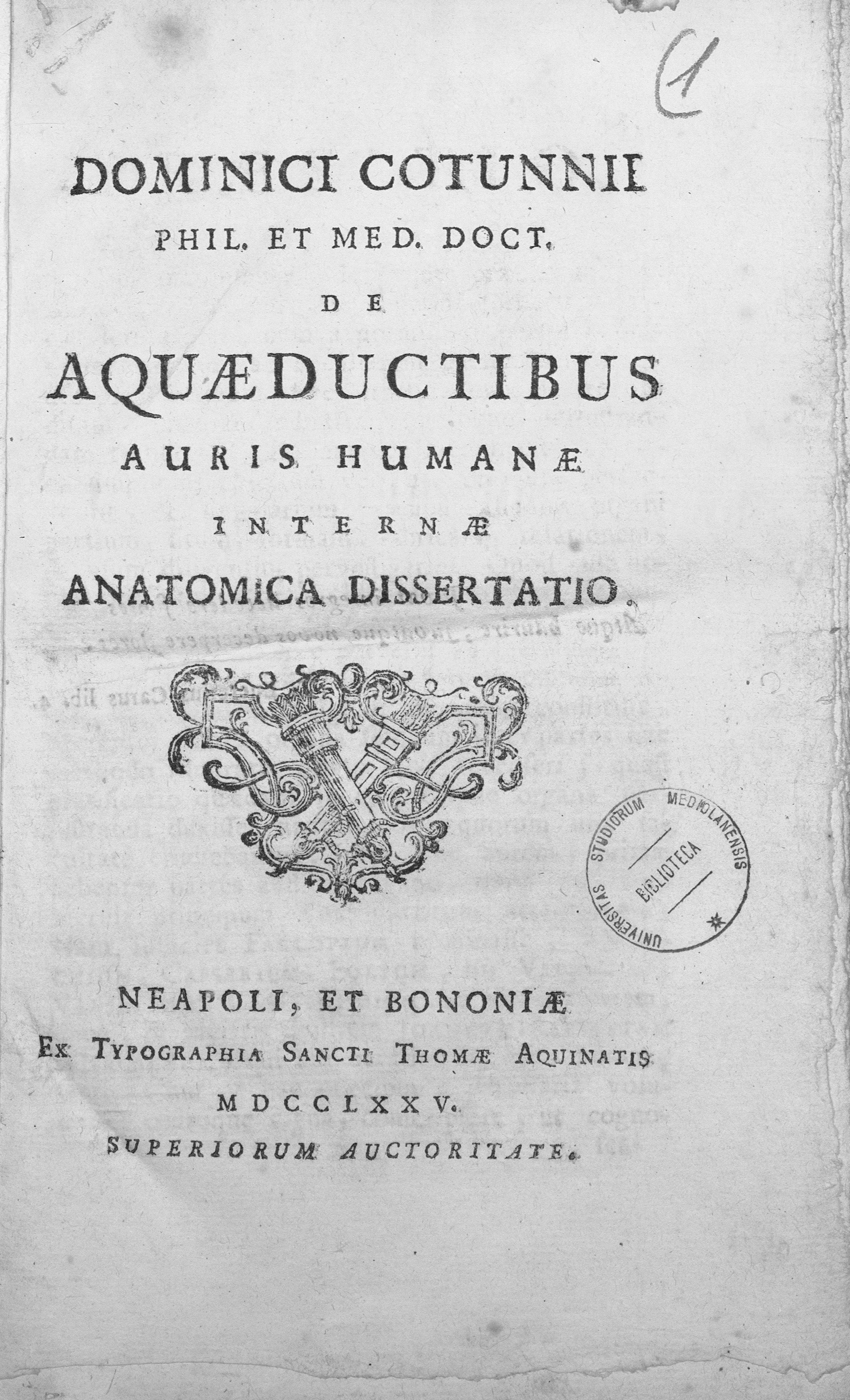
De aquaeductibus auris humanae internae anatomica dissertatio, 1775

- De aquaeductibus auris humane internae anatomica dissertatio. 1761, Ex typographica Sancti Thomae Aquinatis.
- De ischiade nervosa commentarius 1764
- Novis curis auctior 1769
- De sedibus variolarum syntagma 1771
- Dello spirito della medicina 1783
- Opera posthuma. 4 volumes, 1830-1832
