= Niccola Andria =

Italian physician and writer (1748–1814)

Niccola Andria (10 September 1748 – 9 December 1814) was an Italian physician and writer, active in Naples.

== Biography ==
Andria was born near Massafra in Apulia, to a well to do family. His father was a local physician. He initially studied in his native town, then in Naples, where he practiced law, and wrote Discorso politicu su le servitú. He then proceeded to study medicine, learning anatomy under Domenico Cotugno and chemistry under Giuseppe Vairo, and working at the Ospedale degli Incurabili. In 1777, he was appointed professor of agriculture at the University of Naples. From 1801 to 1808 he became professor of physiology, and theoretical medicine. In 1811, he became dean of the medical faculty.

Among his works was a treatise on local mineral waters (1783); and a text Instituzione Chimico-filosofico. This latter text underwent revisions over the years, and the third edition in 1803 abandoned support for the phlogiston theories of Stahl for the more modern studies of Antoine Lavoisier. He published numerous other texts of medicine and physiology.
