= Jean-Étienne Dominique Esquirol =

French psychiatrist (1772–1840)

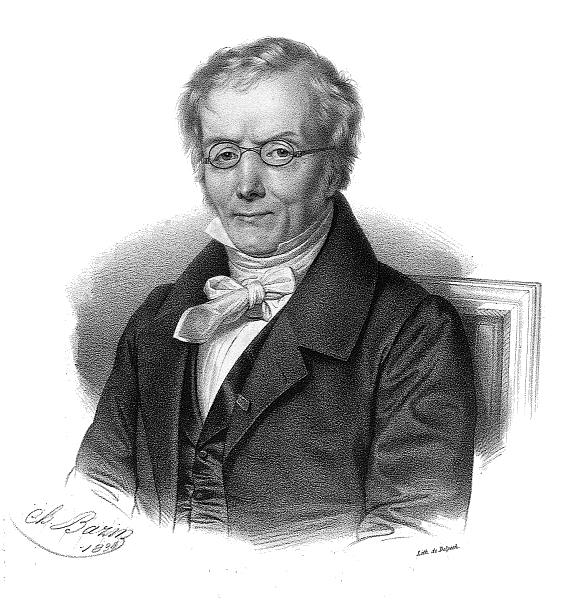
- Jean-Étienne Dominique Esquirol
- Born: 3 February 1772; Toulouse, Kingdom of France
- Died: 12 December 1840 (aged 68); Paris, France
- Scientific career
- Fields: Psychiatry
- Workplaces: Salpêtrière Hospital

Jean-Étienne Dominique Esquirol (3 February 1772 – 12 December 1840) was a French psychiatrist.

== Early life and education ==
Born and raised in Toulouse, Esquirol completed his education at Montpellier. He came to Paris in 1799 where he worked at the Salpêtrière Hospital and became a favorite student of Philippe Pinel.

To enable Esquirol to take up the intensive study of insanity in an appropriate setting, Pinel reportedly put up the security for the house and garden on Rue de Buffon where Esquirol established a maison de santé or private asylum in 1801 or 1802. Esquirol's maison was quite successful, being ranked, in 1810, as one of the three best such institutions in Paris.

In 1805 he published his thesis The passions considered as causes, symptoms and means of cure in cases of insanity. Esquirol, like Pinel, believed that the origin of mental illness could be found in the passions of the soul and was convinced that madness does not fully and irremediably affect a patient's reason.

== Career ==
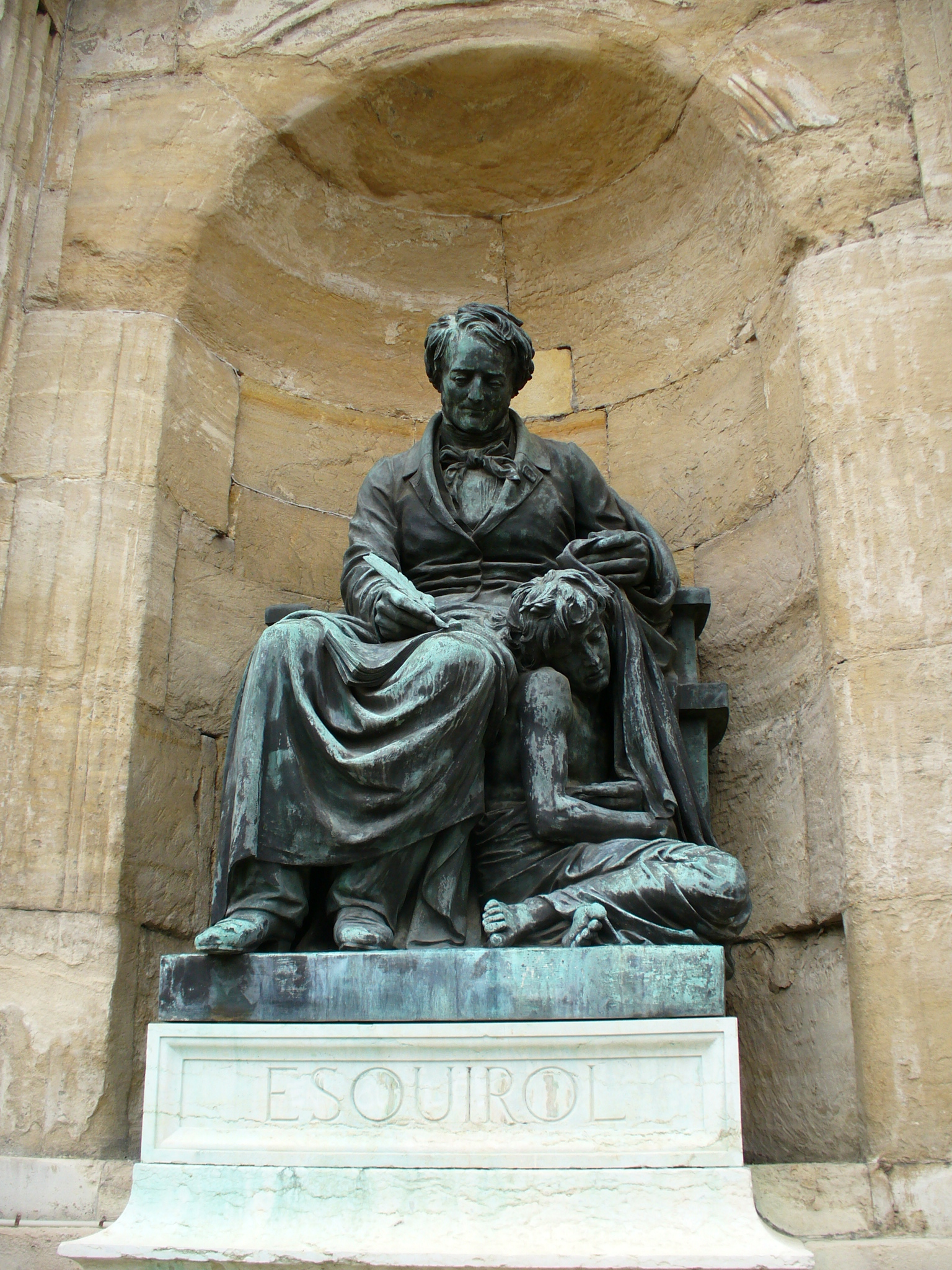
Esquirol hospital in Saint-Maurice (Val de Marne)

Esquirol was made médecin ordinaire at the Salpêtrière in 1811, following the death of Jean-Baptiste Pussin, Pinel's trusted concierge. Pinel chose Esquirol because he was, as Pinel put it, "a physician... devoted exclusively to the study of insanity," arguing that with his many years of maison de santé experience he was the only man suited for the job.

Esquirol saw the question of madness as institutional and national. This was especially true for the poor where he saw the state, with the help of doctors, playing an important role. He also saw an important role for doctors in caring for people accused of crimes who were declared not responsible by reason of insanity. In public controversies over this question he promoted the usefulness of the diagnosis of monomania. By taking such an active role in these public matters, his fame eclipsed that of his teacher Pinel.

In 1817, under the restored Bourbon monarchy, Esquirol initiated a course in maladies mentales in the makeshift quarters of the Salpêtrière dining hall. This was perhaps the first formal teaching of psychiatry in France. It was in 1817 that he coined the word hallucination. At this time he was neither a professor at the Paris faculty or the chief physician at a Paris hospital, but merely a médecin ordinaire. Nonetheless he was reported to have been one of the clinical instructors to whose hospital visits "students flock with a kind of frenzy." He had many very distinguished students.

In 1810, 1814 and 1817 Esquirol, at his own expense, had toured facilities for lunatics throughout France. In 1818 following these trips he wrote a short memoir presented to the minister of the interior and a more detailed description of his findings published in the Dictionnaire des sciences médicales. These articles described, in precise and frightening terms, the conditions in which the insane lived throughout France. They demonstrate that the reforms undertaken in Paris had not penetrated the provinces. Together these two articles constituted a program of reform directed both at the government and the medical profession.

This program consisted of four points:

- First, that insanity should be treated in special hospitals by physicians with special training.
- Second, that reform involved exporting the advances made in Paris to the provinces.
- Third, that "a lunatic hospital is an instrument of cure". By this he meant that the physical structure of new psychiatric hospitals must be designed to support the practice of the new specialty.
- Fourth, Esquirol insisted on the definitive medicalization of the care of the insane. "The physician must be, in some matter, the vital principal of a lunatic hospital. It is he who should set everything in motion… The physician should be invested with an authority from which no one is exempt."

At the behest of the minister of internal affairs, Esquirol next undertook a nationwide survey, visiting all the institutions throughout France where mental patients were confined. In 1822 he was appointed inspector general of medical faculties, and in 1825 director of Charenton Hospice. He became the main architect of the national law of 1838 that instituted departmental asylums for all needy French mental patients and that is still in force today. In 1834, he was elected a foreign member of the Royal Swedish Academy of Sciences.

== Toponyms ==
- Esquirol Square in Toulouse since 1867.
- Esquirol metro station in Toulouse since 1993 on Esquirol Square.
- Esquirol Street in Paris since 1864.
- Esquirol Avenue in Lyon.

== Hospitals ==
- Esquirol hospital in Limoges
- Esquirol hospital in Saint-Maurice
- Esquirol hospital in Caen
- Esquirol - Saint-Hilaire clinic in Agen

== See also ==
- Idée fixe (psychology)
