= Jean-Baptiste Pussin =

French nurse

Jean-Baptiste Pussin (1746–1811) was a French hospital superintendent who, along with his wife and colleague Marguerite, established more humane treatment of patients with mental disorders in 19th-century France. They helped physician Philippe Pinel appreciate and implement their approach which, together with similar initiatives in other countries, became known as moral treatment.

== Events ==
Jean-Baptiste was born in 1746 in Lons-le-Saunier, France, where he worked as a tanner.

In 1771 after being successfully treated for scrofula (tuberculosis of the neck) at Bicêtre Hospital, Pussin was recruited as a member of the hospital staff. In 1784 he attained the position of superintendent of the mental ward, and from 1786 was assisted there by his wife Marguerite.

Pussin advocated a relatively humane treatment, engaged in psychologically-based work with patients, and maintained records regarding his empirical observations and therapeutic proposals. In 1793 he was visited at the Bicêtre by physician Philippe Pinel (1745-1826), who had just started work at the hospital. Pinel was impressed by Pussin's approach and the positive results he had achieved.

In 1797, after Pinel had left, Pussin instituted a reform that permanently banned the use of all chains to restrain patients. Straitjackets continued to be used, however. Not long after Pinel was assigned to the Salpêtrière Hospital, he arranged to have Pussin move there with him, as a special assistant. Chains were then banned there also.

In 1801 Pinel published his Treatise on Insanity, which describes their work. In 1809, in the second edition of the Treatise on Insanity, Pinel reports Pussin’s initiative to ban the use of chains.

Jean Baptiste Pussin died in 1811.

== Clinical approach ==
In Pinel's 1801 Treatise on Insanity, he acknowledges his indebtedness to Jean-Baptiste and Marguerite Pussin and their pioneering contributions to psychiatry. Pinel states that Jean-Baptiste Pussin often defined the psychological approach to be used, because "he lived amongst the insane night and day, studied their ways, their character, and their tastes, the course of their derangements, knows when to be benevolent, when to be an imposing figure...", allowing him to know the individuals more than a physician could by making his rounds.

Pinel describes a case where Jean-Baptiste Pussin "perceived the beginning of a favorable change; wishing to hasten the recovery, he began a series of conversations with the patient in his room, coming gradually to the subject of his delusion. “If you are king,” he said to him, “how come you cannot bring your detention to an end, and why are you mixed up with all these lunatics?” Returning on subsequent days, he continued to talk with him, in benevolent and friendly fashion; he made him see, little by little, the ridiculousness of his pretensions, showed him another patient who had been long convinced of his supreme power and thereby became an object of derision. Shaken by these remarks, he began to question his title of sovereign, and began to recognize his ideas as chimera".

Pinel admires the skill of Marguerite Pussin, who was able to alter "the convictions of a man whose life was endangered by his delusional and infuriated insistence on abstaining from any food. Fearlessly she hops and dances, makes joking remarks, until he smiles, and in his lighter mood he accepts nourishment from her".
