= Jonquières, Tarn =

Jonquières
- Commune
- Coat of arms
- Location of Jonquières
- Location within France Location within Occitanie
- Coordinates: 43°39′00″N 2°07′35″E
- Country: France
- Region: Occitania
- Department: Tarn
- Arrondissement: Castres
- Canton: Plaine de l'Agoût
- Intercommunality: Lautrécois-Pays d'Agout

Government
  - Mayor (2020–2026): Jean-Pierre Lencou
- Area^{1}: 12.2 km^{2} (4.7 sq mi)
- Elevation: 185 m (607 ft)
- Highest elevation: 243 m (797 ft)
- Lowest elevation: 165 m (541 ft)
- Population (2023): 439
  - Density: 36.0/km^{2} (93.2/sq mi)
- Time zone: UTC+01:00 (CET)
  - Summer (DST): UTC+02:00 (CEST)
- INSEE/Postal code: 81109 /81440
- ^{1} French Land Register data, which excludes lakes, ponds, glaciers > 1 km^{2} (0.386 sq mi or 247 acres) and river estuaries.

Jonquières (French pronunciation: [ʒɔ̃kjɛʁ]; Occitan: Jonquièras, meaning reed marshes) is a commune in the Tarn department in southern France.

== See also ==
- Communes of the Tarn department
