= Antonio Sementini =

Neapolitan physician

Antonio Sementini (1743–1814) was a Neapolitan physician.

== Biography ==
Antonio was born in Mondragone and began to study medicine at the age of 12 years at the University of Naples, where he became a professor. Among his many publications were Institutiones Medicae (1780-1784); Institutiones Physiologicae in usum regii Neapolitanum archigymnasii (1794); L'arte de curare malattia (1801); La patologia, ossia della malattia in generale, preceduta per un saggio di esame del sistema de Brown (1803). One of his pupils was Antonio Savaresi.
