= Thomas Arnold (physician) =

English physician and writer

Thomas Arnold (1742 – 2 September 1816) was an English physician and writer on mental illness.

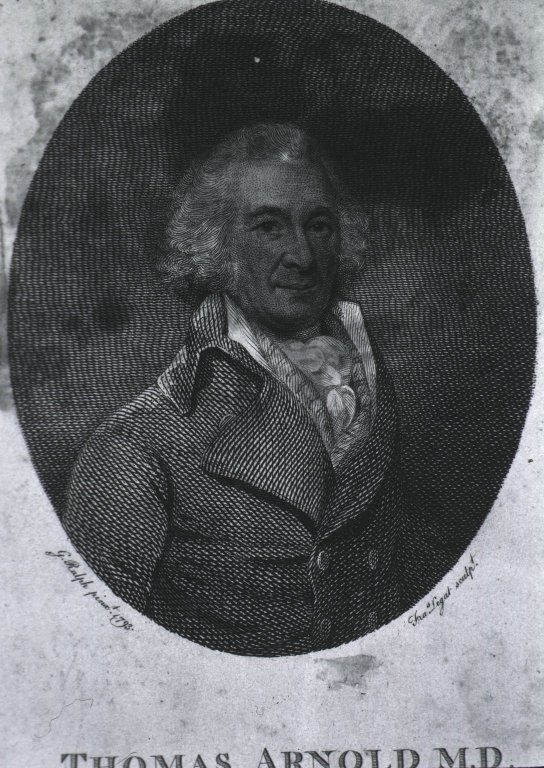
Thomas Arnold, MD

== Life ==
Arnold was born in Leicester. He was educated at the University of Edinburgh, where he took an MD, and became a fellow of the Royal College of Physicians, and of the Royal Medical Society of Edinburgh. While studying medicine at the University of Edinburgh under William Cullen (1710-1790) he became a Freemason and was initiated in the Lodge Holyrood House (Saint Luke), No.44 in 1763. He practised in Leicester, where he became owner and conductor of a large lunatic asylum.

The Leicester Infirmary was established in 1771 to provide medical care to paupers and the poor. Arnold was appointed physician to the infirmary that year. The need for accommodation of insane people soon became evident and an asylum to house lunatics was constructed in 1782 but remained vacant until 1794 because of financial problems. When the asylum opened for patients, Arnold, James Vaughn, and later Robert Bree were appointed physicians. Arnold and Vaughn, both psychiatrists in Leicester were professional rivals over the years. Arnold’s tenure with the Infirmary and asylum lasted from 1721-1776 and 1784-1815. His son, Thomas Graham Arnold received his Medicinae Doctor (MD) at Cambridge University in 1795 and appointed physician to the asylum that same year serving with his father until 1800. Another son, William Withering Arnold, received his MD at Cambridge and served on the asylum staff from 1800 to 1840.

Arnold published a two-volume work titled Observations on the Nature, Kinds, Causes and Prevention of Insanity, the first volume appearing in 1782 and the second in 1806. Volume one included chapters on whether insanity was more common in England than elsewhere, chapters on the definition and arrangement of insanity, and a chapter on the dissected brain. Volume two discussed the causes of insanity and its prevention. A third volume on treatment appeared in 1809.

Arnold’s approach to the treatment of insane people was humane. A set of rules for patients’ treatment included firm management, temperance in food and drink, sleep, exercise, regulation of passions, rational views of God and religion, and attention to the imagination. He opposed the use of chains to control; yet used the straitjacket on patients at times. He proposed a new classification of insanity based upon symptoms when causation was unknown. He noted in his books that the operation of mind and body influenced each other.

Arnold’s classification divided mental illness into two major groups: "ideal" and "notional." Each group contained numerous subdivisions and many were interchangeable. He defined ideal insanity "as that state of mind in which a person imagines he sees, hears or otherwise perceives or converses with persons or things that have no existence … or if he perceives external objects as they really exist has yet erroneous and absurd ideas." (Observations on the Nature, Kinds, Causes and Prevention of Insanity, vol. 1, p. 56.) He described notional insanity as "that state of mind in which a person sees, hears or otherwise perceives external objects as they really exist as objects of sense, yet conceives such notions of powers, properties … as often grossly erroneous or unreasonable to the common sense of the sober and judicious import of mankind." (Observations on the Nature, Kinds, Causes and Prevention of Insanity, vol. 1, p. 57.) Arnold’s classifications of mental illness proved too detailed for general acceptance.

He died at Leicester 2 September 1816.

== Works ==
His main works are:

- Observations on the Nature, Kinds, Causes, and Prevention of Insanity, Lunacy, or Madness, London and Leicester, 1782, 1786.
- A Case of Hydrophobia successfully treated, 1793.
- Observations on the Management of the Insane, 1809.

In the first of these he examined and compared the opinions of ancient and modern writers on the subject. It includes cases related from the author's experience.
