= Tuke (surname) =

Tuke is a surname, and may refer to:

- Anthony Tuke (1920–2001), chairman of Barclays Bank and Rio Tinto Zinc, grandson of W. F. Tuke
- Anthony Tuke (1897–1975), chairman of Barclays Bank, son of W. F. Tuke
- Benjamin Tuke (1870–1936), Irish rugby union footballer
- Blair Tuke (born 1989), New Zealand sailor
- Bob Tuke (born 1947), American politician
- Brian Tuke (died 1545), secretary of Henry VIII and Cardinal Wolsey
- Charles Tuke (architect) (1843–1893), architect
- Charles Tuke (cricketer, born 1857) (1857–1925), English surgeon, working in the field of psychiatric care, and cricketer
- Charles Tuke (cricketer, born 1858) (1858–1929), English-born New Zealand cleric and cricketer
- Daniel Hack Tuke (1827–1895), campaigner for humane treatment of the insane
- Henry Tuke (1755–1814)
- Henry Scott Tuke (1858–1929), British painter and photographer
- Hugh Tuke (1885–1915), New Zealand Army soldier and cricketer
- James Hack Tuke (1819–1896)
- John Batty Tuke (1835–1913), Scottish psychiatrist
- Mabel Tuke (1871–1962), British suffragette
- Margaret Tuke (1862–1947), Principal of Bedford College, London University
- Samuel Tuke (reformer) (1784–1857)
- Sir Samuel Tuke, 1st Baronet (c. 1615–1674), English Royalist officer, playwright and nobleman
- Thomas Tuke (writer) (c.1580–1657), English clergyman and controversial writer
- Thomas Harrington Tuke (1826–1888), British physician who specialised in psychiatry
- W. F. Tuke (1863–1940), chairman of Barclays Bank
- William Tuke (1732–1822), founder of The Retreat at York
- William Murray Tuke (1822–1903), tea merchant and banker, son of Samuel Tuke (1784–1857)

== See also ==
- Tuke family, a Quaker family from York, England
- Took
- Tooke
