= Tuke family =

Family of Quaker innovators

The Tuke family of York were a family of Quaker innovators involved in establishing:

- Rowntree's Cocoa Works
- The Retreat Mental Hospital
- three Quaker schools – Ackworth, Bootham, and The Mount

They included four generations. The main Tukes were:

- William Tuke III (1732–1822), founder of The Retreat at York, one of the first modern insane asylums, in 1792
- Henry Tuke (1755–1814)
- Samuel Tuke (1784–1857)
- James Hack Tuke (1819–1896)

Others included:

- Ann (Tuke) Alexander (1767–1849), daughter of William Tuke III and Esther Tuke, born at York. A pupil of Lindley Murray. In 1796 she married William Alexander of Needham Market in Suffolk, who was one of the Friends associated with her father in the founding of The Retreat Mental Hospital. On the death of her husband in 1841 she moved to Ipswich until she died in 1849.
- William Murray Tuke (1822–1903), who gained his second name from Lindley Murray
- Daniel Hack Tuke (1827–1895), was a prominent campaigner for humane treatment of the insane
- Dame Margaret Jansen Tuke, D.B.E., M.A. (1862–1947) Principal of Bedford College, London University
- Henry Scott Tuke (12 June 1858 – 13 March 1929), British painter and photographer, is best remembered for his paintings of naked boys and young men, which have earned him a status as a pioneer of gay male culture

== See also ==
- "John Tuke, of the city of York, linen-draper, dealer, and chapman" announced on list of "B_K_TS"
- Tuke pedigree

== Sources ==
- Willam K Sessions and E.Margaret Sessions (1971) The Tukes of York in the Seventeenth, Eighteenth and Nineteenth Centuries Ebor Press, York. (Includes family tree of 12 generations, pp. 116–117.)
