= William Tuke (disambiguation) =

William Tuke (1732–1822) was an English tradesman, philanthropist, and Quaker

William Tuke may also refer to:

- William Murray Tuke (1822–1903), British tea merchant and banker
- W. F. Tuke (1863–1940), English banker
