= Tuke =

Tuke may refer to:

== People ==
- Tuke (surname)

== Fictional characters ==
Sue Tuke, a character in the YouTube mockumentary web series Charity Shop Sue, portrayed by Selina Mosinski.

== Other uses ==
- Tüke, Tatarstan, a place in Russia
- Tuke baronets, a title in the Baronetage of England
- Tuke River, a river in New Zealand
- Technical University of Košice, a college in Slovakia
- Tuke, what the Dani people call the plant Karuka
- Tuke, a character from Disney's Brother Bear

== See also ==
- Took, a surname
- Tooke, a surname
- Tuque, a knit cap
- Tukey (disambiguation)
