= Illustrations of the Influence of the Mind upon the Body in Health and Disease =

1872 book by Daniel Hack Tuke

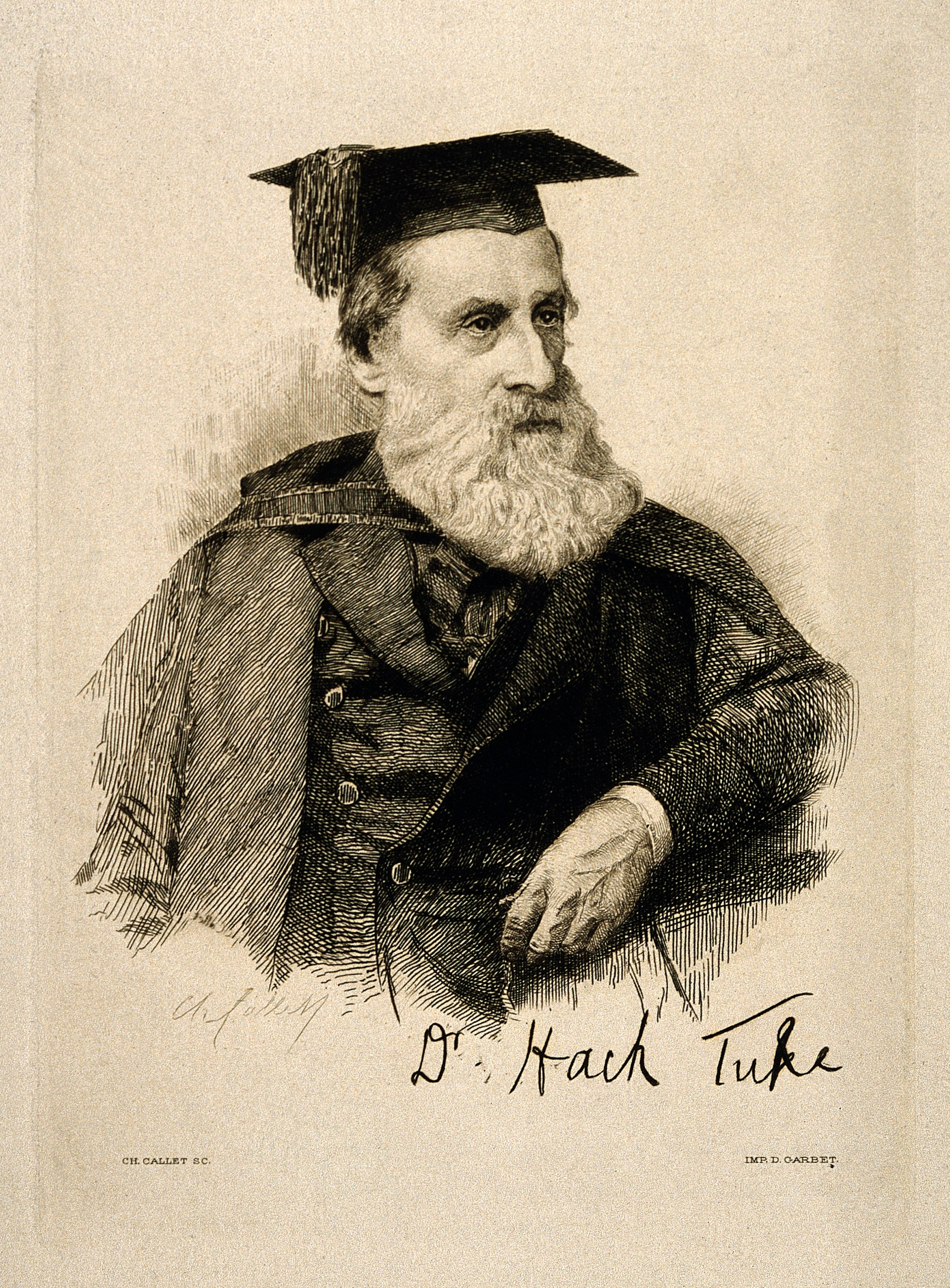
Daniel Hack Tuke, Psychiatrist and author of Illustrations of the influence of the mind upon the body in health and disease, designed to elucidate the action of the imagination

Illustrations of the Influence of the Mind upon the Body in Health and Disease. Designed to elucidate the Action of the Imagination is a non-fictional book written by the psychiatrist Daniel Hack Tuke, published in 1872. In 1873 the book was republished by Henry C. Lea in Philadelphia, as well as 2nd American edition in 1874 by Henry C Lea's Son & Co.

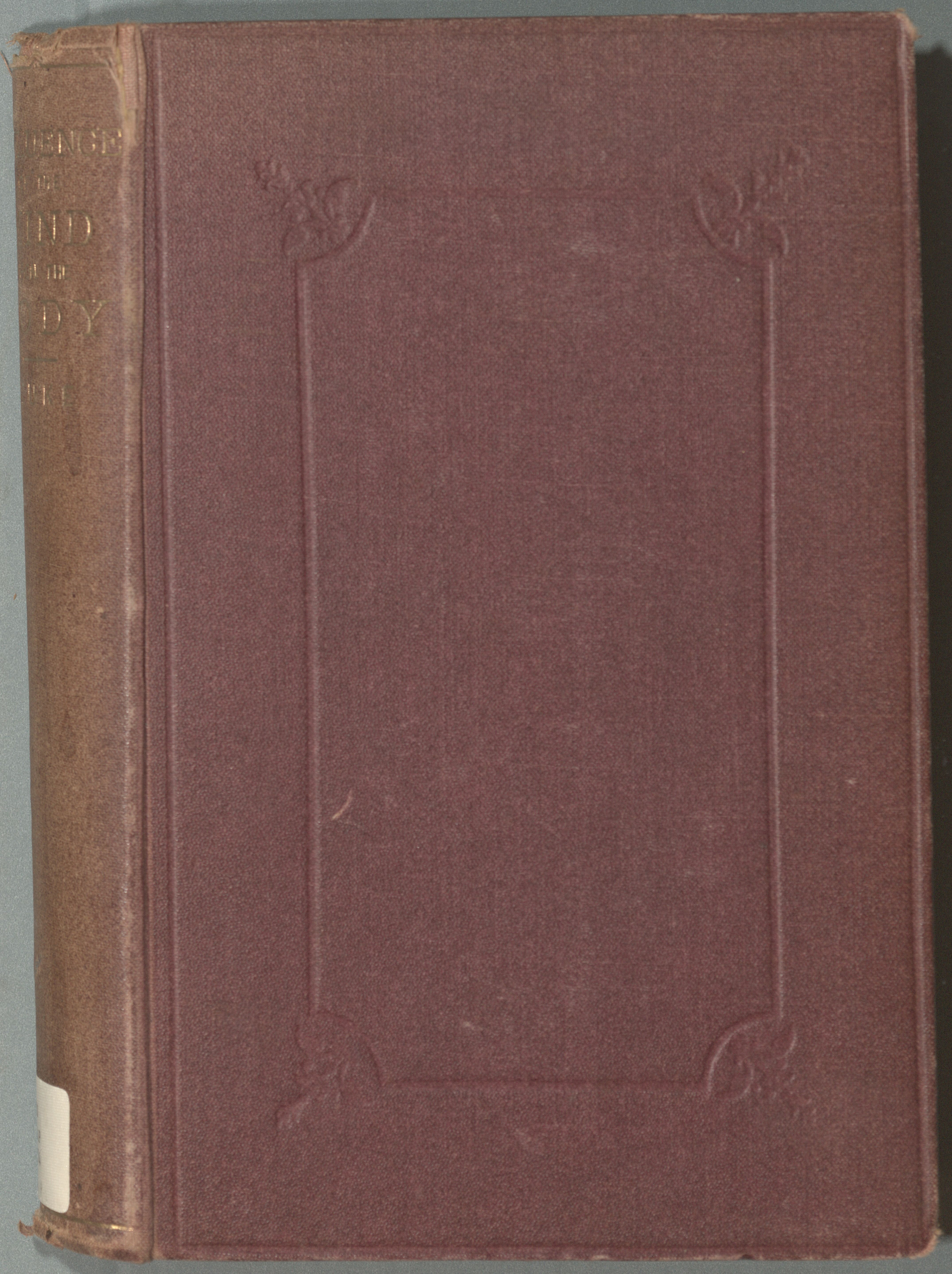
The 1872 edition of Illustrations of the Influence of the Mind upon the Body in Health and Disease. Designed to elucidate the Action of the Imagination by Daniel Hack Tuke, provided by the Special Collection of Maastricht University Library

In his work, the psychiatrist presented a collection of cases that combined his own experiences with reports from other psychiatrists, doctors and lecturers of his time. The objective was to prove the influence of mental states on the physical body in causing and curing disease. Tuke aimed to achieve more acknowledgement and understanding of the mental causes of disorders as well the integration in the treatment of such, coining the term "psycho-therapy".

== Context ==
England, being Tukes place of birth and residence for most of his life, witnessed a time of rapid population growth and improved life conditions for the wealthy population between 1830 and 1900. This marks the historical period known as Victorian era with a notable increase in interest in general science and psychology. Initially, psychology was not viewed as a scientific discipline, which changed over time when it became integrated into the broader domain of scientific inquiry. Victorian psychology was marked by a strong desire for readings and theories based on different approaches than Freudian psychology. Psychology emerged as an inclusive new branch, trying to answer advanced questions, with theories based partially on so-called pseudosciences, such as phrenology, physiognomy, mesmerism as well as the study of extrasensory perception. Such an interdisciplinary approach was maintained in Tukes work. Herbert Spencer, George Lewes and Alexander Bain published widely acknowledged works on the mind which differed from previous opinions, while Thomas Laycock and William Benjamin Carpenter published additional pre-Freudian writings in the 1840s and 1850s, quoted by Tuke in his publications. Victorian Psychology was marked by the continuous conflict between materialism and dualism, specifically the separation and interaction of the material body and the immaterial mind. Around 1870, a strong material shift was reintroduced by experiments of David Ferrier, John Hughlings Jackson and other neurologists, who attempted specific cerebral localisation. Their ambitions to link emotions and thoughts directly to certain brain parts, today known as neural correlates, was recognised by Tuke as he picked up such ideas. Even though bigger acknowledgement was given to dualism and the influence of mental states on the body, the degree and ways of working were not unitedly agreed on. So did some psychologists at the time still consider the mind as passive, merely reacting to inner and outer impressions. Such thoughts are mostly expressed in Victorian novels, while scientific works at the time tried to counteract this idea.

Tuke was introduced to the subject of psychiatry at an early age, as his great-grandfather, William Tuke, was the founder of the York Retreat. His grandfather and father subsequently assumed the role of co-founders, continuing to oversee the management of the facility. His family demanded humane and ethical treatment of those suffering from mental illness, which subsequently informed Tuke's later opinion and professional trajectory. During his visits of mental hospitals, studies at Heidelberg University and career as lecturer he encountered several cases of disorders and phenomena seemingly caused by the states of the mind, which he often felt to be misunderstood or forgotten by his colleagues. The missing consent of general theories at the time motivated Tuke to collect, sort and classify all the medical cases and use such to illustrate his opinion of the influence of mind on the body and health. The general lack of an academic approach to psychiatry led to the general motivation to overcome the predominantly biological, hierarchical theories of mental, physical and cultural differences, which were mainly privileging white men. Tuke held rather liberal attitudes towards socially excluded social classes, dismissing the association which was often made between such and mental diseases. He therefore attempted to analyse the to him presented cases in order to find evidence against such accusations. This motivated him to publish A Manual of Psychological Medicine in 1858 and Insanity among women in 1861, followed by Illustrations of the Influence of the Mind upon the Body in Health and Disease. Designed to elucidate the Action of the Imagination.

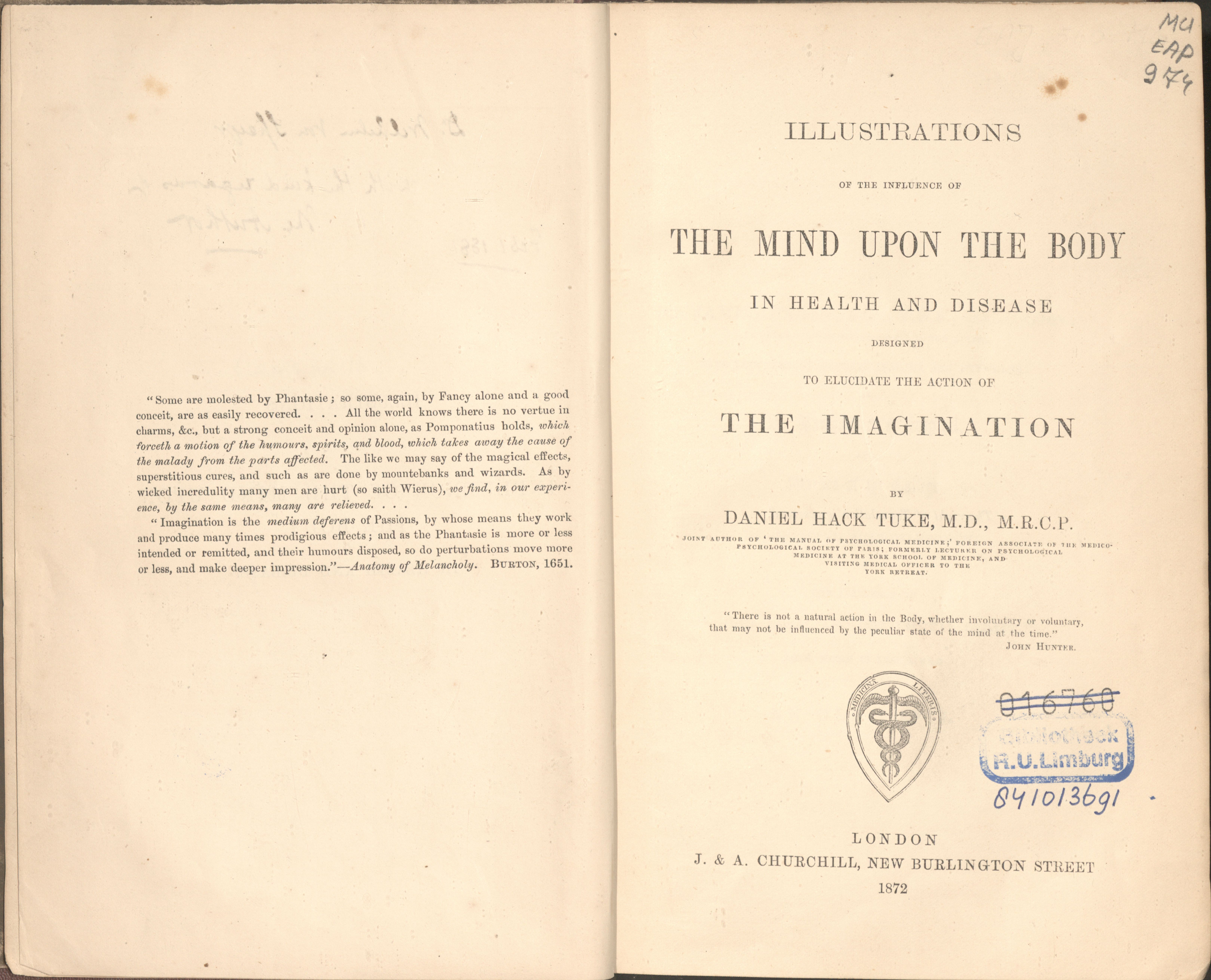
First page of Illustrations of the Influence of the Mind upon the Body in Health and Disease, by Daniel Hack Tuke, provided by the Special Collection of Maastricht University Library

== Contents ==
Tuke aims to illustrate his opinion by reporting critically categorised medical cases to target both laymen and psychologists, psychotherapists and doctors. As he states in the introduction and the last chapter, he hereby hopes to improve general acknowledgement and understanding of mental disorders as well as to increase belief in and use of treatments utilising the impact of mental states, such as hypnotism and braidism, a form of hypnotism brought into practice by James Braid. By proofing the influence of mind he also aims to increase researchers motivation to investigate the underlying mechanism better and improve mentioned treatments.

The book is separated in four parts, one dedicated to each state Tuke interprets the mind as: intellect, emotion and volition (the will) and the last part about the use of knowledge about mental influences on the body in curing disease. All parts end with one to two pages of summary, pointing out the main takeaways for the reader.

=== Intellect ===
The impact of imagination is illustrated by aligning it with its psychological and physiological principles. Tuke admits the general lack of consensus on interpretations of subjective experiences, such as distinguishing externally caused sensations, emotions and inner free will. The dualistic interaction problem between mind and body is a constant issue which Tuke illustrates by providing different opinions. Tuke explains the impact of attention on mental states, with references to Plato, Cicero and Kant for different ideas on the origin of mental states and ideas.

The intellect is described to excite, suspend or induce excessive or morbid sensations, such as hyperaesthesia and dyseasthesia. Exact mechanism remain unclear, both Dr. Carpenter and Herbert Spencer are quoted for attempts to explain the origin of impressions. Bacons experimentum crucis is referred to in illustrating the involuntary imitation of others and the impact of attention on a certain body part which induces different sensations.

=== Emotion ===
Emotions are often followed by ideational, emotional or volitional acts. While the origin of emotions is not agreed on, some possibilities, such as the epigastric brain centre, the solar plexus or medulla oblongata are listed. Emotions might excite or suspend sensations, there however exists a hardship in distinguishing mental from bodily feelings.

Regarding the voluntary muscles, Tuke states three bodily phenomena which may be caused by emotions:

- movements
- spasms and Convulsions
- paralysis

Examples of epilepsy caused by mental excitement, stammering and cases of developed diseases such as hydrophobia through mere imagination; Tetanus and Catalepsy possibly caused merely by belief of transmission, as well as the use of emotions in hypnosis are discussed. The author emphasises, that several emotions can impact the same glands and organs and, therefore share similar effects, which may differ among people and intensity of emotions.

=== Volition ===
Tuke describes the difference between will and volition, often confused in daily wording. Volitional acts may stem from combined actions of intellect and emotions, with different pathways discussed by the author. The will may act upon sensations, possibly inducing hallucinations by acting upon both voluntary and involuntary muscles as well as organic functions. This section is held short, with a conclusion about the indirect influence of will.

In the end, Tuke makes a final distinction:

- Intellect mainly works on the brain, through nerves causing sensations.
- Emotions mostly impact heart and lungs, vessels and glands and therefore impact organic functions.
- Will instead influences mainly motor muscles, leading to movements.

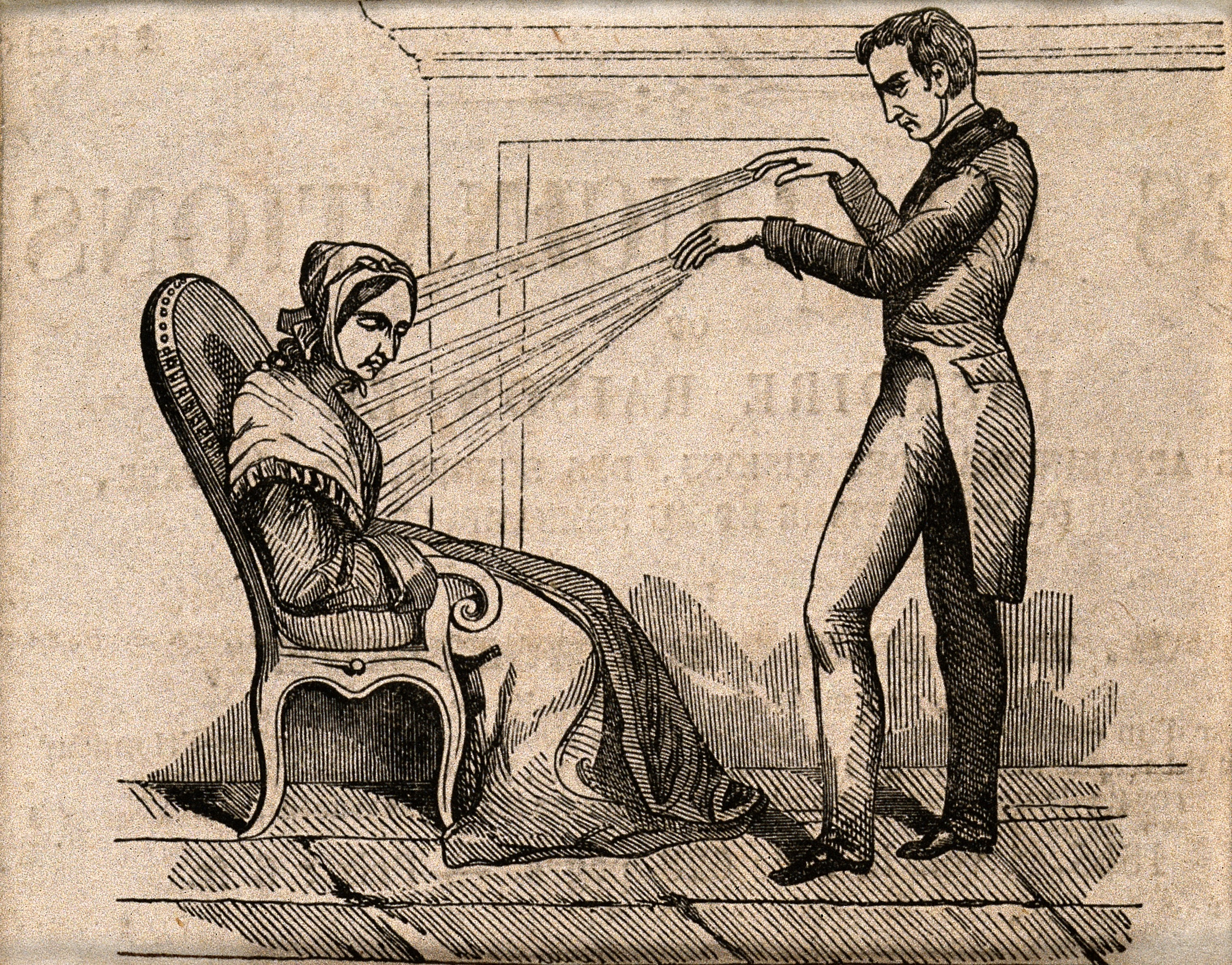
Mesmerism, also known as animal magnetism

=== Influence of the mind upon the body in the cure of disease ===
The last part of the book is dedicated to psychological and physiological principles underlying mental treatments. The author refers to hypnotism, animal magnetism or mesmerism as well as the role of imagination, emotion, intellect and will in the cure of disorders of sensations, muscles and organs by including several individual patient cases. Psycho-therapeutics are introduced to illustrate ways of using mental states to relieve disordered patients for example by arousing the will, causing expectation and hope and directing attentional focus.

== Reception ==
Later published editions by Henry C. Lea and his son in America indicate the general global acknowledgement of the book. Illustrations of the Influence of the Mind upon the Body in Health and Disease. Designed to elucidate the Action of the Imagination is mainly referenced in books and articles about hypnosis, such as Edmonston, W. E., Jr.'s The induction of hypnosis and Ramesh's Thought-forms and Hallucinations, dating from the publication until the 21st century. Other references include the placebo effect, like in Franklin G. Miller's The Placebo. A Reader. (2013). This signifies the acknowledgement of evidence given by Tuke, illustrating the reality of such highly discussed phenomena. The concept of “Mind Healing” is mentioned in association with Tukes work, signifying the general upheaval of the concept at the time. Illustrated cases in his work give evidence to such theoretical approaches of late-nineteenth-century psychologists and psychiatrists in attempting to utilise the influence of the mind on the body to cure disease and maintain health, motivating them to realise such practices. Generally, the work and the author are acknowledged to have improved the understanding and care of the mentally ill at the time, both by increasing the understanding of mental causes of disorders as well as proposing solutions to relieve such.

In the 21st century, Illustrations of the Influence of the Mind upon the Body in Health and Disease is regarded as a seminal text in the field of psychology, notable for the first-ever occurrence of the term 'psycho-therapeutics'. This term is perceived to have fostered the conceptions of psychological disorder, well-being and identity. While Tuke does receive credit for introducing the concept, he is likewise criticised for a vague and broad usage of the term, making the interpretation of his ambitions difficult. Some consider that reinterpreting and understanding his beliefs of the benefits of hypnotism and suggestion might prove beneficial in light of the limitations of materialistic approaches. In reality there is still little distinction between psychological and somatic aspects of symptoms and therapies, showing that Tuke's work did not achieve the influence he aspired to. In critical reviews of the history of psychiatry Tuke is accused to have adopted the racist standpoint of his time, particularly in view of certain linguistic choices he made in his work. Lacking consensus and critical interpretations of this issue makes a judgement difficult, as Tuke's wording is generally in line with other authors of his time, such as Charles Dickens, and might be misinterpreted, caused by the change of meaning of words over time. Authors of review articles therefore call for a more critical analysis and interpretation of Tuke's work. Additional criticism targets the authors limitation to rather materialist standpoints, which he tried to overcome, but which still provided the basis of his education and work, and for having taken on a spiritual side in psychology in his work.

Tukes publication led him to become an influential governor at the Bethlem Royal Hospital in the late nineteenth century, significantly impacting the field of psychiatry. From 1880 on he worked with Dr. G. Savage on the Journal of Mental Science (now The British Journal of Psychiatry) for sixteen years. Later works include Sleep-walking and hypnotism (1884), following up on cases and phenomena introduced in his previous publications. Tuke referred to himself as a compiler of information rather than a provider, which aligns with the tendency of scientists to overlook a substantial part of his work.
