= Anthony Tuke =

Anthony Tuke may refer to:

- Anthony Tuke (1897–1975), chairman of Barclays Bank
- Anthony Tuke (1920–2001), chairman of Barclays Bank
