= Samuel Tuke =

Samuel Tuke may refer to:

- Sir Samuel Tuke, 1st Baronet (c.1615–1674), English Royalist officer, playwright and nobleman
- Samuel Tuke (reformer) (1784–1857), Yorkshire-born Quaker philanthropist and mental-health reformer
