= Männerschande – Frauenknechtschaft =

1918 book by Helene Eiert

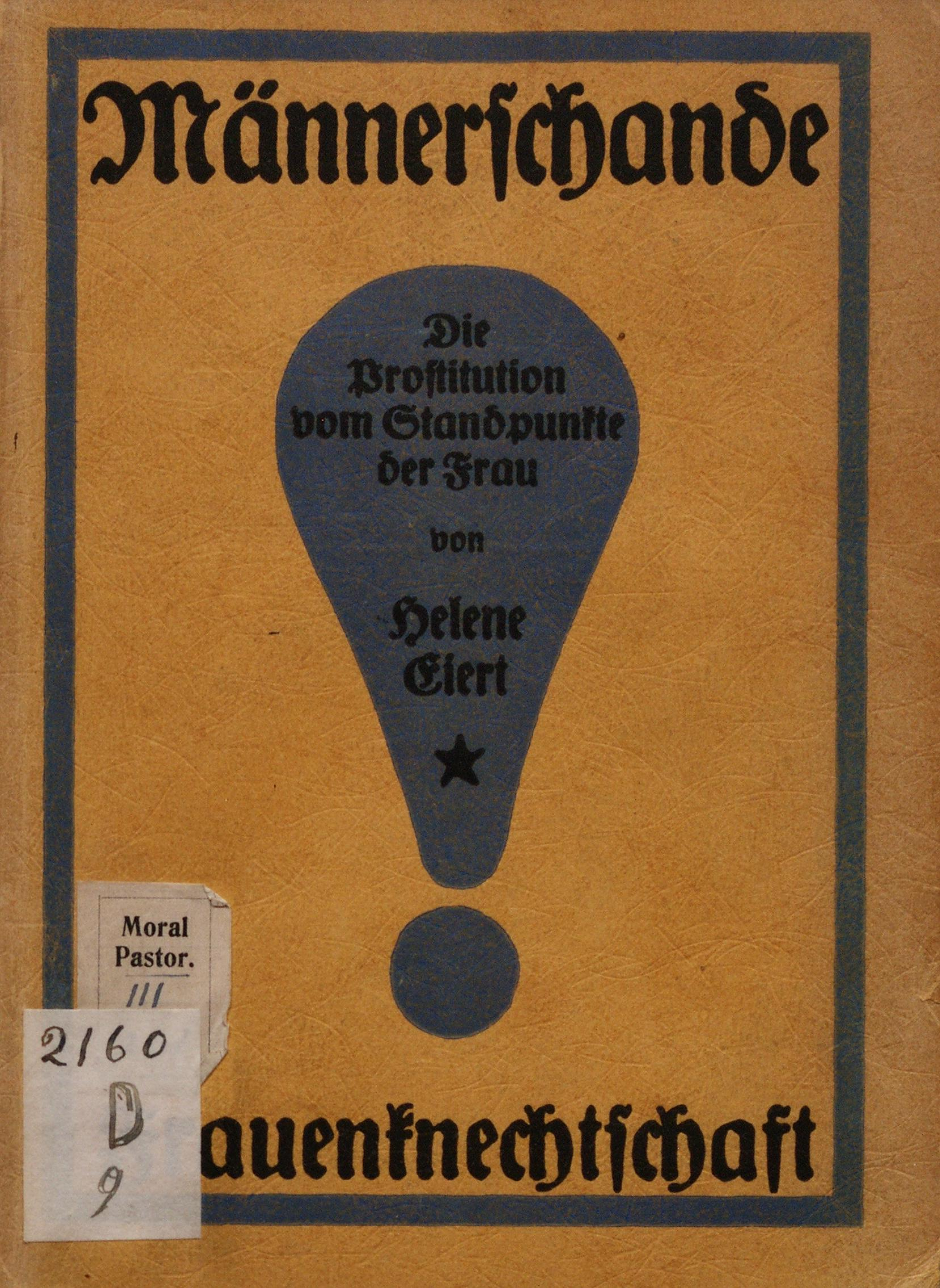
Title page

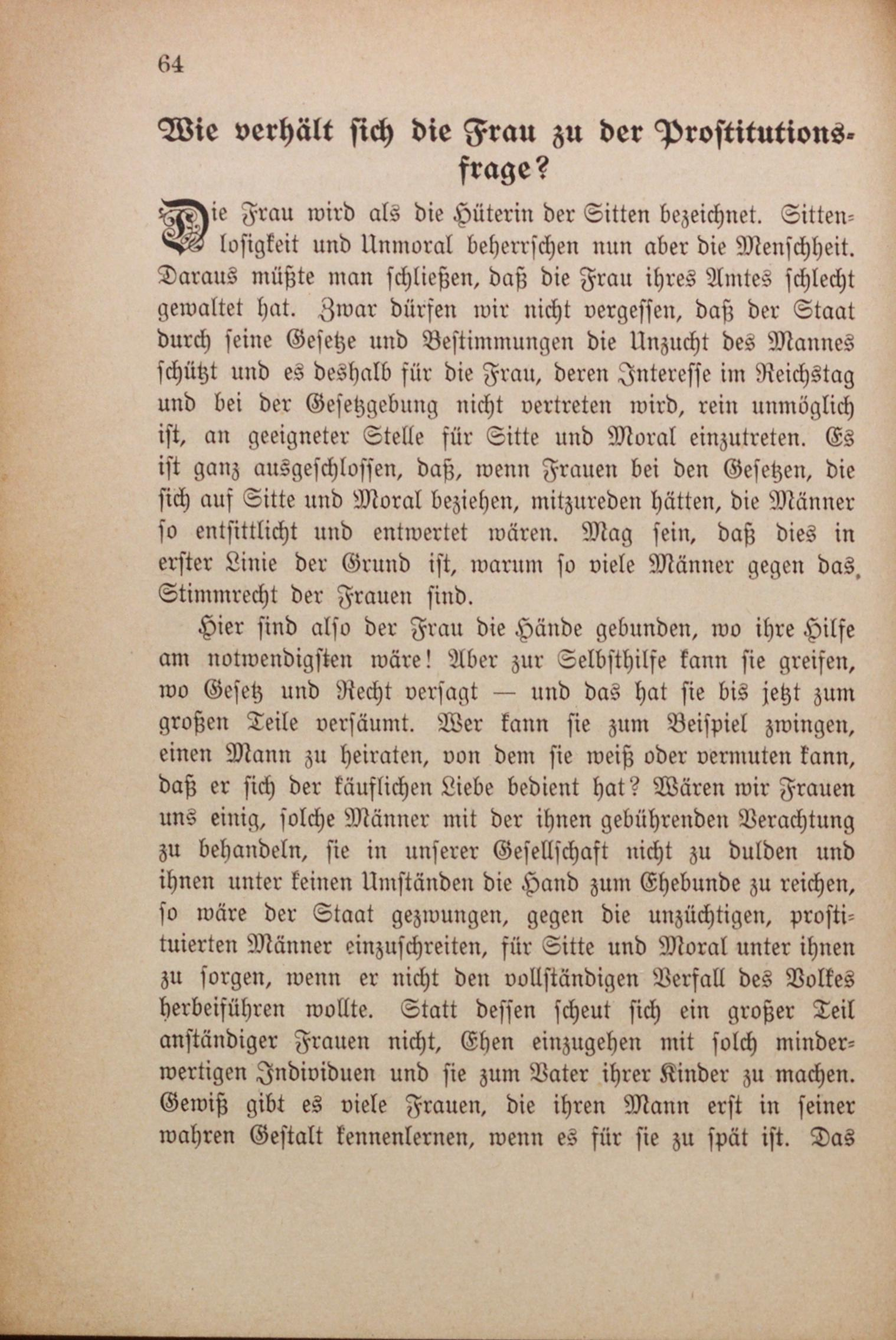
Page from the book

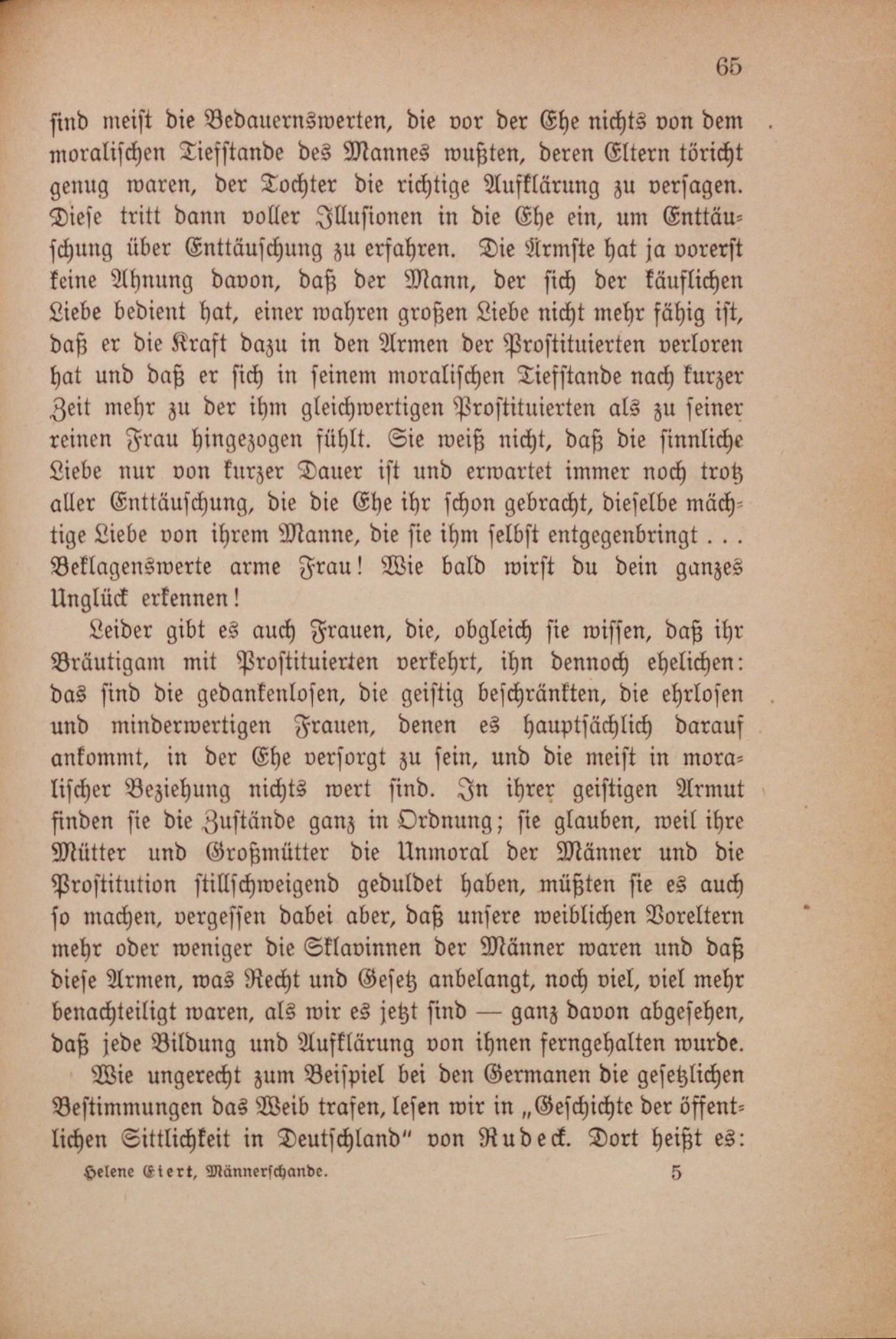
Page from the book

Männerschande – Frauenknechtschaft: die Prostitution vom Standpunkte der Frau: ein offenes Wort an die Männer (English: Shame of Men – Women's Slavery. Prostitution from Women's Viewpoint. An Open Word to Men) is a book written by German author Helene Eiert. It was published in 1918 through a publishing house called "Volksheil", using the "Universitätsbuchdruckerei Styria", a university press under Styria Media Group in Graz, Austria, a press traditionally known for printing newspapers such as the Grazer Zeitung and the Volksblatt, until expanding its services to publishing books in 1886.

The aim of the book is to argue that prostitution has poisoned Germany's good citizens, especially men. Within 124 pages, Eiert illustrates how prostitution leads to the decay of men's morals and values, and states her opinion on what has to be done to rectify the situation.

== Context ==
The German author Helene Eiert dedicated the majority of her literary works towards criticising the moral decay of the German society. Throughout her career, Eiert is continuously associated with the works of the university professor Dr. Johannes Ude (1874–1965), the chairman of the "Völkerwacht" (English: People's watch) society at the time, in Graz. Additionally, he played a leading role in the Austrian catholic life reform. Ude was known to have several radical opinions regarding public matters. Throughout his lifetime he publishes literature and advocates against capitalism, alcoholism, smoking, the consumption of meat, political corruption, and war. Moreover, he argues that abortion is murder, homosexuality is perversion and state sanctioned prostitution must be banned. He shares both the latter convictions and his proximity to the catholic religion with Eiert. Especially during discussions concerning sexual hygiene and attempts of purifying movies, theatre performances and advertisements of sexual content, Eiert's opinion was often regarded. She was one of the only women to have a voice in such matters, which inspired her to publish literary works of her own. Her strong opinions and explicit way of expressing these, made Eiert one of the protagonists in the morality movement, a wing of the women's movement, around 1900.

The first wave of the German women's movement took place in the late 19th century and was inspired by the more progressive feminism movements and strive towards gender equality in other European countries, specifically France and Great Britain. Sex was regarded as a highly sensitive and taboo topic. Especially for women, who found themselves at the bottom of the social gender hierarchy, sexuality was associated with shame – something better to be silent about. From the 1880s onwards, the women's movement created grounds for discussing sexual topics publicly. Prostitution was one of the most striking topics of debate in this time. This made fighting for the abolishment of state regulated prostitution a major objective of middle-class German women, a movement called "Abolitionismus" (English: Abolitionism). German women argued that as long as the state allows and sanctions prostitution, it is impossible to lift public moral. A wide spread convention amongst men in government positions was that prostitution is a necessary evil and could not be removed from society. The double standards that prostitution represents, allowing men to satisfy their carnal desires while tarnishing women's reputation and social standing, hinders Germany's men from regaining the honour necessary to serve their country.

During World War I, over nine million soldiers lost their lives, of which over two million were German soldiers. Commercial prostitution played a large role during the war. Not only was it popular for soldiers to visit brothels, but prostitution was also wide spread at the battle front. Military doctors were largely responsible for sanitary and phycical examinations. Some brothels were even run by the military privately. Hereby there were clear regulations for the women that could work for men of high military rank and those who could served soldiers exclusively. Although these women underwent mandatory medical checks to prevent the spread of sexual transmitted infections, they were only moderately successful. Additionally, the war harboured many illegal prostitutes who did not submit to health checks. The German "Wehrmacht" estimated that about two million absences of German soldiers during World War I were due to infectious diseases, mostly caused by sexually transmitted infections such as syphilis and gonorrhea.

== Contents ==
The book consists of a "Geleitwort" (English: foreword), an introduction, and 15 subsequent chapters in which Eiert makes her case against state sanctioned prostitution.

=== Foreword ===
The foreword of the book is written by the Austrian university professor Dr. Johannes Ude. He states that the book written by Eiert is an act of desirable women's emancipation. He describes her text as fearless in exposing the shameful behaviour of men, and the hypocritical and prude attitudes of women. He stresses that only if both men and women acknowledge the truths presented in this book, can prostitution finally be banned and morality in Germany's men be restored. Throughout the book, Eiert refers to Dr. Ude's ideas and statistics to support her arguments.

=== Introduction ===
The introduction of the book describes the conversation of three women at tea. Eiert describes that the narrated scene took place in Russia in 1914, before the start of World War I. Together with a French and a Russian lady, Eiert discusses prostitution and the situation in their respective countries. The women establish the moral superiority of the female gender. The French lady describes how the emancipation of women has allowed them to enjoy life in a similar way to men. She describes how the French attitude towards women's sexuality has changed allowing many women to indulge and explore their sexuality, even outside of a marriage. The Russian lady has a similar attitude. She even mention that there should be brothels for women to satisfy their sexual needs too.

Eiert argues that prostitution leads to the moral decay of anyone engaging in it. She scorns the way these women believe equality will be achieved by sinking down to the same level of men, which would result from committing the same moral crimes as men do. According to Eiert, the only hope is for women to compensate for the men's lack of honour and try to lift them to higher moral standings. Additionally, Eiert looks down on the French and Russian women's cultures. She argues that the declining population of France is due to the women's loss of duty towards their country. Eiert makes clear that any German women's goal should be to supply the "Vaterland" with healthy offspring. Bearing children, should be the only motivation for a proper woman to engage in sexual activities with her husband.

=== Developments throughout the chapters of the book ===
Throughout the book, Eiert shifts her focus between addressing different players in what she believes to be a moral crisis as a result of prostitution. The titles of her chapters are clear in defining who or what will be criticised within the next couple of pages. "Den Männern an der Spitze des Volkes ein freies Wort" (English: A free word to the men at the head of the state) and "Ein paar Worte über Frauenmode" (English: A few words about women's fashion) are example of such titles. Eiert's main focus is to show how men are to blame for the moral decay of the times. In addition, Eiert also acknowledges additional factors that propagate the shameful social developments, including the prostitutes themselves, woman who wear provoking clothing, and alcohol.

Eiert makes the following main arguments:

- Women are morally superior to men.
- Germany's men have become morally foul due to their involvement with prostitutes.
- Men who pay for sex, lose all honour and dignity and should be made aware of that. She makes this point using harsh language and equating men who sleep with prostitutes, with maggots and other vermin.
- Prostitutes are the scum of society. Eiert states that most prostitutes suffer from alcoholism.
- Prostitution leads to the spread of diseases which will not only harm men, but also their wives and children.
- Prostitution, the honour-less men, and the disease casualties, are a main reason why Germany lost the war.
- There exists double standards regarding chastity and purity. Men are expected to engage in premarital sex (often with prostitutes), but women must be virgins when entering a marriage.
- Besides common misconceptions at the time, Eiert states that not engaging in sexual behaviour before marriage, is not unhealthy for men. Abstinence is the only way to become an honourable man, husband and father.
- A woman should rather choose to die or live a single life, than marry a man who has previously engaged in prostitution.
- Society is run by men. Morally weak men (the majority) cannot control their carnal impulses. Men make the rules and men work in their favour. This is the reason why sanctioned prostitution exists.
- Alcohol is a major factor that drives a man to visit a brothel and engage in commercial sex. It weakens a man's sense of morality. Honourable men should therefore stay away from alcohol.
- The only point of having sexual affairs is to conceive children with one's husband. Women must take this role seriously and not succumb to the carnal pleasures of sex.
- To some extent it is the fault of women and how they dress, that men act in sexually inappropriate ways. Eiert argues that women's fashion is too sexually arousing. She argues that sometimes one cannot blame men for having to seek sexual gratification, or even raping girls although it is morally wrong.
- It is the duty of all mothers to raise their sons to be honourable men that would rather die than sleep with a prostitute. Only then can a new generation of proper men evolve.

To make these statements Eiert refers to statistics and studies. She often illustrates her perspective with short stories and anecdotes. When arguing about the double standards of men and women in regards to chastity and extramarital affairs, Eiert draws up a conclusive historical overview of how women compared to men were punished and tortured for such crimes. Throughout the book, Eiert makes use of very strong language and is not afraid to wish death on people she believes have morally failed. She continuously stresses the moral superiority of women over men.

== Reception ==
Eiert's controversial "Männerschande – Frauenknechtschaft" was both celebrated and criticised. The book and Eiert's ideas found support among the members of the Völkerwacht as it backed Eiert's and Dr. Ude's cause in the abolitionist movement. Other members of society were not very pleased about the publication. After the release of the book in 1918, Eiert received letters from enraged men, who felt wrongly judged. In response to these comments, Eiert wrote s second edition of the book, published in 1920, in which she added a chapter called "Ein Wort an alle irregeführten Männer" (English: A word to all misguided men). In this chapter she addresses all men who have only ever paid for sex once in their lives and soon regretted it. Although she argues that this misstep is inexcusable, she says that there might be a way to regain at least some integrity. Men who acknowledge their mistake, should prevent other young men from making similar mistakes in the future. This can for example be done by education young men about the lacking health risks of pre marital sexual abstinence.

=== The development of the Abolitionism movement ===
After World War I, the fear of spreading sexual transmitted infections grew significantly. This worry and the changing social attitudes, benefited the cause of the abolitionist movement, who worked towards banning prostitution. In 1918 the state issued the Verordnung zur Bekämpfung der Geschlechtskrankheiten (English: Ordinance to Combat Sexually Transmitted Infections) until the Gesetzes zur Bekämpfung der Geschlechtskrankheiten (English: Law to Combat Sexually Transmitted Infections) was instated in 1927. In 1923, the abolitionism movement celebrated their largest victory. A law to ban brothels, punish endangerment of contracting a sexual transmitted infection and endorse punishment for offences against public morality. The "Reichsrat" objected this law within the same year, so that it was never enforced. Prostitution was regulated by the state again and remained decriminalised. During the time of World War II, when the National Socialists took over the government of Germany in 1933, any progress made by women of the abolitionism movement was destroyed. Even after the war, when Germany was split into the GDR and the FRG, efforts to ban prostitution were scarce. Only in the 1960s did the new women's movement begin to flourish. Again, prostitution was heavily debated. This time, there were many more opinions and perspectives regarding the topic. Not all women belonging to the movement wanted to see prostitution completely banned. From 2014 onwards, the number of people convinced that abolitionism is the only right path, has increased again, in Germany.

=== Eiert's career after "Männerschande – Frauenknechtschaft" ===
After publishing "Männerschande – Frauenknechtschaft" in 1918, Eiert continues to write socially critical novels. In 1927 she publishes "Doppelmoral" (English: Double standards). The theme of double standards is a predominant aspect of "Männerschande – Frauenknechtschaft" which appears to be picked up again in her subsequent literary works. In 1931 Eiert publishes "Du sollst nicht..." (English: You must not...). Due to their socially criticising content and mentioning of taboo topics, the works of Eiert were not very popular during World War II. Between the years 1938 and 1941, the "Reichsschriftkammer" drew up a list of forbidden literature. This list included nearly five thousand individuals publications, including Eiert's latest publication, "Du sollst nicht...".

Today Eiert's "Männerschande – Frauenknechtschaft" is part of a closed stack, historical book collection (Special Collections) of the Inner City Library belonging to Maastricht University in the Netherlands.
