= Insanity in Ancient and Modern Life =

Insanity in Ancient and Modern Life, with chapters on its prevention is a medical book written by the English physicist and practical worker in medicinal psychology Daniel Hack Tuke (1827-1895) in 1878. Tuke dedicated much of his time encouraging humanitarian treatment for the mental ill. His knowledge is summarized and clarified in many of his medical books, in which he often takes controversial and novel standpoints. The presented book discusses the causes of mental disorders in relation to the maturation of society and considers factors which can positively contribute to the prevention of psychiatric diseases.

== Historical context ==
Being part of the movement dynamic psychotherapy in the later 19th century, Tuke is acknowledged to be one of the earliest authors to coin the term "Psychotherapeutics". He combines psychological insights similar to Freud's psychodynamic therapy with a medical and somatic approach that Tuke adopted from his studies of medicine. Living in a time in which mental illness is no longer regarded as the consequence of having committed a religious sin, a more biological basis and environmental foundation of psychiatric diseases was established. An especially pronounced insight of this viewpoint is that mental illness is caused by genetical factors as well as influenced by nurture and is therefore treatable and may be even preventable.

=== The breakthroughs of the 19th century ===
In the 17th and 18th centuries there was a gradually increasing focus on the brain itself and how brain injury affects behavioral displays like in the famous case of Phineas Gage. Additionally, a growing interest in reflexes facilitated the viewpoint that behavior is not necessarily self-generated but can be also environmentally caused. However, despite the huge medicinal and factual progress in the study of the brain and its influence on behavior, the new insights did not yet contribute to an improved treatment of psychiatric diseases and brain injuries. Although there was an increasing interest in mental processes and behavior, until the middle of the 19th century psychology as a scientific study and subject itself was largely disregarded and rather considered to be a branch of philosophy.

Irrevocably, this mindset turned enormously due to five scientific discoveries that enabled the development of modern neurophysiology and are still relevant for today's psychology. They were the discovery of the 1) cerebrospinal axis, 2) the growing impact of the reflex and its relation to mental functioning in studies by Marshall Hall (1790-1875), 3) the localization of brain functions such as the center of speech production (Broca's Area), 4) the discovery of the nerve cell by Camillo Golgi (1843-1926) and lastly, the 5) disentangling of the communication between neurons by Ramón y Cajal (1852-1934). All these findings consider a biological and physical basis by which behavior can be explained. This is also an opinion held by Tuke himself, as he not only waited for a proof of a physical basis for normal behavior but also as an explanation for what he terms "insanity".

=== The emergence of experimental psychology ===
Although psychology as an independent scientific study was largely discredited by well-known scientists and philosophers such as Immanuel Kant (1724-1804), scientists such as Johann Friedrich Herbart (1776–1841), took the issue as a reason to invent a mathematical basis for scientific psychology. Despite his unsuccessful attempts to quantify behavior, his efforts were taken up by the scientists Ernst Heinrich Weber (1795–18 78) and Gustav Theodor Fechner (1801–1887), aiming to measure the mathematical relationships between the physical magnitudes of external stimuli and the psychological intensities of the resulting sensations. Their vast and unique insights are later coined by the term "Psychophysics". Meanwhile, the breakthroughs in neuronal structure and physiology (the five most important listed above), evidenced a physical and biological nature of human functioning that can serve as the basis for scientific experiments in studying behavior. One of the principal founders of experimental physiology, Hermann Helmholtz (1821–1894), conducted experimental studies of a wide range of topics that would later be of huge interest to psychologists. The speed of neural transmission, the physical natures of sound and color and our perception of them count as some of the most important insights. Together with the German physiologists, psychologists and philosopher Wilhelm Wundt (1832-1920) he addressed more complicated psychological questions than had not been investigated experimentally in the past. Of particular interest for both was the nature of apperception, which is defined as the point at which a perception occupies the central focus of conscious awareness. To conduct all the studies, in 1879, Wundt founded the first laboratory worldwide that was specifically dedicated to original research in experimental psychology. Tuke himself as a physicist was largely interested in the practical and experimental part of psychology and psychiatry but contributed to the development of experimental psychology mainly by providing theories and hypothesis about biological and environmental factors that influence the mind and also cause mental illnesses. His research and findings are majorly based on observational studies and analysis of existing literature and statistics.

== Content ==
The presented book discusses the causes of mental disorders in relation to the maturation of society and considers factors which can positively contribute to the prevention of psychiatric diseases. By considering the ecological and social conditions of people, starting in prehistoric times until the late nineteen hundreds, it is analyzed in twelve chapters how these factors and a steady growth in complexity of civilizations contribute to an alleged increase in prevalence of mental illnesses. He claims, that emotional and cognitive conflict is a natural human response to life's injuries, which he defines as the rapidly changing lifestyle during the British Industrial revolution from the Mid-18th century to early 19th century and the rising gap between the rich and the poor. Consequently, the majority of insane people would always be found in a civilized community.

=== Causes of insanity ===
In the first chapter, Tuke gives a broad overview about the diverse set of factors that he considers to be of vital importance when answering what causes and influences the development of insanity. By doing this, he acknowledges biological, societal, environmental, cultural, as well as religious and political factors. He claims, that all these factors accumulate and increase in intensity when societies became more complex and civilized.

==== Intoxication and defective nourishment ====
Throughout history, intoxication could be found in almost any community, especially the consume of alcohol but also of other stimulants. The intake of mind- and mood-altering drugs is distributed in time and space. Tuke claims, that intoxication leads to the exhaustion of the nervous system and inhibits it to function properly. This degeneration would accumulate in succeeding generations, especially when considering the increasing importance alcohol gains with the maturation of society.

With a similar mechanism he describes that malnutrition contributes to an increased chance to develop insanity, which in his opinion could be evidenced by every underfed population. This would also apply to the British society at the time. Until the late 19th century, chronic hunger and malnutrition were the norm for the majority of the population of the world, including Britain. The life expectancy in Britain suffered immensely, in large part due to malnutrition. A usual worker of a factory usually did not exceed the age of 40. Partly the shortage of food can be explained by the fact that food supply in Great Britain was adversely affected by the Corn Laws (1815-1846). The Corn Laws, which imposed tariffs on imported grain, were enacted to keep prices high in order to benefit domestic producers. As additionally population grew exponentially in these years in urban areas, among others noticed by Thomas Maltus, not enough food could be provided and money was scarce among the lower ranks of society. All these factors increased poverty and malnutrition and may explain the high prevalence of insane people among the lower working classes of British Society. Not surprisingly, Tuke names pauperism to be one of the major influential factors causing insanity.

==== Dissolute Life, Depraved Habits and Disappointments in Love ====
Tuke was among the first scientists to recognize that emotional problems and general life satisfaction highly influence the mental health of a person, disregarding his societal rank. During the Industrial Revolution steadily rising standards caused changes in the mindset of society. An increased incidence of emotional conflict was the result of the competitive spirit of the modern civilization. When people compared their living standards, they often became dissatisfied with their own and luxury goods grew in importance. Tuke explains, that this kind of depression interferes with normal cognitive functioning and additionally, often leads to the consume of drugs and thus indirectly precipitates insanity.

==== Overwork ====
Another consequence of the industrial revolution in the 18th century was the increased number of hours per day that people belonging to the working class had to absolve with only little payment. As increasingly more factories were built, more workers were needed in total and a worker had to work on average more under terrible working conditions. Oftentimes, even children were used as workers in the factory to ensure the survival of the family. On average, children were paid less than 10 Cent for a fourteen-hours shift. However, also members from upper classes were confronted with an increased amount of work to maintain their business. According to Tuke, both, the mental and the physical exhaustion like business or monetary worries, lead to emotional stress which has similar effects on mental health as dissatisfaction with the own living circumstances.

==== Intellectual Strain ====
Intellectual strain in form of excesses of educational work, is also a potent cause Tuke introduces in his book. Similar to the physical overwork mentioned above, Tuke expects similar consequences for mental exhaustion. As with the industrial society also the external societal pressure rises, so did the urge for self-perfection and societal improvement. The pressure and overthinking in turn, is thought to cause sleeplessness which interferes with the proper formation of memories. Contrastingly, he underlines that the contrary, namely mental underload is also a dangerous factor considering the development of mental illnesses. He states that the upper classes of society are heading towards a style of living in which intellect is of minor importance as compared to luxuries and reputation. Less cognitive engagement would cause cognitive abilities to decline in the long-term and would also elevate mental tension.

==== Religious and political excitement ====
Political excitement is termed as one of the major influential factors that positively contribute to insanity. As society increases in size, opinions become more diversified. The traditionally and religiously shaped views become challenged, which according to Tuke interferes with the implementation of an ideal society. This would open room for insanity to arise and spread. Additionally, political and religious excitement is hypothesized to generally lead to emotional stress and upheaval which would disturb the mental equilibrium that is required in order to ensure mental health.

=== Prevalence of Insanity in the course of history ===
==== Insanity in Prehistoric times ====
As compared to a completely uncivilized tribe, Tuke states that more mature communities are increasingly exposed to unfavorable psychological influences. Excessive as well as deprived education, the increasing acceptance of drug consume, and the competitive spirit rising in the course of history are claimed to be among the major causes of insanity. He emphasizes that this is not the result of civilization itself, but that humans have never realized the ideal of a society and are probably never able to fully apply it. Living in a civil society in his view means to reclaim from barbarism, intemperance, dissipation and pauperism and to support and help each other. According to Tuke, the prevalence of insanity in prehistoric times was the lowest because people were living in uncultivated tribes and were not interested in modern education. Moreover, although intoxication is reported in early times, the mind-altering drugs that Native tribes used or still use, are mostly used for rituals and only rarely in private. Hereby, Tuke refers to old Indian tribes that use Marihuana in some of their ceremonies. Additionally, even the so-called savages did not behave intemperate even when intoxicated. Moreover, according to Tuke, prehistoric tribes did not suffer from religious and political perplexities nor commercial speculation. People may believe in evil spirits or ghosts but this mental imbalance is counteracted by the belief in charms. All in all, Tuke explains that savages in the past and present live an uncultivated but satisfied life with no pursue after perfection and luxury. In his view, this renders them almost invulnerable to mental disease. Nevertheless, he stresses throughout his book that society itself is something every human should pursue and a savage life also has his own drawbacks, but insanity not being among them.

==== Insanity among the Jews and Egypts ====
According to Tuke, as time passes, intoxication became increasingly important. He refers to a biblical story, in which Noah planted a vineyard together with Satan. The bible also evidences that intemperate behavior while intoxicated became more prevalent. Yet, for example alcohol was not yet the scourge of society which it is in his opinion among some nations today. In generally, Jews are even considered to be sober and Egypts to have only rare experiences with alcohol in the public and private domain.

Jews as well as Egypts are thought to live a simple but not savage life in accordance with nature and moral standards. As their lives are centered around food, they did not have experience scarcity. Tuke, explains that their agricultural lifestyle, prevented malnutrition and hunger even among the poor. As also the other risk factors do not apply to this period of time, Tuke explains this to be the reason for the himself found low prevalence of insane people at the time.

==== Insanity in relation to the working classes ====
In this chapter, he underlines with the statistics the immense increase of insanity in the last 20 years. He claims that 20 years ago, only one out of 577 was diagnosed to be insane, whereas this raised to 1 in 370. He is convinced, that alone these today's statistics yield enough ground to conclude that insanity is determined by the modern civilized society of industrialized Britain. Even totally diverse states of a nation lead to the same determination. He declares that he is aware, that this increasing number may be partially explained by more diagnoses in general as well as a rising awareness for mental illnesses. Nevertheless, he asserts that the statistics prove that this cannot solely be explained by these two factors and that when looking at history, clear signs exist that point towards factors that evolved with the maturation of society. However, he also observes a trend within the population at his time, in which it becomes obvious that most insane people are to be found in the pauper part of society. He attributes this to the absence of rational employment that seems to be present in the lower ranks of the community. Pauper people in his eyes, are victims of debasing habits, indulgence in vices, less literary and scientific pursuits and mental stagnation. The mentality of the lower classes seems to be coined by recklessness, drunkenness, poverty and misery which are all risk factors in developing mental illness. He terms this "uncivilized behavio[u]r in a civilized society". As moral and physical conditions are generally bad among the poor, the clear trend in prevalence seems obvious to him. Moreover, since the pauper population misses education and mental work, they often seek other ways for excitement mostly in a political manner. Their intense emotional disturbance, alternating between intense joy and disappointment, in combination with malnutrition and manifold miseries are clear factors that influence the mental health of a worker. He is aware that the dissatisfaction of life caused by the bad living and working conditions prove additionally counteractive to mental health and facilitate the intake of stimulants and the development of intemperate habits which only further exacerbate their misery. As also children and women are employed in the factories, no time can be provided to adequately teach and raise the children to ensure a healthy cerebral development to prevent insanity in following generations.

He concludes that among the working class almost every influential factor that he mentions in the first chapter on the causes of insanity, especially apply to the working class. Member of this societal class are generally poor, underfed, oftentimes intoxicated, dissatisfied and disappointed and generally neither in physical nor in mental balance. He infers that by the maturation of society the gap enlarges and thus simultaneously gives rise to even more insanity.

==== Insanity among the upper classes ====
Although the prevalence of insanity seems to be rather absent in the upper classes of society, the statistics also identified a few cases of insanity among the rich. Tuke explains this by some of the prior mentioned factors that also apply to this rank of society. Admittedly, the prosperous people do not face physical overwork in the factories, but oftentimes severe mental work. He argues that the mental exhaustion caused by the maintenance of the business in many cases leads to mental fatigue and sleeplessness, which both interfere with proper memory formation. Business worry and money troubles lead to anxiety which disturbs the emotional and cognitive balance and thus concurs to the development of insanity. Additionally, the upper especially intellectual classes are confronted with immense societal pressure to perform at their best, further increasing anxiety. On the other hand, other parts of the higher classes are undereducated and their daily livings circle around the possession of luxury goods and to fulfil beauty standards. Another immensely critical factors lies in the enormous use of stimulants, especially alcohol, which is a daily practice in upper sections of the population. Alcohol is part of each meal and drunken because of boredom and reputation. This mindset is toxic in Tuke's eyes and more importantly degenerates cerebral structures.

=== Prevention of Insanity ===
Although Tuke is already aware that insanity is also partially favored by a specific combination of genetic material and thus predetermined, in the last chapters he designates some characteristics and habits which can avoid insanity and terms this "auto-prophylaxes". He emphasizes that in general a mentally as well as physically balances life is of great importance to ensure mental health. This can reached by enough sleep, physical and mental exercise and a generally healthy lifestyle. He further stresses to distance oneself from any type of intoxication as it interferes with the regular cognitive functioning and also harms the cerebral cortex.

Next to the general physical conditions, he also points to the importance of a morally acceptable way of living by avoiding political and religious fanaticism and mysticism, "Mental safety will be greatly increased by pursuing that middle course between them with an honest appreciation of the laws of emotions". He underlines the importance of cheerfulness and to decrease the importance of luxury goods and reputation to ensure the health of the nervous system. Children should be adequately thought and formed according to religious moral norms and provided with knowledge, to assure a healthy cerebral development. As society decreases social pressure and diminished the gap between the rich and the poor, there is hope for the future to prevent the unfavorable trend civilization is heading to.

== Reactions to his work ==
Despite his large contribution to today's knowledge about and theses on the sociocultural causes of mental illnesses, Tuke renders largely unknown after his death. This may be partially explained by the fact that he acknowledged himself only as a compiler of information rather than an innovator. However, he remains a major figure in British psychiatry in the late 19th century. During his lifetime he was a well-known scientist and psychiatrist whose work received much attention within the medical and psychiatric ranks. His contemporaries often regarded him as a "scientific sponge", gathering already existing knowledge about mental illnesses and aligning the findings with his social and societal observations. He was widely appreciated by taking controversial standpoints, even if they do not entirely match current scientific opinions and literature. During his visits of several asylums in 1853, he even raised international attention for his scientific and statistic work about the prevalence of mental disorders and the causes. As a consequence of his rich experiences abroad, Tuke was soon seen as an international expert on mental illness and was lecturing at York Medical School. 5 years later, in collaboration with John Charles Bucknill, he published the Manual of Psychological Medicine which served as a standard work for lunacy for years. As the joint editor of the Journal of Mental Science starting in 1880, he continues to be regarded as one of the most influential scientists from 19th century British psychiatry. Although he often focused on novel and rather uncommon phenomena, he was largely accepted and appreciated by leading British psychiatrists, neurologists and psychologists, including Jean-Marie Charcot, Hippolyte Bernheim and Victor Horsley with which he worked on the Dictionary of Psychological medicine.

His widespread and even international recognition positively contributed the way with which his work was received. His books, including the Insanity in Ancient and Modern life, are often cited and referred to in scientific literature about sociocultural causes and influential factors contributing to insanity in the past and present. Additionally, he is often minorly mentioned in historical books about the emergence of psychology as a discipline. Tuke was among the first persons to recognize an increase in the prevalence of insanity by making use of statistics to identify possible causes, which he clarifies in great detail in Insanity in Ancient and Modern Life. As many of his other books, the book was used as a psychiatric workbook for classes on mental illness.

== Other publications ==
Tuke's other medical books focused on the topic of insanity and mental illnesses, its causes, and resulting implications for treatment. During his time when he conducted a new course on psychological medicine at York Medical School, he also published several case studies and notes on psychopathological patients.[In 1872 he wrote what is counted as one of his more influential books Illustrations of the Influence of the Mind Upon the Body in Health and Disease. In 1874, together with John Charles Bucknill, he published the Manual of Psychological Medicine, in which they discuss the classification, causes, and the different forms of insanity. In 1880, he became a joint editor of the Journal of Mental Sciences.

The book Insanity in Ancient and Modern Life (1878), followed by The History of the Insane in the British Isles (1882) count as some of his most influential works. In 1884, during his visit in America, he also collected material for his book The Insane in the United States and Canada. In all this works he reflects on the culturally and societal conditions people find themselves in and relates this to causes and prevalence of insanity between different nations. Together with The Insanity in Ancient and Modern Life, the medical book The Past and Present Provision for the Insane Poor in Yorkshire considers the differences in prevalence among upper and lower social classes.

Finally, he became an editor of the Dictionary of Psychological Medicine, being the most cherished psychiatric work of the 19th century. Among an international group consisting of 128 authors, Tuke analyses and discusses in 68 sections many of the complex social, cognitive and professional dimensions of nineteen century's psychiatry.
