= Tukey (disambiguation) =

John Tukey (1915–2000) was an American mathematician.

Tukey may also refer to:

- Francis Tukey (1814–1867), American politician
- Tukey Island, one of the Joubin Islands, Antarctica
- Tukey's Bridge, Portland, Maine
- Tukey's test (disambiguation)

== See also ==
- Tuke (disambiguation)
- Turkey (disambiguation)
