= Margaret Tuke =

British academic and educator (1862–1947)

DBE Margaret Janson Tuke
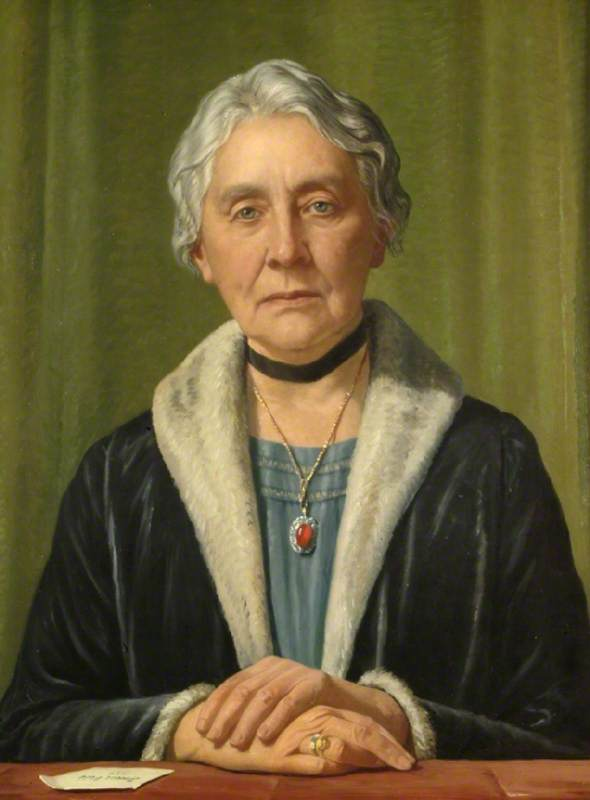
- Margaret Tuke by Francis Dodd
- Born: 13 March 1862; Hitchin, England
- Died: 21 February 1947 (aged 84); Hitchin
- Occupation(s): academic and educator

Dame Margaret Janson Tuke DBE (13 March 1862, Hitchin, Hertfordshire, England – 21 February 1947, Hitchin) was a British academic and educator. She was the youngest child of the philanthropist James Hack Tuke. She was created a Dame Commander of the Order of the British Empire in 1932.

== Education ==
Tuke was educated at home until she was 15, then for two years at St John's School in Withdean, now part of Brighton. She also went to Bedford College in London one day a week in Michaelmas term 1879.

In 1885, she became one of the first women to go up to Cambridge University, where she read Modern and Medieval Languages at Newnham, gaining the equivalent of a first class honours degree in 1888. As women were not awarded degrees by Cambridge at the time, her BA and MA were conferred upon her by Trinity College, Dublin in 1905. (Women could only receive Cambridge degrees after 1948.)

== Career ==
Tuke began her academic career at Newnham College and taught French there, as a staff lecturer in modern languages, from 1890 to 1905. She then moved to University College, Bristol, to take up the position of tutor to the women students and a lectureship in French. She remained a Fellow of Newnham from 1905 until 1936.

Tuke became Principal of Bedford College in 1907 and remained in the post until her retirement in 1929. During her time there she oversaw its move from Baker Street, London, to a site at Regent's Park, after which the number of students doubled. While overseeing the expansion of the academic provisions at the college, she also served as the representative of the Faculty of Arts on the University of London Senate from 1911 until her retirement. Additionally, she served on numerous academic committees, including the University Scholarships Committee and the Academic Council (1911–1929).

In September 1937 Dame Margaret presented the Library of Royal Holloway, University of London with a collection of Italian Renaissance letters dating from 1526 to 1697. They deal principally with the family and business affairs of the Florentine Ridolfi family. The Tuke manuscript collection enhanced the research potential of existing works of Italian literature ranging from the 16th to 20th century, of which Giovanni Battista Guarini's Poetical Works (1630) and Gian Giorgio Trissino's La Sophonisba (1530) are examples in the collection.

== Personal life ==
Margaret Tuke's best friend in childhood and adolescence was Winnie Seebohm, who lived close by with her family. The two girls applied to higher education institutions clandestinely, to avoid criticism from their fathers and extended family. They were both accepted into Newnham college, however, Winnie had to discontinue shortly into the first term due to ill health. The death of Winnie at the age of 21 from asthma is said to have deeply affected Meta. Descriptions of their friendship and letters exchanged between the two are included in 'A Suppressed Cry- The Life of a Victorian Daughter', the biography of Seebohm authored by her great-grandniece, Victoria Glendinning.

Tuke shared interweaving, intimate relationships with other female writers. She annually shared a rented summer home with Caroline Spurgeon, Virginia Gildersleeve and others. She was known by the nickname of "Meta".

== Legacy ==
In 1949, Bedford College established the Dame Margaret Tuke Travel Bursary to commemorate the life and work of Dame Margaret Tuke. This is still awarded bi-annually.

Royal Holloway (merged with Bedford College in 1985) named one of its student accommodation buildings after Tuke.

== Bibliography ==
- "Women students in the universities" (Contemporary Review, 1928, 71–77)
- A History of Bedford College for women 1849-1937 (Oxford University Press, 1939)

== See also ==
- Tuke family

Academic offices
Preceded by Ethel Hurlbatt	Principal of Bedford College; University of London; 1907–1929	Succeeded by Geraldine Emma May Jebb
