= John Thomson (banker) =

Sir John Thomson KBE TD (3 April 1908 – 2 January 1998) was an English banker. He was the chairman of Barclays Bank from 1962 to 1973.

== Early life and career ==
John Thomson was born on 3 April 1908. He was educated at Winchester College, and earned a degree in law at Magdalen College, Oxford.

During World War II, he served as an officer in the Royal Artillery and commanded the Oxfordshire Yeomanry with the rank of lieutenant colonel. After the war, he joined Barclays Bank in 1947 and became its chairman from 1962 to 1973. He was knighted KBE in the 1972 New Year Honours. Thomson was also Lord Lieutenant of Oxfordshire from 1963 to 1979; and a steward (director) of the Jockey Club from 1974 to 1977.

== Death ==
Thomson died on 2 January 1998.

Business positions
Preceded by Anthony Tuke	Chairman of Barclays; 1962–1973	Succeeded by Sir Anthony Tuke
