= Took =

Took is a variant of the English surname Tooke, originally found predominantly in the East Anglia region of the United Kingdom.

The name Took may refer to:

== People ==
- Barry Took (1928–2002), British comedian and television presenter
- Steve Peregrin Took (1949–1980), British musician and songwriter
- Took Leng How (1981–2006), Malaysian murderer
- Roger Took, British art historian and sex offender

== Fiction ==
- Peregrin Took, fictional character in The Lord of the Rings by J.R.R. Tolkien

== See also ==
- Tooke
- Toon (name)
- Tuke (disambiguation)
- Tuque
