= W. F. Tuke =

English banker (1863–1940)

William Favill Tuke (15 August 1863 – 18 April 1940) was an English banker. He was chairman of Barclays Bank from 1934 to 1936.

== Early life ==
He was the son of William Murray Tuke (1822–1903), who had a "substantial tea business in York". He was descended from the Quaker tea merchant and philanthropist William Tuke (1732–1822). He was educated at the former Oliver's Mount School, Scarborough.

== Career ==
W. F. Tuke was chairman of Barclays from 1934 to 1936.

== Personal life ==
His son Anthony Tuke (1897–1975) was chairman of Barclays from 1951 to 1962. His grandson Sir Anthony Favill Tuke (1920–2001) was chairman of Barclays from 1973 to 1981.
