= Daniel Hack Tuke =

English doctor (1827–1895)

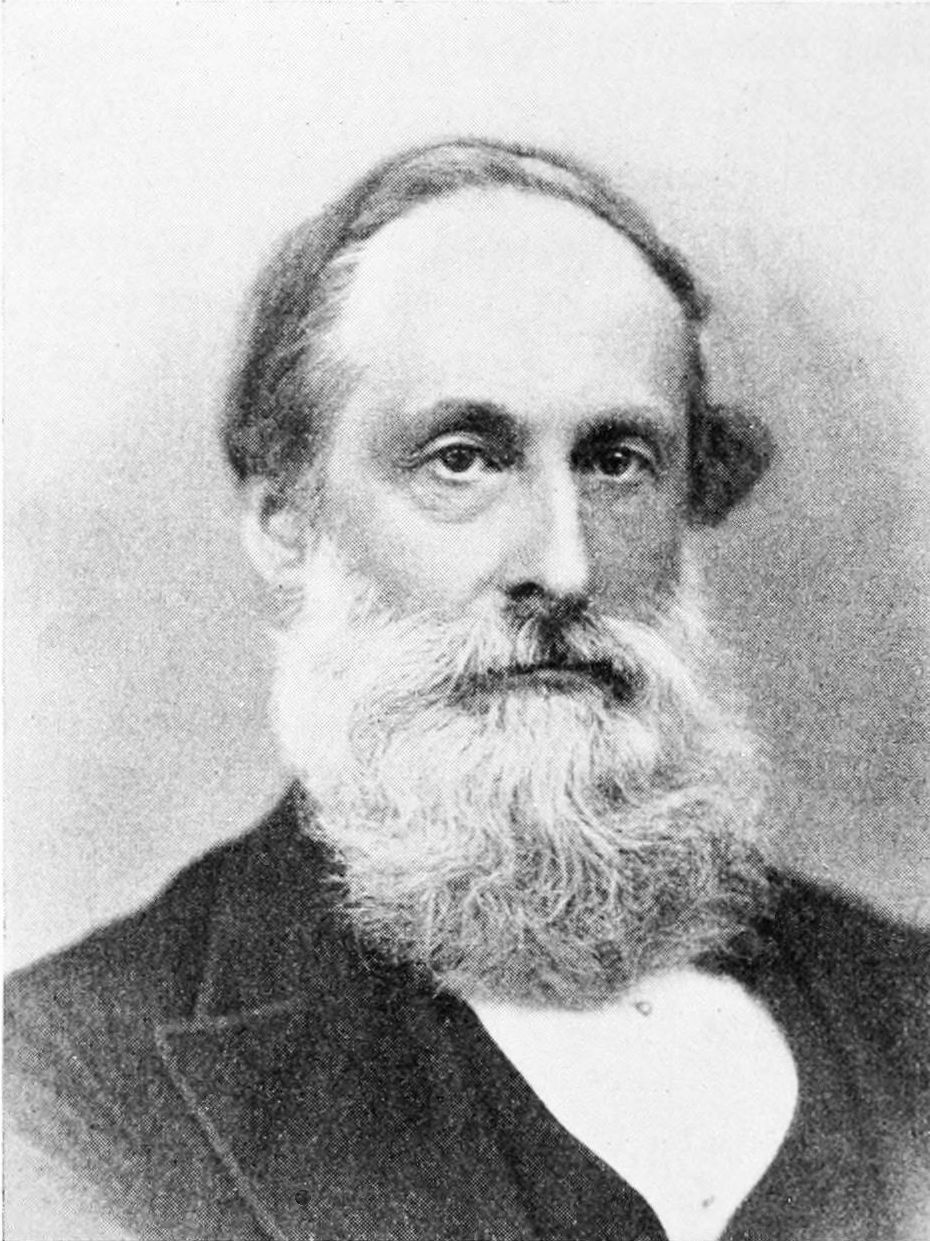
Daniel Hack Tuke

Daniel Hack Tuke (19 April 1827 – 5 March 1895) was an English physician and expert on mental illness.

== Family ==
Tuke came from a long line of Quakers from York who were interested in mental illness and concerned with those afflicted. His great-grandfather William Tuke and his grandfather Henry Tuke co-founded the Retreat, which revolutionized the treatment of insane people.

His father Samuel Tuke carried on the work of the York Retreat and reported on its methods and its results. Daniel's older brother James Hack Tuke (1819–1896) was the next overseer of the York Retreat. Daniel was the youngest son of Samuel Tuke and Priscilla Hack, his wife.

Tuke's son was the painter Henry Scott Tuke.

== Career ==
In 1845 Daniel Tuke entered the office of a solicitor at Bradford, but in 1847 began work at the York Retreat. Entering St Bartholomew's Hospital in London in 1850, he became a member of the Royal College of Surgeons in 1852, and graduated M.D. at Heidelberg in 1853.

In 1853 he visited a number of foreign asylums, and later returning to York he became visiting physician to the York Retreat and the York Dispensary, lecturing also to the York School of Medicine on mental diseases.

In 1859 ill health obliged him to give up his work, and for the next fourteen years he lived at Falmouth. In 1875, he settled in London as a specialist in mental diseases.

In 1858, in collaboration with John Charles Bucknill, he published a Manual of Psychological Medicine, which was for many years regarded as a standard work on lunacy. In 1872 he published his most influential and popular book On the Influence of the Mind upon the Body in Health and Disease. In 1880 he became joint editor of the Journal of Mental Science. In 1892 – in cooperation with many others as contributors, including the French neurologist Jean-Martin Charcot – he edited a Dictionary of Psychological Medicine in 2 volumes.

== Marriage ==
In 1853 he married Esther Maria Stickney (1826–1917). They had three children, the second son being Henry Scott Tuke RA (1858–1929).

== Death ==
He died on 5 March 1895 and was buried at the Quaker Burial Ground, Saffron Walden.

== Publications ==
- Prize Essay on the Progressive Changes which have taken place since the time of Pinel in the Moral Management of the Insane, London 1854
- Report of the Meerenberg asylum for 1852-3. The Asylum Journal of Mental Science, 1, 1855 (No. 9, November 15, 1854), 141-143
- On the Advantages likely to result from Cerebro-Mental Investigations, especially by the Agency of Societies. The Asylum Journal of Mental Science, 2, 1856, 341-354
- On the various Forms of Mental Disorder, (Being the substance of Lectures delivered at the York School of Medicine). The Asylum Journal of Mental Science, 2, 1856, 445-466; 3, 1857, 81-113, 218-246, 335-364, 443-464
- A Manual of Psychological Medicine, Philadelphia 1858 (fourth edition: London 1879)
- On the Canon of the New Testament, Bristol 1860 (Lithographed)
- Insanity among Women. The English Woman's Journal, 7 (No. 39, May 1, 1861), 145-157
- The plea of insanity in relation to the penalty of death. The Social Science Review, Sanitary Review, and Journal of the Sciences, 28 (April 2, 1866), 289-309
- Illustrations of the Influence of the Mind upon the Body in Health and Disease, London 1872 [the second edition was translated into German by Hermann Kornfeld: Geist und Körper. Studien über die Wirkung der Einbildungskraft, Jena 1888]
- Insanity in Ancient and Modern Life, London 1878
- Historical Sketch of the Association, in: G. F. Blandford, General Index to the First Twenty-Four Volumes of The Journal of Mental Science, London 1879, iii-viii
- Broadmoor, l'asile d'état pour les aliénés criminels d'Angleterre, in: Congrès International de Médecine Mentale, tenu à Paris du 5 au 10 août 1878, Paris 1880, 35-40
- De la meilleure manière d'établir la statistique des causes de l'aliénation mentale, in: Congrès International de Médecine Mentale, tenu à Paris du 5 au 10 août 1878, Paris 1880, 88-92
- "The Cagots". The Journal of the Anthropological Institute of Great Britain and Ireland. 9. Wiley: 376–385. 1880. doi:10.2307/2841703. JSTOR 2841703., article on the Cagots
- Mental Stupor, in: International Medical Congress. Abstracts, London 1881, 442-444
- Chapters in the History of the Insane in the British Isles, London 1882 [with Tuke's presidential address "Progress of psychological medicine during the last forty years: 1841-1881"]
- L'hypnotisme spécialement sous le rapport de l'état mental. Bulletin de la Société de médecine mentale de Belgique, 28, 1883, 72-105
- Sleep-Walking and Hypnotism, London 1884
- The public asylums of the provence of Quebec. Canada Medical & Surgical Journal, 13, 1885, 129-143
- Questionnaire pour faciliter les rec herchessur [sic!] le somnambulisme. Psychiatrische Bladen, 3, 1885, 249-250
- The Insane in the United States and Canada, London 1885
- Une enquête sur le somnambulisme naturel. Revue de l'hypnotisme expérimental & thérapeutique, 1, 1886, 57-60
- On the various modes of providing for the insane and idiots in the United States and Great Britain, in: Transactions of the International Medical Congress, Vol. 5, Washington 1887, 238-253
- Folie à deux. Brain: A Journal of Neurology, 10, 1888, 408-421
- Hallucinations, and the subjective sensations of the sane. Brain: A Journal of Neurology, 11, 1889, 441-467
- Provision for the insane poor in Yorkshire. The American Journal of Insanity, 46, 1889, 281-282
- Prichard and Symonds in Especial Relation to Mental Science with Chapters on Moral Insanity, London 1891
- A Dictionary of Psychological Medicine, Philadelphia 1892 [entries written by Tuke are listed on p. 1474]
- Reform in the treatment of the insane, in: G. A. Blumer & A. B. Richardson (eds.), Commitment, Detention, Care and Treatment of the Insane, Baltimore 1894, 66-68

Numerous articles in The Journal of Psychological Medicine and The Journal of Mental Science.
