= Tuke baronets =

Extinct baronetcy in the Baronetage of England

The Tuke Baronetcy, of Cressing Temple in the County of Essex, was a title in the Baronetage of England. It was created on 31 March 1664 for the Royalist army officer and playwright Samuel Tuke. The title became extinct on the death of the second Baronet in 1690.

== Tuke baronets, of Cressing Temple (1664) ==
Escutcheon of the Tuke baronets of Cressing Temple

- Sir Samuel Tuke, 1st Baronet (c. 1615–1674)
- Sir Charles Tuke, 2nd Baronet (1671–1690)
