= Tooke =

Tooke is an Old English name originally found predominantly in the East Anglia region of the United Kingdom.Tooke is said to be derived "from the Old Swedish (pre 7th century Old Scandinavian origin) personal name "Toki". Toki remained a personal name from the Old Scandinavian, through the Anglo-Norman, and Middle English periods.

== Etymology ==
Tooke is said to be derived from the Old Swedish (pre 7th century Old Scandinavian origin) personal name "Toki", itself claimed to be short form (in Latin a diminutive or in Greek a hypocoristicon) of "Thorkettill" translating as "Thors cauldron". However, some sources suggest the derivation is from "Tiodgeir", meaning "people-spear". Toki remained a personal name from the Old Scandinavian, through the Anglo-Norman, and Middle English periods.

Two runestone inscriptions contain the personal name Toki: the Gunderup Runestone and the Sjörup Runestone. The personal name Thorkell is mentioned in two sagas: Hrafnkel's Saga and the Laxdale Saga.

"Thorkettill" translating as "Thors cauldron" is a reference to the Norse myth that thunder was made by Thor riding around in a chariot full of kettles.

According to Helene Adeline Guerber, "in Southern Germany the people, fancying a brazen chariot alone inadequate to furnish all the noise they heard, declared it was loaded with copper kettles, which rattled and clashed, and therefore often called him, with disrespectful familiarity, the kettle-vendor."

Also in the Norse sagas, there is a story in which Thor is looking for a "kettle large enough to brew ale for all the Æsir at one time."

== Distribution ==
The Old-Swedish source of Tooke seems to be confirmed by its distribution in England. Tooke is overwhelmingly prevalent in Norfolk, then Suffolk; areas that were part of the Viking Danelaw. References to Thor hit a "high popularity during the Viking Age". Compared with their Anglo-Saxon neighbours, the Vikings favoured Thor instead of Woden. Also, Tooke is derived from "Old Swedish" (pre-7th-century Old Scandinavian origin) rather than the related "Old English".

Tuck is far less localized; its largest concentration is also in Norfolk, but it is found throughout England. It is also a far more common surname than Tooke.

There are few records in the Norman period of English history. However, the Domesday Book of 1086 was a survey of the land and land ownership before and after the Norman conquest. In the database provided by PASE Domesday, there are twenty-three people of the name Toki and its variants. These are only men who held land, which was only a small segment of the population.

== History ==
=== Tuck and Tooke, of East Anglia: Norfolk, and Suffolk ===
The Tookes from Norwich appear to associate themselves (using their arms) with the landed Toke family of Godinton Kent, which claims descent from Robert de Toke, who was present with Henry III at the Battle of Northampton (1264).

Most Norfolk Tookes would be of local origin. Dr. Robert Liddiard in his thesis Landscapes of Lordship: Norman Castles and the Countryside in Medieval Norfolk, 1066-1200 suggests there were "a maximum of five and a minimum of three individuals called Toki who held land in Norfolk on the eve of the [Norman] conquest".

One Toki (in particular) was a rather prominent ancestor of William de Warenne. "Toki was one of England's wealthiest lords, ranking fortieth in terms of wealth as recorded in Domesday Book TRE." Toki and his family lost their position after the fall of the Anglo-Saxons at the Battle of Hastings.

Lords and Communities in Early Medieval East Anglia describes that he was a King's Thane A Thane was "a rank of nobility in pre-Norman England, roughly equivalent to baron." "The thanes in England were formerly persons of some dignity; there were two orders, the king's thanes, who attended the kings in their courts and held lands immediately of them, and the ordinary thanes, who were lords of manors and who had particular jurisdiction within their limits. After the [Norman] Conquest, this title was disused, and baron took its place."

==== Toka of Norfolk ====
The Ketts of Norfolk, a yeoman family suggests that the Ketts are descended from a Toka/i "francigena" and his family who held numerous lordships of the manor in Norfolk in the reign of Edward the Confessor, as mentioned above.

==== More on Toka: Deep ancestral history ====
"The Danish origin of the Ketts is indicated in the name of Godwin, and the pedigree goes back to him. Having regard to the date 1225, it would make 1140 a probable date for Godwin's birth. It seems unlikely that any documentary evidence now exists that will prove an earlier generation. We have Domesday compiled in 1086. From the scarcity of surnames in that record, no clear reference to the Ketts of East Anglia is forthcoming, but Christian names similar to those of the earliest recorded members of the Kett family have been found. They have been abstracted from the Norfolk Domesday and closely analysed. It is worth noting that the association of one group of Godwins, Hughs, and Huberts indicates a probable derivation from Toka, a " francigena " or foreigner (another word is used for Frank or Frenchman). This Toka was born about 960 A.D. These men were tenants of the de Morleys and the previous holders of de Morley lands. The following pedigree is appended, for what it is worth, as being reasonably probable..."

Toka "francigena" Born about 960

Godwin Tokesone (Godwine son of Toki) Born about 1000; held land at Wooton, county Norfolk (246 b.), under Gert, from the King, brother of Harold, 1042–1060; aka called the "Other Godwin"; Domeday, fo. 33 b., " son of Toka," Suffolk.

Godwin Godwine Born about 1030; held land at "Wooton under Godwin Tokesone, and in Panxford and Plumstead, county Norfolk, under Gert, 1042–1066.

Godwin, a freeman, of Panxford and Godwine of Plumstead,

Hugh Born about 1060; succeeded to Godwin's land in Panxford and Plumstead, which he held in 10S6. Hugh also then held land in Morley and Aslactou.

Hugh Born about 1100. Father of Godwin. (Early Norfolk Fine.)

Godwin Born about 1140. Son of Hugh. Held land in Wilchingham, county Norfolk, 1202. ? Godwin Ket, father of Hubert Kett of Morley, about 1200. (Early Norfolk Fine.)

Hubert Kett wife Katherine. Chartulary, "Wymondham Abbey. Born about 1170; of Morley, 1200. His services were granted to Wymondham Abbey, 1200, by Eobert de Morley.

Hugh Kett. Born about 1200. (See Pedigree A)

Source: The Ketts of Norfolk, a yeoman family & The Pedigree of Kett of Wymondham, Co. Norfolk, A.D. 1180-1913: Shewing the Ancestry, Kindred and Descendants of Robert, William and Thomas Kett, Leaders of the Rebellion in East Anglia, 1549, and of Francis Kett, the Martyr, Burnt at the Stake at Norwich Castle, 1589

== Notable Tookes ==
- Andrew Tooke (1673–1732), English scholar, headmaster, and translator of Tooke's Pantheon
- Charles Emery Tooke, Jr. (1912–1986), U.S. attorney and politician from Louisiana
- George Tooke (1595–1675), English soldier and writer
- John Horne Tooke (1736–1812), English clergyman, politician, and philologist
- John Tooke (born 1949), English professor of medicine and medical reform advocate
- Thomas Tooke (1774–1858), English economist and economic statistician, son of William Tooke (1744–1820), brother of William Tooke (1777–1863)
- William Tooke (1744–1820), British clergyman and historian of Russia, father of William Tooke (1777–1863) and Thomas Tooke
- William Tooke (1777–1863), British lawyer, son of William Tooke (1744–1820), brother of Thomas Tooke

== See also ==
- Took (surname)
- Tuke (disambiguation)
- Tuque
