= Maastricht University Special Collections =

Library in Maastricht, Netherlands

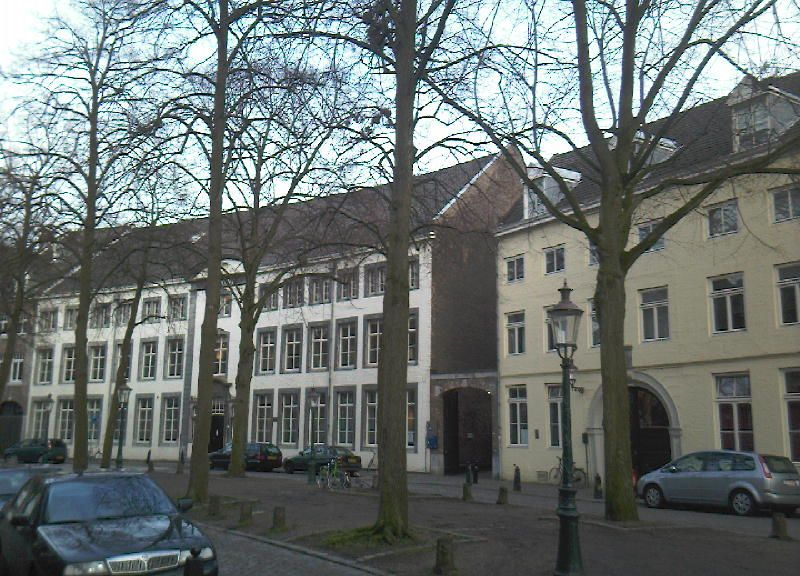
Maastricht University Inner City Library, Grote Looiersstraat 17

The Maastricht University Special Collections is the heritage library of Maastricht University. The collections are part of the closed stacks department of the University Library which is housed in Grote Looiersstraat 17, a historic building dating back to 1757.

The largest and most important special collection of Maastricht University is the Jesuit library which consist of more than 250,000 volumes of books with scientific, legal, as well as theological significance. Other notable items in the library's collections include prize books, travel books, and books printed in Maastricht.

Several collections are especially focused on Limburg notables such as the personal library of Limburg poet Pierre Kemp (1886–1967), the documentation collection by painter Charles Eyck (1897–1983), and the personal library of chemist and Nobel laureate Peter Debye (1884-1966). The library also holds the personal library of Dutch illustrator Bernhard Reith (1894-1974) and many Dutch periodicals from 1840 to 1950.

== History ==
In the course of the 1970s, many theological faculties were restructured or closed, including the Canisianum, a school for young priests in Maastricht. A number of these institutions had impressive library collections which were distributed after they closed down. In the beginning, the Jesuit library was to be relocated to a theological school in Amsterdam. However, it was sold to the newly established State University of Limburg (now Maastricht University). The university library later expanded their collection by purchasing books from other institutions such as the institutional library for missiology, arabica and religious sciences from Maastricht, Mariëndaal from Grave, the Berchmanianum from Nijmegen and the Groot-Seminarie from Warmond. The total books bought from these institutions amounted up to 250,000 volumes.

In the beginning it was thought that the Jesuit library consisted of only religious books. In 1982, Professor Spruit from Utrecht University clarified that since the Jesuits also studied topics other than religion, it is most likely that the books contained a vast amount of other topics other than religion. From 1983 until 1987, the books were assessed and catalogued. In 1992, a selection of damaged books were restored.

== Other acquisitions ==
=== Reith Library ===
The Maastricht University Library houses the personal library of Dutch illustrator [Bernard Reith] (1894-1974), an art and art history teacher of the Jesuit St. Ignatiuscollege in Amsterdam. Reith is known for his illustrations for Louis Couperus 'Psyche' published in 1927. The Reith library contains over one thousand illustrated, written and collected works about the art of illustration, art history and drawing. It was acquired by the library in 2005.

==== Golden Age Illustration Books ====
Reith's personal library contains more than sixty books illustrated by Golden Age illustrators, including artists such as Arthur Rackham, Edmund Dulac, Kay Nielsen, and Willy Pogany. The Golden Age of Illustration is a period of excellence in book and magazine illustration that occurred around the 1880s and ended around the 1920s. In Europe, artists were influenced by the Pre-Raphaelites and design oriented movements such as the Arts and Crafts Movement and Art Nouveau. American illustration during this period was influenced by the Brandywine Valley tradition as started by Howard Pyle. Factors that led to the golden age of illustration include: new printing techniques, cheap paper production, and better infrastructure. The Golden Age of Illustration came to an end in the 1930s when photography started to advance.

== Dutch Periodicals ==
=== Het Weekblad van het Regt (1839-1943) ===
One of the many Dutch Periodicals is ’Het Weekblad van het Regt’. It is a collection of legal affairs magazines which served as reference work for jurisprudence in the Netherlands. In 1884, the name of the journal changed to 'Het Weekblad van het Recht, rechtskundig news- en advertblad '.

‘Het Weekblad’ is not only an important source of legal history research, but also relevant to current legal practice. It also provides good insight into social and societal developments in the period 1839-1943. With financial support from the Academic Heritage Maastricht Fund, all 13,865 Weekblads have been digitized and made searchable.

== Use and Outreach ==
There is an annual Spoken Word evening carried out with Boekhandel Dominicanen during Museumnacht in Maastricht. The library also has collaborations with the Centre Céramique and the Regional Historical Centre to organise events that promote access and use of the Special Collections.

=== Education ===
==== Art and Medicine ====
The Maastricht University Library also organises the opening of the elective course on art and medicine. Under the title 'Does perception of art make you a better doctor?’, a different theme is drawn weekly from the triangle of art, medicine and the senses. The course consists of training, research, workshops, lectures and interviews. The University Library provides this block opening together with the Jan Van Eyck Academy and the Faculty of Health, Medicine and Life Sciences which includes activities such as lectures, guided tours and assignments about anatomical atlases in the Special Collections.

==== Style and Modernity ====
The University Library assisted with a university course called Style and Modernity. In this course on the history of Western art in the nineteenth and twentieth centuries, students explore concepts such as style, modernity, modernism and avant-garde based on books from the Special Collections.

=== Events and other activities ===
==== Maastricht Antiquarian Book & Print Fair ====
The annual Maastricht Antiquarian Book & Print Fair (MABP) is one of Europe's leading antiquarian book events, taking place during the opening weekend of The European Fine Art Fair (TEFAF). More than twenty-five prestigious booksellers will team up to present the most precious, most valuable, most interesting items from their collections such as rare first editions, incunables, antique maps, but also more recent special editions and other collectibles.

The Maastricht University library regularly collaborate with other institutions such as the Centre Céramique and the Regional Historic Centre Limburg to organise exhibitions of the books from the Special Collections at the MABP. Past exhibitions included the themes travel books, atlases and herbal books.

==== Spoken Word ====
Spoken word is an event that is held every year during Museumnacht Maastricht (Museum night Maastricht) since 2016. It is held in the Dominicanen Bookstore and organised by Maastricht University Library. Interested students have the chance to give theatrical performances using books from the Special Collections for inspiration. In 2018, since the theme of the Museumnacht was ‘Lucky/Unlucky’, the students were shown some books that touch on the topics of apocalypse, prophecy, and superstitions.

==== Two Girls in China ====
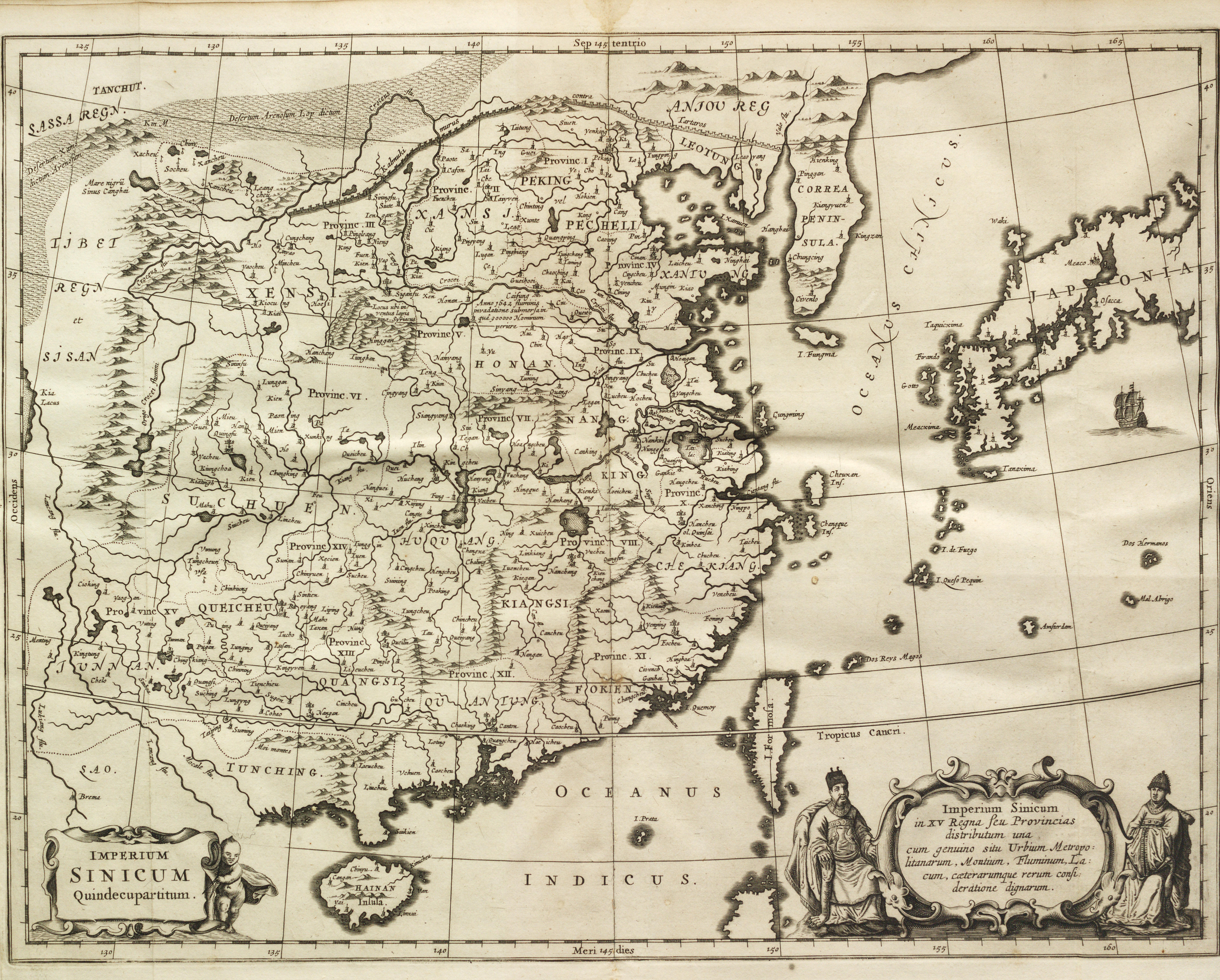
Map of China in Kircher's China Illustrata

In August 2016, two students from Maastricht University, Samantha Jenkins and Angelica Giombini, were sent to trace back the steps of the Dutch Jesuits travellers in China. The expedition is called Two Girls in China.

The Jesuits whose steps they followed were based on a map in Kircher's China Illustrata. Jenkins and Giombini retraced the routes followed by Albert Dorville and Johann Grueber who traveled together from Beijing, through Tibet and into India where Dorville died. Unfortunately, wandering into Tibet and India was not possible, and so the girl's journey had to end at the border of Tibet, near Larung Gar.

== Holdings ==
The Special Collections consists of numerous books in a plethora of topics, from religion to medicine and biology. Most of the books are either in Latin, French, Dutch, or German. Only a few of the books are in English or other languages. The following are highlighted books from the holdings:

=== Religion ===
The major library in the Special Collections is the Jesuit Library and a vast amount of religions books can be found in said library. Some of most notable in the collections are the 15th and 16th century books listed below:

- Gerson (1488). De immitatione christi et de contemptv mvndi in vvlgari sermone. Impressa a Venetia: Per Ioanne Rosso.
- Van Liesvelt (1534). Den bibel met grooter neersticheyt gecorrigeert, en̄ op die canten gheset den ouderdom der werelt, ende hoe lange die gheschiedenissen ende historien der bibelen elck int zijn voor christus gheboorte gheweest zijn, ende daer bivergadert wt fasciculus temporum, ende wt dye cronike vā alder werelt, die principael historiē der machtiger heydenscher conincrijckē, daer die heylige scrift oock dickwils af vermaent, tot een claerder verstant der bibelscher historien, ende oock een onderscheyt der tijden te hebben. Gheprent Thātwerpē ...: By mi Jacob van Liesuelt.
- Biblia sacra ad optima quæque veteris, & vulgate translationis exēplaria summa diligentia, pariq; fide castigata : Cum hebraicorum, chaldæorum & græcorum nominū interpretatione. (1567). Lvgdvni: Apvd Gvliel. Rovillivm.

=== Cartography ===
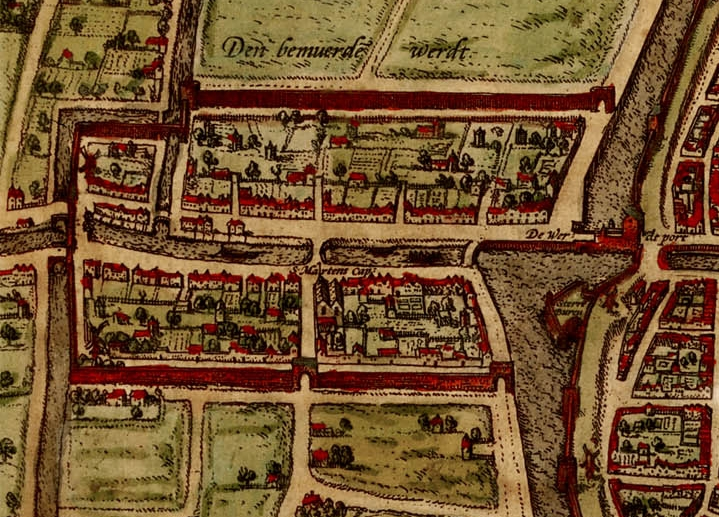
Braun's Civitates orbis terrarum: A suburb outside of the city of Utrecht, Netherlands.

The Jesuits travelled the world extensively in their missionary pursuits and often they would map their journey to these new places. When the University Library acquired the Jesuit library, they also acquired the maps and atlases that came with it. Highlighted maps and atlases include those from Braun and Mercator which focus on cities and countries, respectively:

- Braun & Hogenberg (1572). Civitates orbis terrarum. Coloniae Agrippinae: Apud Petrum a Brachel.
- Mercator (1628). Gerardi mercatoris atlas sive cosmographicæ meditationes de fabrica mvndi et fabricati figvra (Editio decima ed.). Amsterodami: Sumptibus & typis æneis Henrici Hondij.

=== Ethnography and Anthropology ===
As missionaries it was common for the Jesuits to settle down in a chosen area for a length of time to spread the word of Christ. In doing so, they would also record the lives of the locals. These records were then published and kept in their holdings. Thus, the Jesuit Library also contains ethnography and anthropology books that immortalised the lives and cultures of particular communities. These books were also used by students of the MaRBLe programme in their research thesis.

Highlights of ethnography and anthropology books include Kircher's book on China and a Dutch East-India Company's publication on the Old and New East-Indies:

- Kircher (1667). Athanasii kircheri e soc. jesu china monumentis qua sacris quà profanis, nec non variis naturæ & artis spectaculis, aliarumque rerum memorabilium argumentis illustrata, auspiciis leopoldi primi roman. imper. semper augusti munificentissimi mecænatis. Amstelodami,: Apud Joannem Janssonium à Waesberge & Elizeum Weyerstraet.
- Valentyn (1724). Oud en nieuw oost-indiën, vervattende een naaukeurige en uitvoerige verhandelinge van nederlands mogentheyd in die gewesten, benevens eene wydlustige beschryvinge der moluccos, amboina, banda, timor, en solor, java en alle de eylanden onder dezelve landbestieringen behoorende : Het nederlands comptoir op suratte, en de levens der groote mogols; als ook een keurlyke verhandeling van 't wezentlykste, dat men behoort te weten van choromandel, pegu, arracan, bengale, mocha, persien, malacca, sumatra, ceylon, malabar, celebes of macassar, china, japan, tayouan of formosa, tonkin, cambodia, siam, borneo, bali, kaap der goede hoop en van mauritius. Te Dordrecht: By Joannes van Braam.

=== Medicine ===
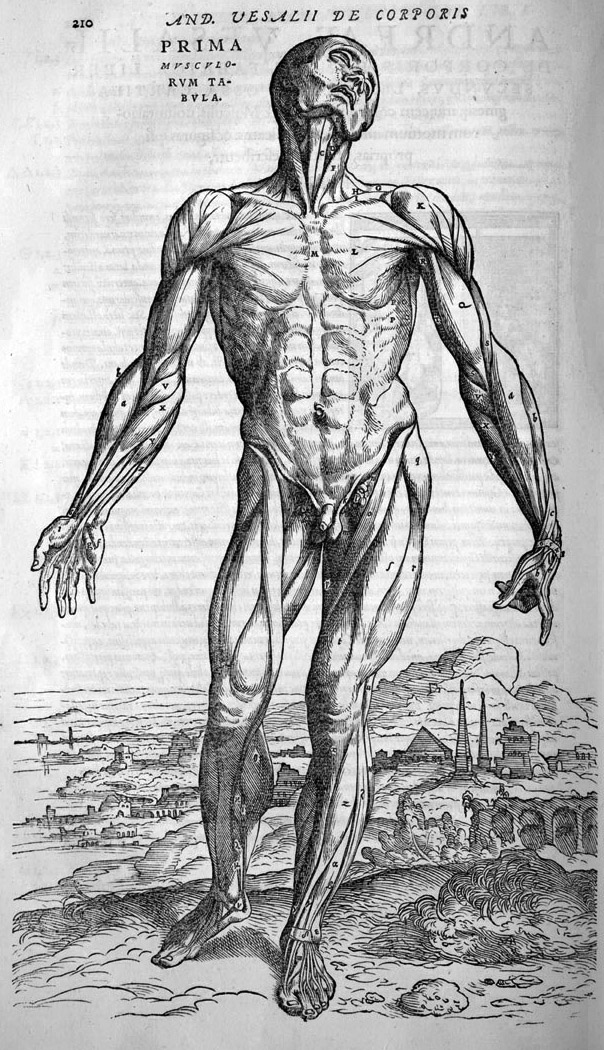
Vesalius' anatomy illustration

The University Library also holds books concerning early medical science which includes anatomy, psychology, surgery and many other branches of medical science. These books have been used in Maastricht University faculties and courses as an aid to their learning process. This includes programs and courses such as the Psychology Book Review and Arts and Medicine, and Style and Modernity.

The following books are examples of the many medicine books in the holdings. Both of them focus on surgery and dated as far back as the 17th century:

- Vesalius (1725). Andreae vesalii invictissimi caroli v. imperatoris medici opera omnia anatomica & chirurgica. Lugduni Batavorum: Apud Joannem du Vivie.
- Fabricius, & Nollens (1630). De chirvrgicale operatien. In s'Graven Haghe: By de weduwe, en erfgenamen van wylen Hillebrant Jacobsz. van Wouw.

=== Biology ===
The biology section is another important category within the Jesuit collections. This section consists of zoology, entomology, herbal books, taxonomy, and many others. The herbal books were exhibited in 2017 at the Centre Céramique, Natural History Museum and the Maastricht Antiquarian Books and Prints Fair.

The highlights showcase herbal books by early European botanists such as Dalechamps and Dodoens:

- Dalechamps & Des Moulins (1653). Histoire générale des plantes, contenant xviii livres egalement departis en devx tomes (Dernière edition, reveuë, corrigée ed.). A Lyon: Chez Philip. Borde, Laur. Arnaud, & Cl. Rigaud.
- Dodoens (1644). Crvydt-boeck remberti dodonæi, : Volghens sijne laetste verbeteringhe: Met biivoeghsels achter elck capitel, uyt verscheyden cruydt-beschrijvers: Item, in 't laetste een beschrijvinghe vande indiaensche ghewassen, meest ghetrocken uyt de schriften van carolvs clvsivs. nu wederom van nieuws oversien ende verbetert. T'Antwerpen,: Inde Plantijnsche druckerije van Balthasar Moretus.

== Friends of the Maastricht Academic Heritage Fund ==
Founded in 2012 the Friends of the Maastricht Academic Heritage Fund aims to draw more attention to the Special Collections at Maastricht University and to make this academic heritage available for education and research. Restoration of books is promoted by an Adopt-a-book program. Furthermore, it contributes to managing and acquiring the collections and provides access to them for a broad spectrum of interested public, both in the region and elsewhere. The Friends of the Maastricht Academic Heritage Fund is a named fund under the responsibility and management of the University Fund Limburg.

== Pierre Kemp Fund ==
Established on 1 December 2014 the Pierre Kemp Fund aims to preserve and expand Kemp's heritage. The Fund promotes his works and makes them accessible and available for everyone. Chair of the foundation board is poet and emeritus professor of General and Dutch Literature Wiel Kusters, who wrote a biography on Kemp in 2010. Other members of the board are Kemp-relative Wies Neuhof-Meijs and director of the University Library Maastricht Ingrid Wijk.

== Sources ==
- Artcyclopedia. (2015). Artists by Movement: The Golden Age of Illustration. http://www.artcyclopedia.com/history/golden-age.html
- Cobben, N., Gilbert, J., & Boonen, W. (1996). Uit de oude doos. in: Jägers, G., Klinkeberg, J., & Ruwe, M. de. (1996). Behouden en beheren, benutten en begeren. Maastricht: Universitaire Pers Maastricht.
- Ruwe, M. de. (1996). Onverwachte rijkdom: een inleiding. In: Jägers, G., Klinkeberg, J., & Ruwe, M. de. (1996). Behouden en beheren, benutten en begeren. Maastricht: Universitaire Pers Maastricht.
- Stijfs, J. (2005). Limburgs Boek Juweel. Maastricht: Stichting Historische Reeks Maastricht.
- The R. Atkinson Fox Society. (2012). What was the Golden Age of Illustration? http://www.rafoxsociety.com/what-was-the-golden-age-of-illustration/
