= Samuel Tuke (reformer) =

English mental-health reformer (1784–1857)

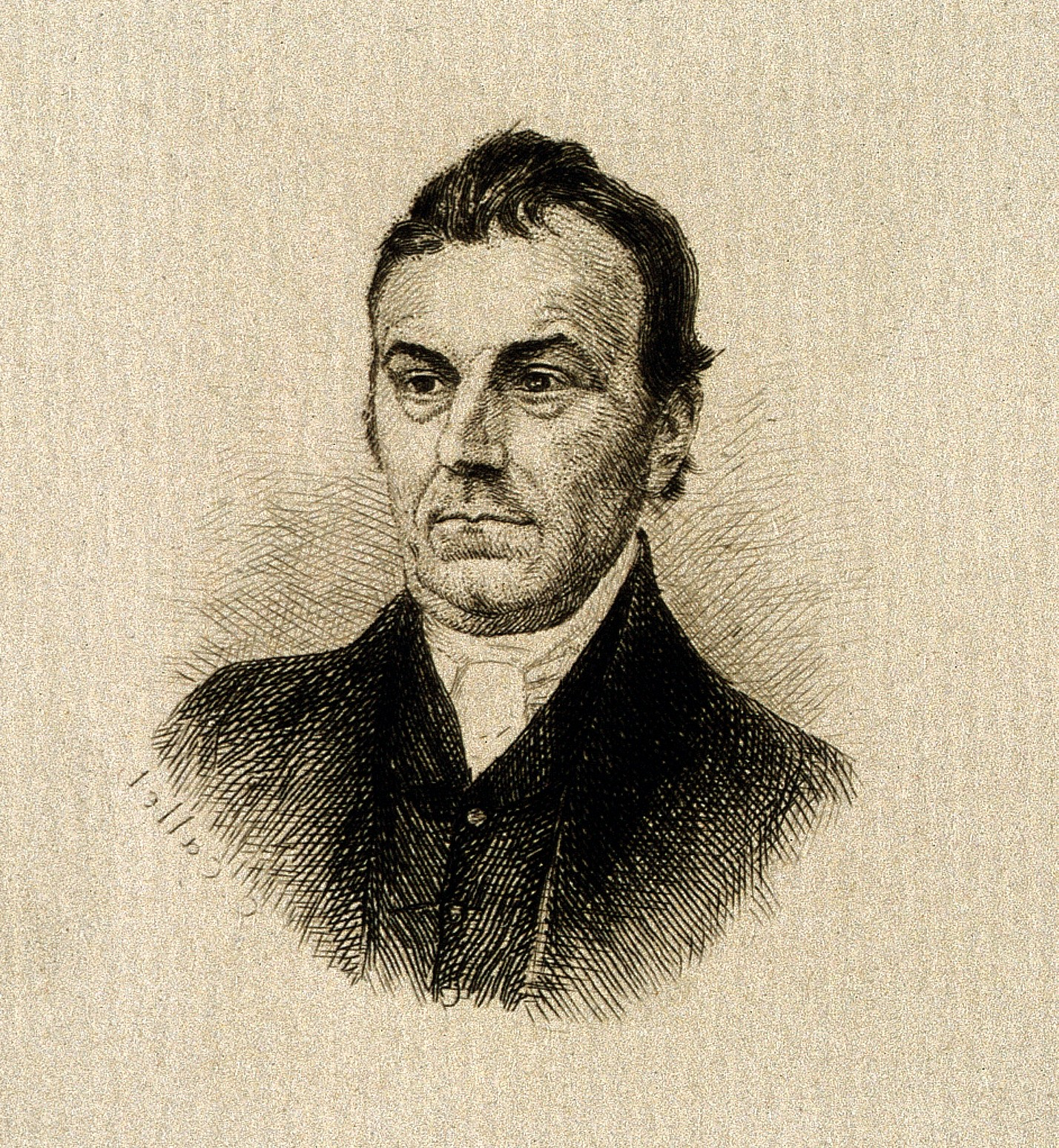
Samuel Tuke, etching by C. Callet (Wellcome Library, London)

Samuel Tuke (31 July 1784 – 14 October 1857) was a Quaker philanthropist and mental-health reformer. He was born in York, England.

== Early life ==
Samuel was part of a Quaker family. He was the son of Henry Tuke and the grandson of William Tuke, who founded the York Retreat.

== Career ==
He greatly advanced the cause of the amelioration of the condition of the insane, and devoted himself largely to the York Retreat. The methods of treatment pursued there were made more widely known by his Description of the Retreat near York. In this work Samuel Tuke referred to the Retreat's methods as moral treatment, borrowed from the French "traitement moral" being used to describe the work of Jean-Baptiste Pussin and Philippe Pinel in France (and in the original French referring more to morale in the sense of the emotions and self-esteem, rather than rights and wrongs).

Samuel Tuke also published Practical Hints on the Construction and Economy of Pauper Lunatic Asylums (1815).

== Personal life ==
He married Priscilla Hack, the daughter of James Hack of Chichester and Hannah Jeffreys. Their children were:

- James Hack Tuke (1819–1896), also active in humanitarian concerns
- Elizabeth Tuke (1821–1890), also active in humanitarian concerns, married William Stacey Gibson in 1845
- William Murray Tuke (1822–1903), tea merchant and banker
- Daniel Hack Tuke (1827–1895), also active in humanitarian concerns

== Legacy ==
The Retreat still provides mental healthcare for the population of York and the wider community. Samuel Tuke is buried in the Quaker cemetery within the hospital grounds. In August 2017 York Civic Trust commemorated him with a blue plaque.
