= Anthony Tuke (1920–2001) =

English banker (1920–2001)

Sir Anthony Favill Tuke (22 August 1920 – 6 March 2001) was chairman of Barclays Bank from 1973 to 1981 and Rio Tinto Zinc until 1985.

Anthony Tuke was the son of A. W. "Iron" Tuke, chairman of Barclays from 1951 to 1962, and the grandson of W. F. Tuke, who was chairman from 1934 to 1936.

Tuke was educated at Winchester and Magdalene College, Cambridge.

He was chairman of Barclays Bank from 1973 to 1981, when he was succeeded by Timothy Bevan.

He was chairman of RTZ until 1985, and was also deputy chairman of Royal Insurance from 1985 to 1992.

He served as President of the Marylebone Cricket Club in 1982.

Business positions
Preceded by Sir John Thomson	Chairman of Barclays; 1973–1981	Succeeded by Sir Timothy Bevan
