= Anthony Tuke (1897–1975) =

English banker (1897–1975)

Anthony William Tuke (24 February 1897 – 12 June 1975) was an English banker. He was the chairman of Barclays Bank from 1951 to 1962.

== Early life and family ==
Anthony Wiliam Tuke was born in 1897, the son of W. F. Tuke, who was chairman of Barclays from 1934 to 1936. He was educated at Winchester College. During World War I, he served with the Cameronians (Scottish Rifles). He joined Barclays after being demobilised in 1919.

His son Sir Anthony Favill Tuke (1920–2001) was chairman of Barclays from 1973 to 1981.

Business positions
Preceded by Sir William Goodenough, 1st Baronet	Chairman of Barclays; 1951–1962	Succeeded by Sir John Thomson
