= Henry Tuke =

English mental health reformer (1755–1814)

Henry Tuke (24 March 1755 – 11 August 1814) co-founded with his father, William Tuke, the Retreat asylum in York, England, a humane alternative to the nineteenth-century network of asyla, based on Quaker principles.

He was the author of several moral and theological treatises which have been translated into German and French.

He was a subscriber to the African Institution, the body which set out to create a viable, civilized refuge for freed slaves in Sierra Leone, Africa.

== Historic ship ==
The 1824 ship Henry Tuke, 365 tons, was built by Thatcher Magoun in Medford, MA, and owned by Daniel Pinckney Parker and John Chandler, Jr. It was a whaler in Warren, RI in 1846.

== See also ==
- Tuke family
