= William Murray Tuke =

British tea merchant and banker (1822–1903)

William Murray Tuke (1822–1903), was a British tea merchant and banker.

== Early life ==
William Murray Tuke was born in 1822, the son of Samuel Tuke and Priscilla Hack, the daughter of James Hack of Chichester, and his wife, Hannah Jeffreys.

== Career ==
Tuke was a tea merchant and a banker. He had a "substantial tea business in York". Tuke founded a bank in Essex, Gibson, Tuke & Gibson. Jabez Gibson, an uncle of the partner George Stacey Gibson, had been a founder of Saffron Walden Museum in 1835, and Tuke who lived at The Vineyard near Saffron Walden donated several objects to the museum.

== Personal life ==
He married Emma Williams (1822–1908) Their son William Favill Tuke (1863–1940) became a banker, serving as the Chairman of Barclays Bank from 1934 to 1936.

== Death ==
Tuke died in 1903.
