= James Hack Tuke =

British businessman and philanthropist (1819–1896)

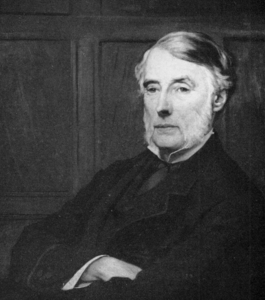
- Born: 13 September 1819; York, Yorkshire
- Died: 13 January 1896 (aged 76); Hitchin, Hertfordshire
- Occupation: businessman

James Hack Tuke (13 September 1819 – 13 January 1896) was an English philanthropist.

== Life ==
Born at York, England into a Quaker family, he was the son of Samuel Tuke and his wife Priscilla Hack; their seventh child, he had Daniel Hack Tuke as a brother. He was educated at the Religious Society of Friends school there, and after working for a time in his father's wholesale tea business, became in 1852 a partner in the banking firm of Sharples and Co., and went to live at Hitchin in Hertfordshire.

For eighteen years Tuke was treasurer of the Friends Foreign Mission Association, and for eight years chairman of the Friends Central Education Board. But he is mainly remembered for his philanthropic work in Ireland, after a visit to Connaught in 1847 where he witnessed scenes of great distress. In addition to relief, his eye-witness testimony brought further relief to the west of Ireland In 1880, accompanied by William Edward Forster, he spent two months in the West of Ireland distributing relief which had been privately subscribed by Friends (Quakers) in England.

Letters descriptive of the state of things he saw were published in The Times, and in his pamphlet, Irish Distress and its Remedies (1880), he pointed out that Irish distress was due to economic rather than political difficulties, and advocated state-aided land purchase, peasant proprietorship, light railways, government help for the fishing and local industries, and family emigration for the poorest peasants. From 1882 to 1884 he worked continuously in Ireland superintending the emigration of poor families to the United States and the British Empire.

The failure of the potato crop in Ireland in 1885 again called forth Tuke's energy; on the invitation of the government, and aided by public subscription, he purchased and distributed seed potatoes to avert a famine. His reports and letters to The Times, reprinted under the title The Condition of Donegal (1889), contributed to support for the bill passed for the construction of light railways in 1889 and the Irish Land Act which established the Congested Districts Board for Ireland in 1891.
