= William Tuke =

English mental health reformer (1732–1822)

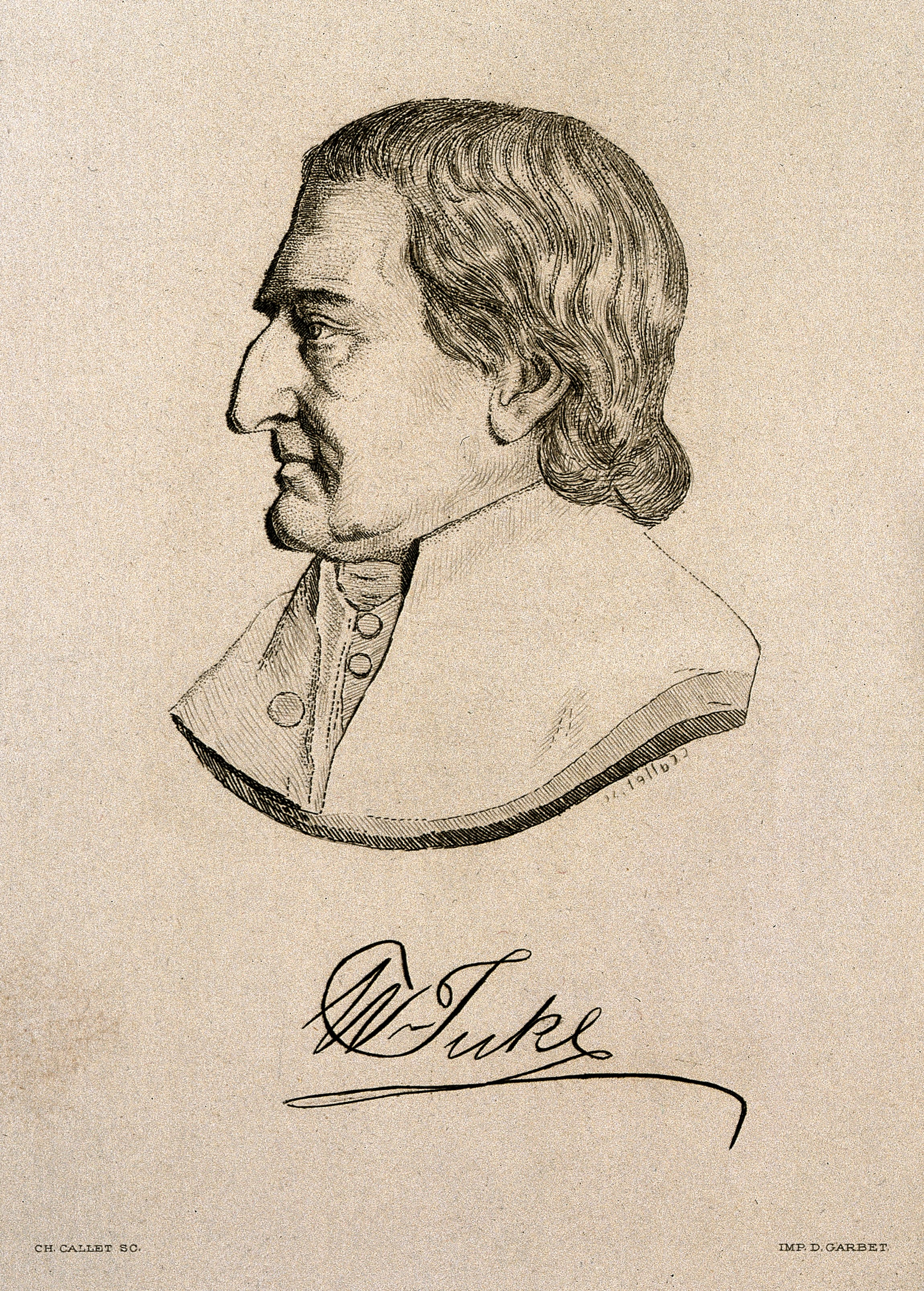
William Tuke

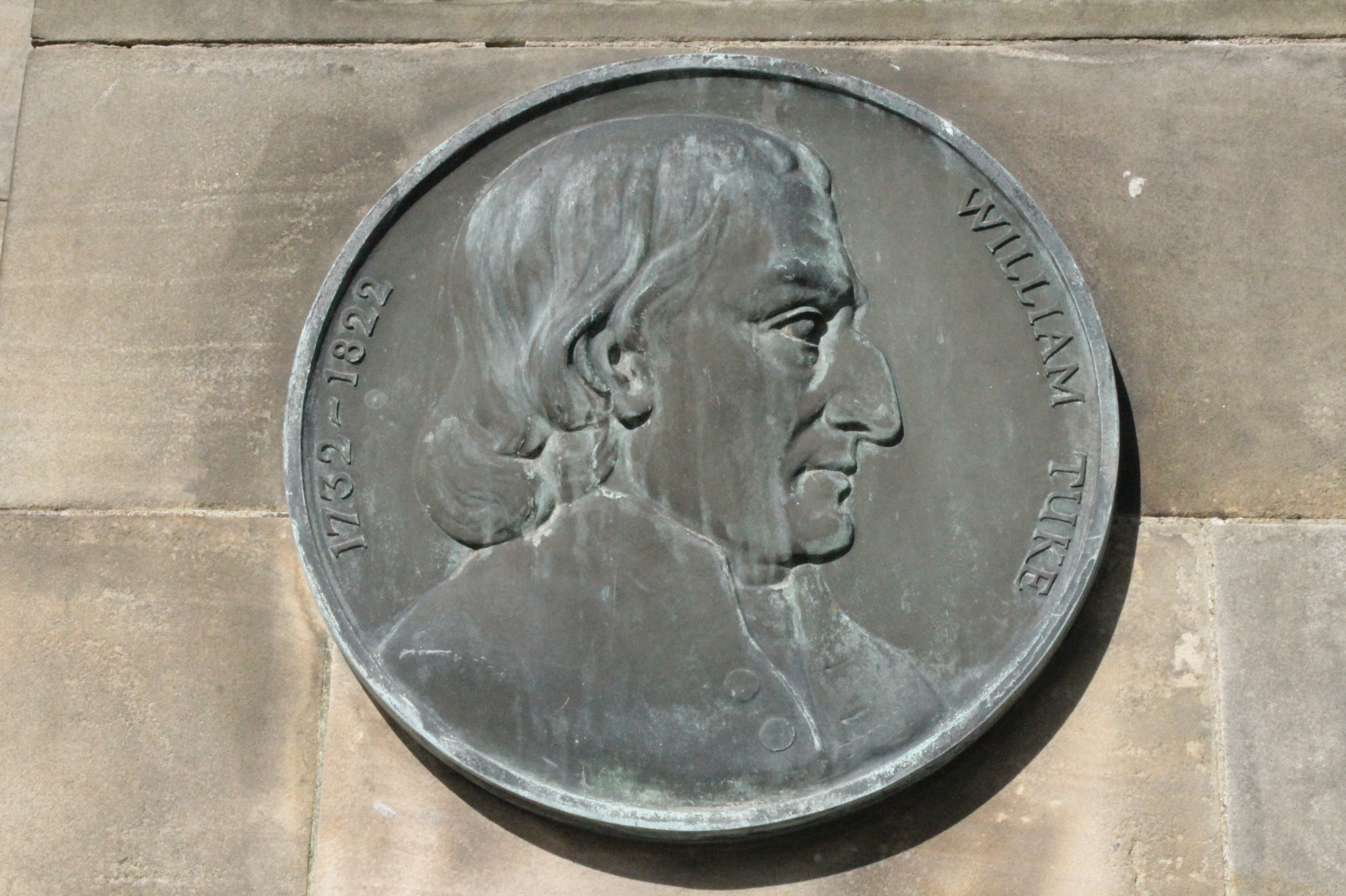
Memorial to William Tuke, Royal Edinburgh Hospital

William Tuke (24 March 1732 – 6 December 1822), an English tradesman, philanthropist and Quaker, earned fame for promoting more humane custody and care for people with mental disorders, using what he called gentler methods that came to be known as moral treatment. He played a big part in founding The Retreat at Lamel Hill, York, for treating mental-health needs. He and his wife Esther Maud backed strict adherence to Quaker principles. He was an abolitionist, a patron of the Bible Society, and an opponent of the East India Company's inhumane practices.

== Early life ==
William Tuke was born on 24 March 1732 in York into a prominent Quaker family. His father Samuel was a stuff-weaver and shopkeeper, who died when Tuke was 16. His mother Ann died seven years later. Tuke attended boarding school for two or three years, after which he pursued further studies under clergymen. At age 14, he began an apprenticeship at his aunt's wholesale tea business, which he inherited on her death in 1746.

== Family life ==
Tuke married Elizabeth Hoyland in 1754 and fathered four children. After Elizabeth died giving birth to their fifth child, Tuke met and married Esther Maud in 1765. Tuke and his wife were deeply involved in the Religious Society of Friends and advocated stricter adherence to Quaker principles. For five decades, he travelled to London for the Yearly Meeting, serving as clerk there in 1783. Meanwhile, Tuke remained involved in the family business alongside his eldest son and business partner, Henry. Ann Tuke, his daughter by Esther Maud, married William Alexander of the prominent Ipswich Quaker banking family.

== The Retreat ==
In 1791, William Tuke was moved by an incident involving Hannah Mills, a melancholic Quaker widow, who died unexpectedly at York Lunatic Asylum. Although her cause of death was unclear, mistreatment was suspected and the managers had forbidden Mills from having visitors. Tuke's daughter Ann proposed founding a mental institution run by Quakers for their own members. At a Society of Friends meeting in March 1792, Tuke presented a plan for those who "laboured under that most afflictive dispensation — the loss of reason." However, the proposal met with significant opposition. Some members felt such a move was unnecessary, while others saw it as overstepping the jurisdiction of a Quaker community. The small minority of supporters included Tuke's son, Henry, and the grammarian Lindley Murray.

During a visit to St. Luke's Hospital in London, Tuke witnessed appalling conditions for patients. He was particularly affected by a naked female patient who had been chained to a wall. Tuke believed the abuse was not cruel in intent, but marked a lack of effective alternatives.

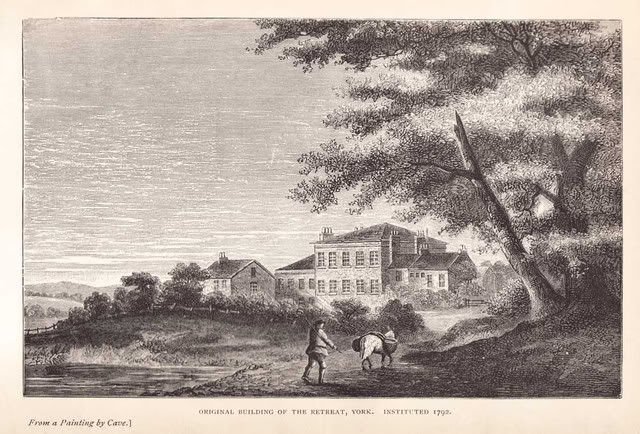
York Retreat original building c. 1796

By 1795, financial and social support from the community was still limited. The Society of Friends eventually approved the plan when Tuke's friend, Lindley Murray, suggested raising funds through annuities. Tuke bought 11 acres of land (4.5 ha) for £938 and worked closely with a London architect, John Bevans, to carry out his vision for the new asylum. Unlike other institutions at the time, York Retreat featured long, airy corridors where patients could stroll, even if they were kept from going outside. A month after the first patients arrived in June 1796, the unexpected death of its superintendent, Timothy Maud, forced Tuke to step in and run the Retreat himself.

William Tuke allowed his doctors to make their own observations and apply them in practice. Bleeding and other traditional remedies were abandoned in favour of gentler methods, such as warm baths for patients with melancholia. Tuke believed that physical and mental health were inextricably linked and stressed the need for proper diet and exercise. He sought to instil a sense of reason, not fear, and limited the use of physical restraints. Patients were encouraged to make themselves comfortable and often took up tasks like sewing and knitting.

The approach was widely derided at first. William Tuke noted, "All men seem to desert me." However, it eventually became famous worldwide as a model for more humane, psychologically based approaches.

== Other work ==
Outside his work at the Retreat, Tuke helped to found three Quaker schools: Ackworth School, Bootham School, and Trinity Lane Quaker Girls' School. The last was run by Tuke's second wife Esther until her death in 1794. The Tuke family continued to run it until 1812, by which time 500 students had passed through.

As a patron of the Bible Society, Tuke attended its meetings and made generous donations. Tuke campaigned against the slave trade and supported the abolitionist William Wilberforce in the 1806 Yorkshire parliamentary election.

Tuke was one of few voices in Britain opposing the East India Company for its inhumanity in other countries. He also supported the African Institution, which sought to create a viable, civilized refuge for freed slaves in Sierra Leone.

Towards the end of his career, a resurgence of patient abuse at York Asylum prompted Tuke to take to the local press and demand urgent reform. Tuke provided evidence to the Select Committee on Madhouses in May 1815, which led to further inquiries and passage of the County Asylums Act in 1828.

== Final years and death ==
Tuke remained involved with the Retreat until he became blind at the age of 82. He died on 6 December 1822 after a paralytic attack.

== Legacy ==
Several of Tuke's family pursued similar philanthropic work. The York Retreat was founded by his son Henry (1755–1815), at whose request his own son Samuel wrote an 1813 account of it and popularized the principles of "moral treatment". Samuel's son James Hack Tuke also helped to manage the York Retreat, while his brother Daniel Hack Tuke co-wrote A Manual of Psychological Medicine (1858) and became a leading medical expert on insanity. His daughter Sarah Tuke Grubb founded a school in Ireland.

Michel Foucault in his work Madness and Civilization discusses the advent of new types of detention by comparing and contrasting the accomplishments of William Tuke and Philippe Pinel in their respective countries.
