= Charles Barclay (MP) =

British brewer, landowner and Member of Parliament

Charles Barclay (26 December 1780 – 5 December 1855) of Bury Hill, Surrey, was a British brewer and landowner, who also served as a Tory Member of Parliament for the constituencies of Southwark (1815–1818), Dundalk (1826–1830), and West Surrey (1835–1837). Closely related to both the Barclay and (through his mother) Gurney banking dynasties, he came from a prominent Quaker family and was cousin of social reformer Elizabeth Fry.

== Life ==
Charles Barclay was born in Cheapside, London on 26 December 1780, the eldest son of Robert Barclay (1751–1830) and his first wife Rachel Gurney (1755–1794). The couple, who were married on 10 October 1775, both came from wealthy Quaker families with interests in the textile trade and banking. Charles' great-grandfather, David Barclay of Cheapside (1682–1769), was a draper and one of the richest merchants in London, whom after his first wife died wed the much younger daughter of John Freame (1669–1745), a co-founder of the present Barclays bank. Through her great-grandfather John Gurney (1655–1721), Charles' mother was related to brothers John (1719–1779) and Henry Gurney (1721–1777), who together founded Gurney's Bank of Norwich in 1770. This became part of Barclays in 1896.

Although brought up a Quaker, Charles volunteered to serve in the local militia when the country was threatened with invasion from French forces under Napoleon.

On 1 August 1804 he married Anna Maria Kett, the eldest daughter of Thomas Kett (a lineal descendant of Robert Kett, who led a rebellion against Norfolk landowners in 1549). The couple had 4 sons and 3 daughters, of whom his second son Robert (1808–1843) became a director of the Bank of England.

Charles Barclay died on 5 December 1855, having been involved in a serious riding accident about two weeks previously, when "in consequence of meeting the hounds, he lost command of his horse, and fell to the ground, sustaining so much injury as to result in his death."

== Publications ==
- Barclay, Charles, ed. (1833). Letters From the Dorking Emigrants Who Went to Upper Canada in the Spring of 1832. Dorking: Robert Best Ede – via HathiTrust.
