= Andrew Buxton =

British banker

Andrew Robert Fowell Buxton CMG (born 1939) was a British banker who was the first group chief executive of Barclays from 1992–93, and group chairman from 1993-99.

== Early life ==
Andrew Robert Fowell Buxton was born in 1939. His father was Captain Joseph Gurney Fowell Buxton (1913-1943). He is a descendant of Sir Fowell Buxton, 1st Baronet.

He was educated at Winchester College. He graduated from the University of Oxford. He did his national service with the Grenadier Guards.

== Career ==
In 1993, he succeeded Sir John Quinton as chairman of Barclays Bank. He was chairman until 1999.

Business positions
New creation	Group Chief Executive of Barclays; 1992-1993	Succeeded by Martin Taylor
Preceded by Sir John Quinton	Group Chairman of Barclays; 1993-1999	Succeeded by Sir Peter Middleton
