= Boath (surname) =

Boath is a surname. Notable people with the surname include:

- Allan Boath (born 1958), New Zealand footballer
- Freddie Boath (born 1991), English actor
- Richard Boath (born 1958), British banker
