= Timothy Bevan =

British banker (1927–2016)

Sir Timothy Bevan
- Born: Timothy Hugh Bevan; 24 May 1927
- Died: 11 February 2016 (aged 88)
- Education: Eton College
- Occupation: Banker
- Title: Chairman, Barclays Bank, 1981 to 1987
- Children: 4
- Relatives: Silvanus Bevan; David Barclay

Sir Timothy Hugh Bevan (24 May 1927 – 11 February 2016) was a British lawyer and heir to a banking dynasty. He was the chairman of Barclays Bank from 1981 to 1987.

== Early life ==
Born in May 1927, the younger brother of Robert Francis Bevan (who married Philippa Sumner), he is a direct descendant of both Silvanus Bevan (1743–1830) and of David Barclay (1682–1769), two of the original senior partners in Barclay, Bevan, Tritton and Co.

Bevan was educated at Eton College, before being commissioned in the British Army, and served with the Welsh Guards from 1945 to 1947. He studied the Law and was called to the bar in 1950.

== Career ==
Bevan started his career at the family business, Barclays Bank, in 1950 and worked in its offices in London, Manchester, Preston, and Luton, then in France and Cyprus until 1955, when he returned to Britain, joining the offices in Leeds, Nottingham, and Lombard Street, London.

He served on the Board of Directors of Barclays Bank from 1966 to 1993. From 1968 to 1974, he served as its Vice Chairman. He served as its Chairman from 1981 to 1987, being succeeded by Sir John Quinton.

Chairman of the Committee of London Clearing Bankers and Vice President of the Council of the Institute of Bankers, he also served as a member of the National Economic Development Council. Bevan was knighted on 14 February 1984.

He died on 11 February 2016 after a long illness, and was survived by a widow and four children.

== Philanthropy ==
Bevan served on the board of trustees of the Conservators of Ashdown Forest in East Sussex.
