= John Quinton (banker) =

English banker and football executive

John Quinton

Sir John Grand Quinton (21 December 1929 – 28 April 2012) was chairman of Barclays Bank from 1987 to 1992.

In 1987, he succeeded Timothy Bevan as chairman of Barclays Bank, until 1992, when he was succeeded by Andrew Buxton.

He was appointed a Knight Bachelor in the 1990 New Year Honours.

Quinton was the first chairman of the FA Premier League, from 1991 to 1999.

He died on 28 April 2012 aged 82.
