= Juniper Bank =

American direct bank (2000–2006)

- Industry: Banking
- Founded: January 2000; 26 years ago
- Defunct: May 25, 2006; 20 years ago
- Fate: Acquired by Barclays
- Headquarters: Wilmington, Delaware
- Key people: Richard Vague, CEO; Jim Stewart, President
- Products: Direct bank Credit cards

Juniper Bank was a direct bank based in Wilmington, Delaware. The bank focused on branded credit cards.

== History ==
The bank was founded in January 2000. It received financing from Benchmark Capital.

In November 2000, the bank began offering insurance products.

In September 2001, the Canadian Imperial Bank of Commerce acquired 51% of the company.

In August 2002, the Canadian Imperial Bank of Commerce made an additional $50 million investment in the company, bringing its ownership stake to 89%. Benchmark Capital sued, claiming that the terms of the offering were not fair.

In November 2002, the bank signed a deal with Airtran Airways to offer a branded credit card.

In 2004, the bank was acquired by Barclays.

In May 2005, the bank began offering a Harvard University branded credit card.

In August 2005, the bank invested $455 million to market a US Airways branded credit card.

On May 25, 2006, the bank was folded into Barclays credit card division and renamed.
