= John Silvester Varley =

British businessman

John Varley
- Born: 1 April 1956 (age 70); Warwick, England
- Education: Downside School
- Alma mater: Oriel College, Oxford; University of Law
- Occupation: Banker
- Known for: 2017 SFO fraud charge
- Title: former CEO, Barclays
- Term: 2004–11
- Predecessor: Matthew Barrett
- Successor: Bob Diamond
- Spouse: Carolyn Thorn Pease (m. 1984)
- Children: 2
- Relatives: Sir Richard Pease, 3rd Baronet (father-in-law)

John Silvester Varley (born 1 April 1956) is an English banker who was the group chief executive of Barclays from 2004 to 2011.

== Early life ==
John Silvester Varley was born in Warwick. His father, Philip, was a solicitor in Coventry. Varley was educated at the Catholic Downside School at Stratton-on-the-Fosse south of Bath, becoming head librarian, then at Oriel College, Oxford (MA History), and London's College of Law.

== Career ==
He became a solicitor with Frere Cholmeley (which became Frere Cholmeley Bischoff and was then bought by Eversheds in 1998) in 1979.

Varley joined Barclays in 1982, as part of the Corporate Finance Department of the then Barclays Merchant Bank. Senior appointments with the successor bank, BZW (now Barclays Capital), included deputy chief executive of BZW's Equity Division and head of BZW's offices in South East Asia. In 1995 he became chairman of the Asset Management Division and from April 1998 to October 2000 was chief executive, retail financial services. He joined the main Barclays board on 5 June 1998 and was group finance director from 2000 until the end of 2003.

On 1 January 2004, Varley became group deputy chief executive, and on 1 September 2004 he succeeded Matthew Barrett as group chief executive of Barclays. His annual salary from Barclays was £1,075,000. On 1 January 2011 he was succeeded as chief executive by Robert Diamond.

As of 2013, Varley was a trustee of The Prince of Wales's Charitable Foundation.

In June 2017, following a five-year investigation by the UK's Serious Fraud Office covering Barclays' activities during the 2008 financial crisis, Varley and three former colleagues, Roger Jenkins, Thomas Kalaris and Richard Boath, were charged with conspiracy to commit fraud and the provision of unlawful financial assistance. In June 2019, the SFO cleared Varley of fraud charges.

== Personal life ==
In 1981 he married Carolyn Thorn Pease, daughter of Sir Richard Pease, 3rd Baronet, and in so doing married into the Quaker Pease family, whose bank became part of Barclays in 1902.

His sister-in-law is the hedge fund manager Nichola Pease, who was married to hedge fund billionaire Crispin Odey.

They have two children. They live in Brook Green in Hammersmith, West London, and own a country house in Hampshire.

Business positions
Preceded by Matthew Barrett	Group Chief Executive of Barclays plc 2004–2010	Succeeded by Bob Diamond
