= Thomas Kalaris =

British banker

- Born: Thomas Llewellyn Kalaris; November 1955 (age 70)
- Education: Dickinson College; University of Chicago
- Occupation: Banker
- Known for: former chief executive of Barclays wealth and investment management

Thomas Llewellyn Kalaris (born November 1955) is a British banker, the former chief executive of Barclays wealth and investment management.

== Early life ==
Kalaris has a bachelor's degree from Dickinson College in Carlisle, Pennsylvania, and an MBA from the University of Chicago.

== Career ==
Kalaris joined Barclays in 1996, and was a member of the bank's executive committee from November 2009.

Kalaris was one of the co-founders of Saranac Partners, a wealth management company backed by Standard Life Aberdeen. He stepped down from the firm's management in June 2016, but remains an advisor and shareholder.

In June 2017, following a five-year investigation by the UK's Serious Fraud Office covering Barclays' activities during the 2008 financial crisis, the former Barclays chief executive John Varley and three former colleagues, Roger Jenkins, Kalaris and Richard Boath were charged with conspiracy to commit fraud and the provision of unlawful financial assistance.

In February 2020, Kalaris, along with Roger Jenkins and Richard Boath, were found not guilty on all charges.

In August 2024, Kalaris lost an appeal in a London tribunal to overturn a decision by the UK Financial Conduct Authority that barred him from holding senior industry positions.
