= David Barclay of Cheapside =

Scottish merchant and banker (1682–1769)

David Barclay of Cheapside (1682–1769) was a Scottish merchant and banker.

He was the second son of Robert Barclay, the Scottish Quaker writer, and was active in the Society of Friends. An apprentice in London in 1698, he became a leading linen merchant. Involved in banking through a family connection with John Freame, father of his second wife, Barclay was not directly concerned with the firm that much later became Barclays Bank; but two of his sons were, John and David Barclay of Youngsbury, who famously manumitted his slaves.

In 1761 he played host to the newly married King George III and Queen Charlotte, who came and watched the Lord Mayor's procession from the balcony of his house, which had been hung with crimson silk damask for the occasion. He had previously similarly entertained both George I (1714) and George II (1727).

Success in business brought Barclay a fortune of £100,000 at his death. He lived opposite St Mary-le-Bow, and was noted for his hospitality to Quaker ministers.

== Family ==
Barclay had 14 children: six (two sons and four daughters) by his first marriage to Anne Taylor (died 1720), and eight (two sons and four daughters) by his second wife Priscilla Freame, daughter of John Freame, whom he married in 1723. By his first marriage:

- His eldest son James married Susan Freame, sister to his stepmother Priscilla, and joined the Freame bank.

By his second marriage:

- His son David Barclay of Youngsbury (1729–1809) was one of the founders of the present-day Barclays Bank.
- His daughter Lucy (died 1757), married her cousin, the Member of Parliament Robert Barclay Allardice (1732-1797);. She died nine months after the marriage, leaving a daughter, also Lucy (1757–1817), who married Samuel Galton, Jr. of the Lunar Society. Robert Barclay (Allardice) was a grandson of Robert Barclay, elder brother of David Barclay of Cheapside.
- His daughter Christiana (c.1739–1796) married:
  - (i) Joseph Gurney (1729–1761), having with him two daughters, the elder being the Quaker minister Priscilla Hannah Gurney;
  - (ii) John Freame (died 1770), her first cousin;
  - and (iii) Sir William Watson, son of William Watson.
