= David Barclay of Youngsbury =

British merchant, banker and philanthropist (1729–1809)

David Barclay
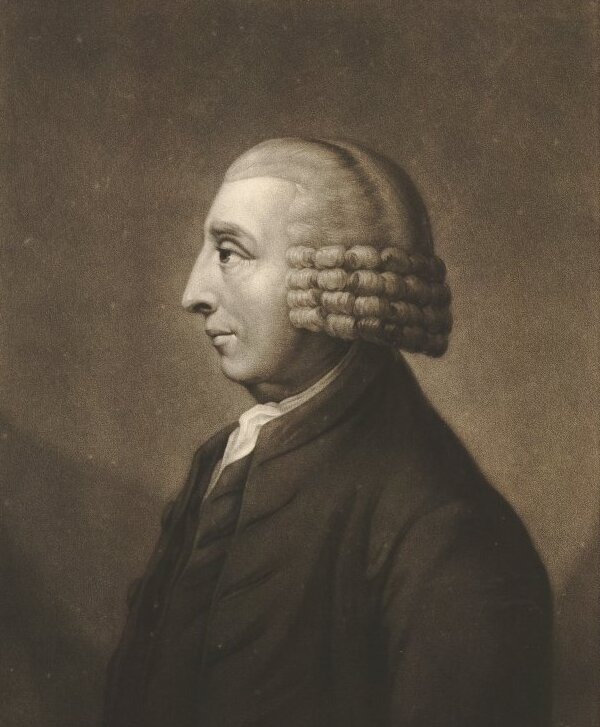
- Engraving of Barclay by Richard Earlom
- Born: 1729
- Died: 1809 (aged 79–80)
- Occupations: Businessman, merchant, banker

David Barclay of Youngsbury (1729 – 1809) was a British merchant, banker and philanthropist. He is notable for an experiment in "gratuitous manumission", in which he freed the slaves on his Jamaican plantation and arranged for better futures for them in Pennsylvania. His legacy was as one of the founders of the present-day Barclays Bank, a century ahead of its formation under that name, and in the brewing industry.

== Family background ==
He was the son of Scottish banker and merchant David Barclay of Cheapside (1682–1769), second son of Robert Barclay, eminent Quaker writer, and Priscilla Freame, daughter of the banker John Freame.

== The Barclay family bank ==
The origins of the Freame Bank, in which Barclay and his brother John inherited shares through their mother, go back at least to the first quarter of the 18th century. The name of the bank changed frequently, but it was generally known as Barclay, Bevan & Co., from the middle of the 1770s. Bevan was Silvanus Bevan III, son of Timothy Bevan and nephew of Silvanus Bevan II the apothecary; his mother was Elizabeth, Barclay's half-sister.

== American matters ==
Barclay traded with the colonies in America, and had connections particularly in Pennsylvania; the firm David Barclay & Sons had connections around 1760 with New York and Philadelphia merchants, and supplied the British military in North America. In the years before the outbreak of the American War of Independence, Barclay made use of Benjamin Franklin. The Barclay brothers used their insights into the North American situation as a guide to business strategy, first of all withdrawing from sales on commission, and then reducing their dependence on exporting across the Atlantic. At the end of the War they had closed down their old trade in linen.

Franklin's relationship with Quaker bankers went back 20 years, to his first English visit as agent for Pennsylvania: on that occasion he banked with Henton Brown's firm. Brown had met Robert Hunter Morris as incoming Pennsylvania governor in 1754; and in 1755, along with Barclay, Bevan, Fothergill, and Capel Hanbury became a committee member concerned with the interests of the Society of Friends there. In 1756 Barclay was ordering muskets for Thomas Penn; he also acted as London agent for William Allen.

In the crisis of the 1770s Barclay led the Committee of North American Merchants in their campaign for repeal of the Stamp Act 1765. He did not, however, endorse the extremes of opposition of the colonists. In November 1774 he called on Benjamin Franklin, in London, to discuss the worsening tensions in the cross-Atlantic relationship. Franklin, with Barclay and John Fothergill, drafted a plan to resolve the impasse existing after the Boston Tea Party of the previous year. Barclay met Lord North in 1775 to oppose moves against American access to fisheries, though without success, while Fothergill also worked behind the scenes.

After the War, American Quaker abolitionist delegations made their way to London. Barclay found them generally too impatient, and politically naive in their view that the way to apply pressure to Parliament was through the King. He diverted the abolitionist programme to getting the case for the abolition of slavery heard by politicians, with success.

== Barclay, Perkins, & Co. ==
In 1781 a consortium of Barclay and others bought the Anchor Brewery, Southwark, part of the estate of Henry Thrale. Barclay approached his widow Hester Thrale the month after his death, with a proposal to acquire a share in the business; this was much more welcome to her than the offer from the chief clerk, John Perkins. The deal, requiring some financial engineering, was a family affair involving his nephews: Robert Barclay (1750–1830, of Bury Hill near Dorking, Surrey), son of Barclay's half-brother Alexander, and Silvanus Bevan, to whom Perkins was connected through his wife. David Barclay found £135,000 for the firm. Henry Perkins, son of John, was more of a scholar, but retained an interest in the brewery. The name "H. Thrale and Company" was changed to "Barclay Perkins and Company", in 1798; that company merged with Courage Brewery in 1955.

== Youngsbury ==
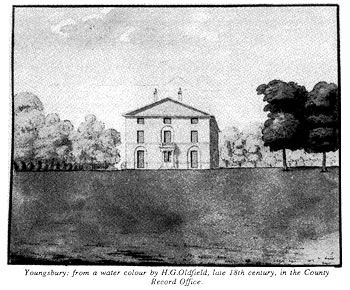
Youngsbury in the 18th century, recorded in a watercolour by Henry George Oldfield.

Barclay bought the manor of Youngsbury in Hertfordshire in 1769, and enlarged the house there. A plan by Capability Brown for Barclay in 1770 introduced a serpentine lake. He sold it in 1793, after the death of his second wife, to William Cunliffe Shawe, and it passed in 1796 to Daniel Giles, Governor of the Bank of England.

Barclay got to know John Scott of Amwell, that village being a few miles away, the other side of Ware; Scott was a fellow Quaker whom Barclay met on turnpike committees as well as at Friends' meetings. After Barclay had got to know Samuel Johnson through the Thrale brewery deal in 1781—Johnson being involved as an executor—Barclay approached him in 1784 to write the biography of Scott, who differed from Johnson in terms of politics, and in other matters. They met, and Johnson made light of the disagreements; but he died the following year, leaving Barclay money in his will. Barclay turned to John Hoole to write the biography.

== Philanthropy ==
Verene Shepherd, the Jamaican historian of diaspora studies, singles out the case of Barclay and how he chose, in 1794, to free his slaves in that colony. He and his brother had acquired Unity Valley Pen, a grazing farm in Saint Ann Parish, in return for a debt, and were discomforted to find themselves the owners of about 30 slaves. Barclay wrote that when his brother died, "I determined to try the experiment of liberating my slaves, firmly convinced, that the retaining of my fellow creatures in bondage was not only irreconcilable with the precepts of Christianity, but subversive of the rights of human nature ...." He hired a vessel to take them to America; his agent for the transfer, William Holden, was instructed to take them to Philadelphia and deliver them as emancipated to John Ashley, Barclay's agent there. The Pennsylvania Abolition Society saw to the training of this group in manual trades and domestic service.

Barclay's individual thoughts about negative impacts of the slave trade were unable to affect how close his banks' ties were with it, as they were financial backers of plantation estate mortgages and other projects related to the buying and selling of slaves

Barclay supported John Whitehead with an annuity. He was closely involved for the London Committee in the founding of Ackworth School, a Quaker school in Yorkshire.

== Family ==
He married twice, and had one child who survived to adulthood:

- To Martha Hudson; their daughter Agatha married Richard Gurney and was mother of Hudson Gurney, and Agatha who married Sampson Hanbury.
- To Rachel Lloyd, daughter of Sampson Lloyd II and sister of Charles Lloyd; she died in 1792 at Youngsbury.

Barclay supported the education of his grandson Hudson Gurney, which took place with his companion the polymath Thomas Young (two years older) at Youngsbury, from 1787 to 1792. Young also stayed at Barclay's London house, where he had access to the lectures of Bryan Higgins.

The Barclay extended family was large: David Barclay estimated it at 300 "who call me uncle or cousin".

In later life Barclay lived at Walthamstow.

== See also ==
- List of abolitionist forerunners
