= Goslings Bank =

Historical English Private Bank

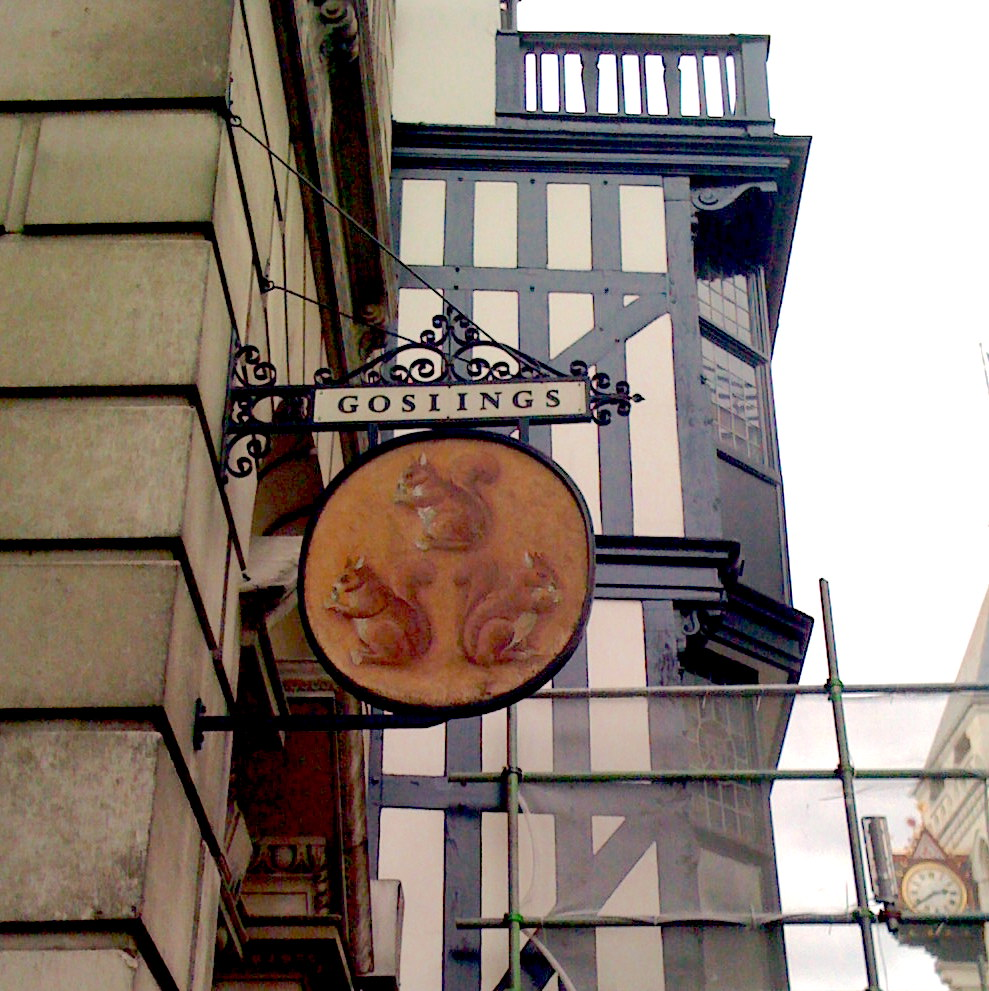
- The Sign of the Three Squirrels at Goslings Bank, London, in 2009
- Founded: 1650
- Defunct: 1896
- Fate: Acquired by Barclays
- Headquarters: London

Goslings Bank was an English private bank founded in 1650. From 1743 it was locatedat No. 19 Fleet Street, London, and identified to customers by a hanging signboard depicting three squirrels. It was acquired by Barclays bank in 1896.

== History ==
The bank originated in the business of Henry Pinckney, a goldsmith-banker who began trading in about 1650 at the sign of the Three Squirrels. The business passed through various hands until it came under the sole ownership of Thomas Ward, following the death of his partner in 1742. Ward brought in Sir Francis Gosling only for he (Ward) to die the following year. Ward's replacement was Samael Bennett, a prominent East India merchant who brought valuable Indian business. On Bennett's retirement, George Clive, a relative of Lord Clive, became a partner, the name of the firm changing to Gosling, Gosling and Clive. George Clive died in 1779 and more Goslings joined the partnership, the firm being known as Messrs Gosling for some years.

Benjamin Sharpe was the first employee to be appointed to the partnership. Sharpe had been a clerk at the Bank and was taken into partnership in 1794 and the name of the firm was changed to the familiar Goslings and Sharpe. Although there were always several Goslings in the partnership at any one time, a solitary Sharpe name remained in the partnership until the 1896 merger: the original Benjamin Sharpe; his son, and then grandson. In 1896, Goslings and Sharpe became one of the twenty constituent banks that merged to form Barclay and Company.

== Customers ==
Goslings Bank boasted a number of prominent customers, including St John's College, Oxford, St John's College, Cambridge, The Times newspaper, the Law Society, the Stationers Company, and the Society of Licensed Victuallers. Prominent individuals known to have banked with Goslings include Edward Austen Knight, Thomas Longman, and Sir Edwin Landseer.

== Legacy ==
The Goslings name is perpetuated by Barclays Bank as part of the group's history, and in several practical ways. The three squirrels sign is still maintained outside the Fleet Street branch at 19 Fleet Street, and the Goslings name is still printed in parentheses on cheques issued at that branch, as it has been since the 1896 merger.

== See also ==
Barrington Hall, Essex
