= C. S. Venkatakrishnan =

American banker

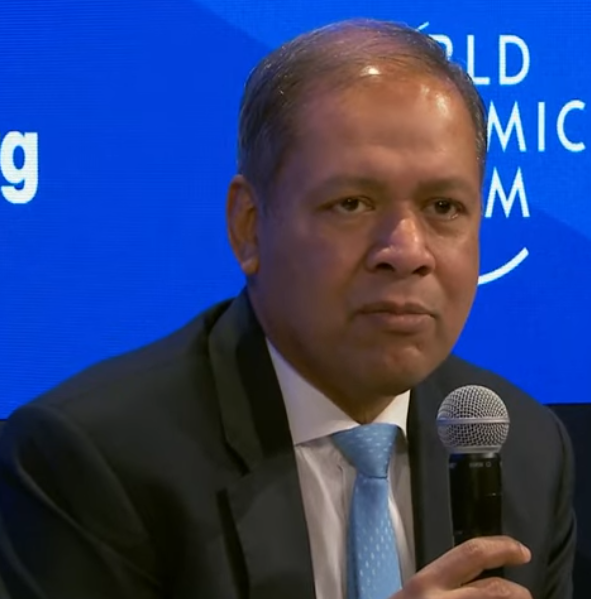
- At the WEF Annual Meeting in 2025
- Born: January 1966 (age 60); Mysore, Karnataka, India
- Education: Massachusetts Institute of Technology (PhD)
- Occupation: Banker
- Title: CEO, Barclays
- Term: November 2021-
- Predecessor: Jes Staley
- Children: 3
- Scientific career
- Thesis: Analysis and optimization of terminal area air traffic control operations (1991)
- Doctoral advisors: Amedeo Odoni; Arnold Barnett

Coimbatore Sundararajan Venkatakrishnan, also known as Venkat or C.S Venkat, is an Indian-American banker. He replaced Jes Staley as the group chief executive (CEO) of the British multinational bank Barclays in November 2021.

== Early life and education ==
Venkat was born in Mysore, India in January 1966. He earned bachelor's, master's and PhD degrees in operations research from the Massachusetts Institute of Technology. His 1991 thesis was entitled Analysis and Optimization of Terminal Area Air Traffic Control Operations.

== Career ==
Venkat worked for JPMorgan Chase from 1994 to 2016, where he held senior positions in asset management, investment banking, and in risk, rising to chief investment officer for global fixed income, responsible for about US$200 billion in assets. He joined Barclays in 2016 as chief risk officer, before becoming head of global markets and co-president of BBPLC in October 2020.

Venkat left JPMorgan for Barclays in early 2016, and was among the first people Staley hired when he became CEO of the bank. Venkat was initially the bank's chief risk officer. Venkat had been head of global markets for Barclays, and succeeded Jes Staley with immediate effect after Barclays was notified of the preliminary results from an investigation by the Financial Conduct Authority (FCA) and the Prudential Regulation Authority into "how Staley had characterised his relationship with [Jeffrey] Epstein to Barclays".

== Personal life ==
Venkat is based in London and New York. He was diagnosed with non-Hodgkin lymphoma in November 2022, and continued to work while being treated. He is in remission after completing the treatment in March 2023. Venkat is married and has three daughters, who he raised in the suburbs of New York.

Business positions
Preceded by Jes Staley	Group Chief Executive of Barclays plc 1 November 2021 – present	Incumbent
