= John Whitehead (physician) =

John Whitehead (1740?–1804) was an English physician and lay preacher, known as a biographer of John Wesley.

== Early life ==
He was born about 1740, apparently at Dukinfield, Cheshire, of parents who had left an older dissenting congregation to join the Moravians (1738). He had a classical education. Early in life he became connected with the movement of the Wesleys, having been converted by a Methodist preacher, Matthew Mayer of Stockport. He acted as a lay preacher at Bristol.

Whitehead then married and set up in Bristol as a linendraper. Successful in business, he moved to London, where he joined the Society of Friends, became a Quaker speaker, and ran a large boarding-school at Wandsworth.

== Physician ==
David Barclay of Youngsbury offered him a life annuity of £100 to travel with his son on the continent; Whitehead accepted and entered Leiden University as a medical student on 16 September 1779 (age given as 39), and graduated M.D. on 4 February 1780. On the death (19 January 1781) of John Kooystra, M.D., he became physician to the London dispensary, through the influence of John Coakley Lettsom. He was admitted a licentiate of the Royal College of Physicians on 25 March 1782.

In 1784 the Friends pushed his candidature as physician to the London Hospital; he was returned as elected on 28 July, but the election was declared not valid, one vote being bad through a slight informality.

== Methodist ==
Whitehead attended the Wesleys as their medical adviser, left the Society of Friends in 1784, and again became a Methodist; he would have quit his medical practice, and devoted himself entirely to the ministry, if Wesley had given him ordination. He preached the funeral sermon for Wesley, which went through four editions in 1791, and realised £200, which he handed over to the society.

== The Wesley biographies ==
Wesley left his papers to Thomas Coke, Whitehead, and Henry More, giving them discretion as his literary executors. The three agreed to bring out a life of Wesley, but to await the appearance of a promised life by John Hampson. This life, mainly written and in great part printed before Wesley's death, was in fact the work of Hampson's father (also John Hampson), who had left Methodism. At a meeting of preachers James Rogers proposed, and the executors agreed, that Whitehead should paid to write the biography; and he was entrusted with all Wesley's papers. Hampson's ‘Life’ was published at Sunderland in June 1791. On 6 July Whitehead issued Proposals for printing by subscription a competing life; with the proposals was printed a document signed (21 June) by Wolff, Horton, and Marriott, Wesley's general executors, soliciting Whitehead to write the life. At the conference (opened at Manchester on 26 July) the arrangement was confirmed and Whitehead was placed on the book committee. Whitehead now claimed the copyright and half the profits.

A wrangle arose about Whitehead's custody and use of Wesley's papers. On 9 December 1791 the quarterly circuit meeting removed him from the list of preachers; subsequently the authorities at City Road Chapel withheld his ticket of membership. Cooke and Moore at undertook a further life of Wesley, without access to his papers, which Whitehead denied them. The work, mainly by Moore, was begun in January and completed in February 1792; published on 2 April, it had the authority of conference; two editions of ten thousand copies each were disposed of within the year. At the conference of July and August 1792, Whitehead was called pon to submit the papers for examination and sifting. His offered compromise was accepted by a committee, but the dispute went on; both parties began civil actions. Proceedings were stayed; the London society paying all costs, amounting to over £2,000.

The first volume of Whitehead's Life of Wesley was published in 1793; the included ‘Life’ of Charles Wesley was issued separately in the same year, and the second volume appeared in 1796. In 1796 Whitehead returned Wesley's papers to the Methodist book-room, but before they reached Moore's hands (1797) some had been destroyed by John Pawson. Moore brought out his new life of Wesley in 1824–5: it used Whitehead's work, sometimes without acknowledgment. Whitehead's Life was reprinted at Dublin in 1806, with some additions.

== Last years ==
In 1797 Whitehead was restored to Membership in the Methodist body. He died at his residence, Fountain Court, Old Bethlem, in 1804. He left a widow (Mary), children, and grandchildren. His funeral sermon was preached by Joseph Benson.

== Works ==
Besides the life of Wesley, Whitehead published:

- An Essay on Liberty and Necessity. … By Philaretus [1775], against Augustus Toplady.
- Materialism philosophically examined, 1778, against Joseph Priestley.
- Tentamen physiologicum … sistens novam theoriam de causa reciprocarum in corde et arteriis contractionum, Leyden, 1780.
- To whom it belongs, 1781, (a Quaker broadsheet, signed "Principle").
- A Report … of a Memoir containing a New Method of treating … Puerperal Fever, 1783, (translated from the French of Denis Claude Doulcet, with notes).
- A Letter on the Difference between the Medical Society of Crane Court and Dr. Whitehead, 1784
- A True Narrative of … the Difference between Dr. Coke, Mr. Moore, Mr. Rogers, and Dr. Whitehead, concerning … the Life of … Wesley, 1792.
- A Defence of a True Narrative, 1792.
- A Letter to the Methodist Preachers, 1792.
- Circular to the Methodist Preachers, 1792.

== Notes ==
Attribution

This article incorporates text from a publication now in the public domain: "Whitehead, John (1740?-1804)". Dictionary of National Biography. London: Smith, Elder & Co. 1885–1900.
