= William Watson (physician) =

Sir William Watson (1744–1824) was an English physician and naturalist, elected a Fellow of the Royal Society in 1767 and knighted in 1796. He was mayor of Bath in 1801.

He was the son of Sir William Watson the physicist, educated at Charterhouse School, and Queens' College and Gonville and Caius College of the University of Cambridge. He graduated M.B in 1766 and M.D. in 1771, and went into practice as a physician in Bath.

Watson was a friend and associate of William Herschel, whom he met by chance in Bath in 1779.
