= John Freame =

English banker

- Born: 1669; Cirencester, England
- Died: 1745 (aged 75–76)
- Occupation: Banker
- Spouse: Priscilla Gould
- Children: Priscilla Freame
- Parent: Robert Freame
- Relatives: David Barclay of Cheapside (son-in-law); David Barclay of Youngsbury (grandson)

John Freame (1669–1745) was an English Quaker goldsmith and banker. In 1690 he co-founded Freame & Gould, which later became Barclays Bank.

== Early life ==
Freame was born in Cirencester, England, in 1669, the son of Robert Freame. He was baptised on 11 November of the same year. In 1683, he was apprenticed to Job Bolton, a Quaker goldsmith based in Lombard Street.

== Career ==
Upon completion of his apprenticeship, Freame gained his Freedom of the City on 7 April 1690, giving him the right to open a business within the City of London as a goldsmith, and went into partnership with Thomas Gould, a fellow Quaker.

In 1728, the business moved to 54 Lombard Street, identified as the ‘Sign of the Black Spread Eagle’.

In 1713, Freame published Scripture Instruction: Digested into Several Sections by Way of Questions & Answers in Order to Promote Piety & Virtue, and Discourage Vice & Immorality, with a Preface Relating to Education.

== Personal life ==
On 19 August 1697, at the Friends' Meeting at Devonshire House, London, Freame married Priscilla Gould, a sister of his business partner Thomas Gould, who himself married Freame's sister Hannah.

== Death ==
He died in 1745 at the age of 76.
