= Martin Taylor (businessman) =

British businessman (born 1952)

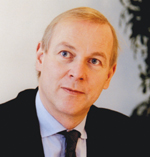
- Born: 8 June 1952 (age 74); Burnley, Lancashire, United Kingdom
- Education: Balliol College, Oxford
- Occupation: Chairman of RTL Group
- Known for: Former CEO of Barclays
- Children: 3

Martin Taylor (born 8 June 1952) is a British businessman and former chief executive of Barclays Bank. He is an external member of the Bank of England's Financial Policy Committee.

== Career ==
Taylor started his career in 1974 and joined Reuters as a journalist. He then moved to the Financial Times in 1978, where he edited the paper's "Lex" column.

In 1984, he joined the board of Courtaulds, becoming chief executive of Courtaulds Textiles by 1990. He became chief executive of Barclays four years later, in 1994, remaining there until 1998. He joined the board at retail chain W H Smith in 1999, eventually becoming chief executive before departing in 2003.

He was a member of the UK Parliament select Committee for Science and Technology for five years. He also joined the Institute for Public Policy Research (IPPR) and compiled their 2001 Commission on Public/Private Partnerships report.

He was the Secretary General of the Bilderberg Group for several years.

Taylor was vice-chairman of the board of RTL Group, before being elevated to chairman in 2019, and was formerly chairman of Syngenta AG and of the Syngenta Foundation for Sustainable Agriculture. He was an international adviser to Goldman Sachs until 2005.

He was appointed to the Bank of England Financial Policy Committee in March 2013.

== Education and life ==
Taylor was born in Burnley, Lancashire, and educated at Eton and Balliol College, Oxford, where he earned a degree in Oriental languages. Taylor is married and has two daughters and a son.
