= Richard Boath =

British banker

- Education: University of Manchester
- Occupation: Banker
- Known for: former Barclays global co-head of finance

Richard Boath is a British banker, the former Barclays global co-head of finance.

== Early life ==
Richard Boath is the son of a senior chemicals company executive , and a former Miss Manchester. He has a bachelor's degree in management science from the University of Manchester.

== Career ==
Boath started his career in 1980 with Bank of America as a corporate banking account officer. In 1982, he joined Security Pacific, then in 1988, Merrill Lynch, and in 1990 Salomon Brothers, before joining Barclays in 2000, rising to co-head of financial institutions for Europe, the Middle East and Africa (EMEA) by 2013 and chairman of the bank's EMEA financial institutions group in 2014. I

In 2016, Boath left Barclays, alleging that he had been unfairly dismissed after the Serious Fraud Office disclosed documents to Barclays. Boath subsequently pursued an employment law claim against the bank, adjourned in December 2016 and recommenced in September 2017.

As of 2026, Boath is an adviser at Agora, a firm developing distributed ledger technology solutions for bonds.

== Barclays fraud case ==
In June 2017, following a five-year investigation by the UK's Serious Fraud Office covering Barclays' activities during the 2008 financial crisis, the former Barclays chief executive John Varley and three former colleagues, Roger Jenkins, Thomas Kalaris and Boath were charged with conspiracy to commit fraud and the provision of unlawful financial assistance.

In February 2020, Boath, along with Thomas Kalaris and Roger Jenkins, were found not guilty on all charges. Varley had previously been cleared of the same charges in June 2019.
