= Peter Middleton (banker) =

British banker

Sir Peter Middleton GCB
- Born: 2 April 1934 (age 92); Sheffield, South Yorkshire, England
- Education: University of Sheffield; University of Bristol
- Occupation: Banker

Sir Peter Edward Middleton GCB (born 2 April 1934) is a British UK Chairman of Marsh & McLennan Companies, former banker and former Chancellor of the University of Sheffield. He is currently on the board of the Philharmonia Orchestra.

== Life ==
Middleton was born on 2 April 1934 in Sheffield. His father was Thomas Edward Middleton. He was educated at Sheffield City Grammar School and at the University of Sheffield where he gained a first class degree in economics in 1955 with further study at the University of Bristol. He lives in Kensington.

== Career ==
=== The Treasury ===
After National Service in the Royal Army Pay Corps, Sir Peter joined HM Treasury, ultimately ascending to become Permanent Secretary from 1983 to 1991.

=== Barclays Bank ===
Sir Peter joined Barclays in 1991 as Group Deputy Chairman and Executive Chairman of Barclays de Zoete Wedd (BZW). He became Chairman of Barclays Capital following the reorganisation of BZW in October 1997 and was appointed Barclays Group Chairman in April 1999. During this time he was also a board member of Bass PLC from 1992 to 2001 and General Accident (later CGU) from 1992 to 1995. He was appointed chairman of the Barclays Group Asia Pacific Advisory Committee in 2004.

=== CEDR ===
Sir Peter Middleton was appointed CEDR Chairman in September 2004 following his retirement as Group Chairman of Barclays.

=== Other ===
He was appointed UK chairman, Marsh & McLennan Companies in 2007, chairman of Marsh Ltd in 2005, chairman of Mercer Ltd in 2009. He is chairman of Burford Capital and Hamilton Ventures since 2009. He was deputy chairman of United Utilities from 1994 to 2007, he is Chairman of Creative Sheffield (2005 -)(previously Sheffield Urban Regeneration Company 2000-2005(Sheffield One). He is a senior partner of Fenchurch Advisory Partners (since 2005); He was on the board of the National Institute of Economic and Social Research from 1996 to 2007. He is a governor of the Ditchley Foundation. He was President of the British Bankers' Association from 2004 to 2006 (BBA). and was Chairman of Camelot Group plc from 2004 - 2010. He was a member of the IAP of the International Monetary Authority of Singapore from 2004 to 2006. He is a Member of the Court of the Worshipful Company of International Bankers (Master in 2006/7) and a member of the Board of Patrons of the European Association for Banking and Financial History e.V.

== Honours ==
Middleton took on the role of Chancellor of the University of Sheffield on 9 October 1999. He has also been a visiting fellow at Nuffield College, Oxford. He was knighted KCB in 1984 and GCB in 1989.

Academic offices
Preceded by Frederick Dainton	Chancellor of the University of Sheffield; 1999–2015	Succeeded by Lady Justice Rafferty
