= Barclays =

British banking and financial services company

Barclays PLC
- Barclays' current logo, used since 2004

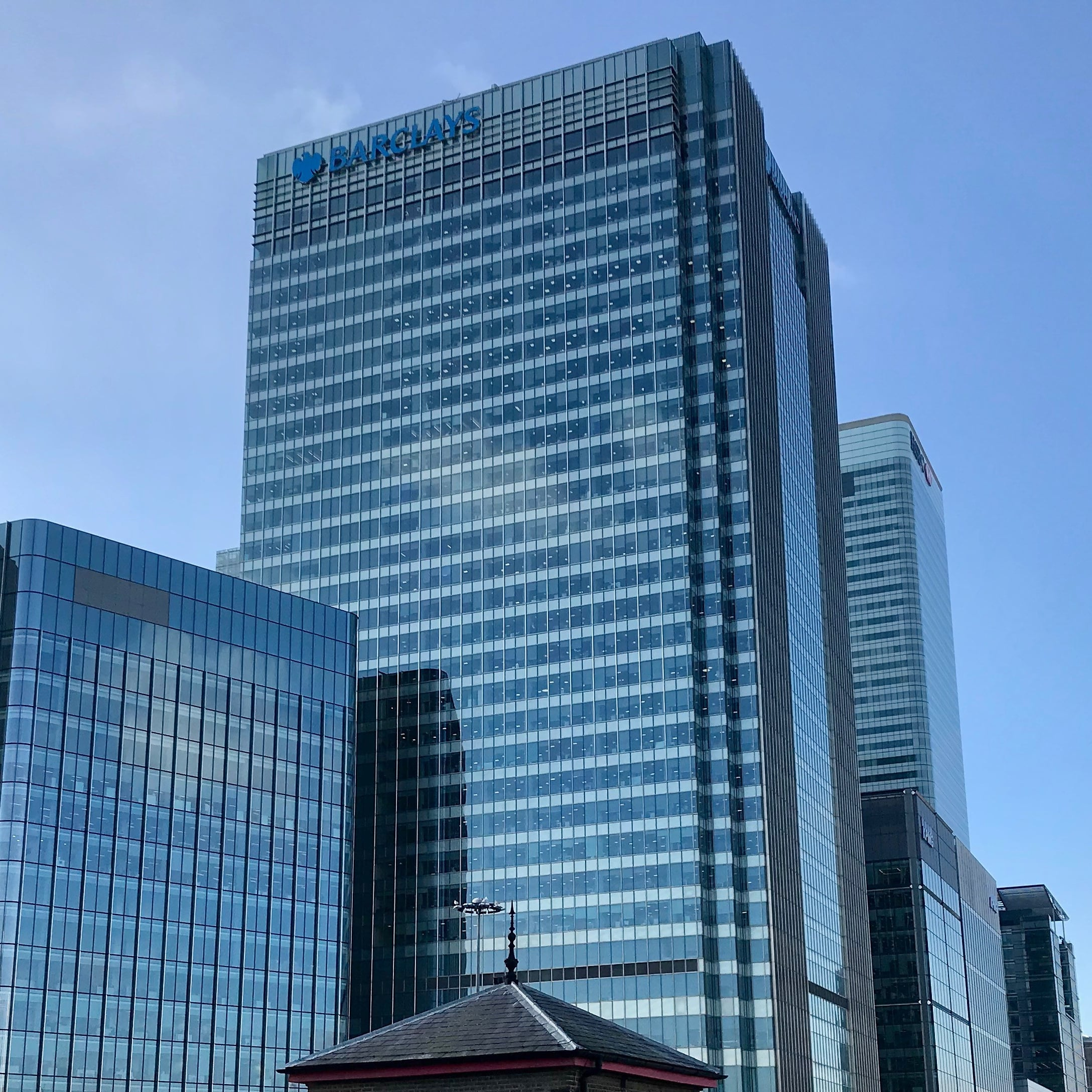
- Headquarters at One Churchill Place in Canary Wharf, London
- Formerly: Barclays Bank PLC (1896–1985)
- Type: Public
- Traded as: LSE: BARC; NYSE: BCS; FTSE 100 component
- ISIN: GB0031348658
- Industry: Financial services
- Founded: 17 November 1690; 335 years ago in the City of London, Kingdom of England
- Headquarters: One Churchill Place, Canary Wharf, London, England
- Area served: Worldwide
- Key people: Nigel Higgins (group chairman); C. S. Venkatakrishnan (group chief executive)
- Products: Asset management; Banking; Commodities; Credit cards; Equities trading; Insurance; Investment management; Mortgage loans; Private equity; Wealth management
- Revenue: ▲£29.140 billion (2025)
- Operating income: ▲£9.139 billion (2025)
- Net income: ▲£7.213 billion (2025)
- Total assets: ▲£1.544 trillion (2025)
- Total equity: ▲£78.236 billion (2025)
- Number of employees: 100,000 (2026)
- Divisions: Barclays UK; Barclays International
- Website: home.barclays

Barclays PLC (/ˈbɑːrkliz/, occasionally /-leɪz/) is a British multinational universal bank, headquartered in London, England. Barclays operates as five divisions: the UK Consumer Bank, UK Corporate Bank, Private Bank and Wealth Management (PBWM), Investment Bank, and the US Consumer Bank.

Barclays traces its origins to the goldsmith banking business established in the City of London in 1690 by Quakers John Freame and Thomas Gould. James Barclay became a partner in the business in 1736. In 1896, twelve banks in London and the English provinces, including Goslings Bank, Backhouse's Bank and Gurney, Peckover and Company, united as a joint-stock bank under the name Barclays and Co. Over the following decades, Barclays expanded to become a nationwide bank. In 1967, Barclays deployed the world's first cash dispenser. Barclays has made numerous corporate acquisitions, including of London, Provincial and South Western Bank in 1918, British Linen Bank in 1919, Mercantile Credit in 1975, the Woolwich in 2000 and the North American operations of Lehman Brothers in 2008.

Barclays has a primary listing on the London Stock Exchange and is a constituent of the FTSE 100 Index. It has a secondary listing on the New York Stock Exchange. It is considered a systemically important bank by the Financial Stability Board. According to a 2011 paper, Barclays was the most powerful transnational corporation in terms of ownership and thus corporate control over global financial stability and market competition, with Axa and State Street Corporation taking the 2nd and 3rd positions, respectively. Barclays operates in over 40 countries, employs over 80,000 people.

Barclays UK comprises the British retail banking operations, consumer credit card business, wealth management business, and corporate banking for small, medium and large-sized businesses in the UK. Barclays International consists of Barclays Corporate & Investment Bank (formerly known as Barclays Capital) and the Consumer, Cards & Payments business. The bulge-bracket investment banking business provides advisory, financing and risk management services to large companies, institutions and government clients. It is a primary dealer in Gilts, U.S. Treasury securities and various European government bonds.

According to S&P Global's April 2026 report, Barclays is Europe's fifth largest bank by assets, with $2.078 trillion in assets.

== Name ==
The bank's name has never included an apostrophe (Barclay's) in its spelling. It was first registered in 1896 as "Barclay and Company, Limited", changed to "Barclays Bank Limited" in 1917 and to "Barclays Bank PLC" in 1982.

== History ==
=== 1690 to 1900 ===
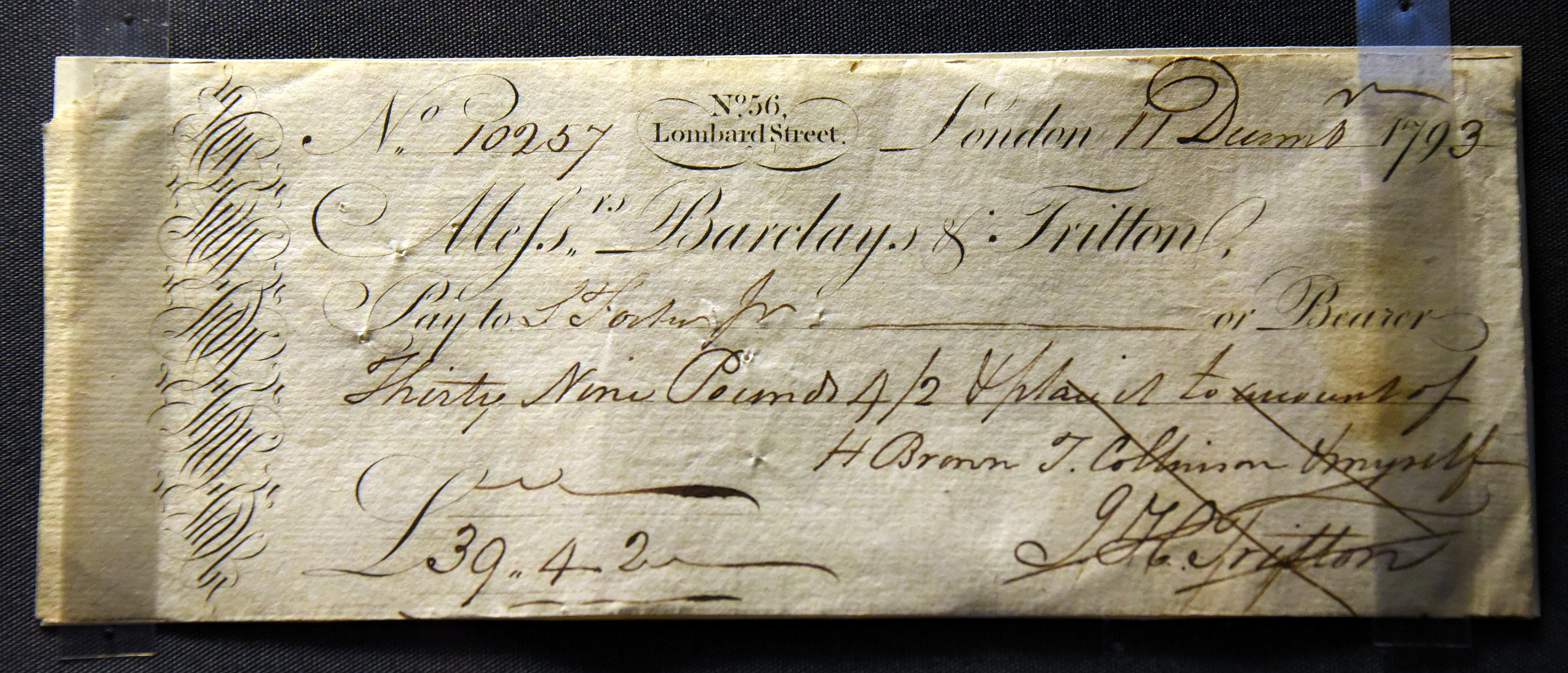
Barclays and Co. cheque for 39 pounds, 4 shillings, and 2 pence, issued in London by Messrs Barclay and Tritton, 1793, on display at the British Museum in London

Barclays traces its origins back to 17 November 1690, when two Quakers, John Freame and Thomas Gould, started trading as goldsmith bankers in Lombard Street, London. The name "Barclays" became associated with the business in 1736, when Freame's son-in-law James Barclay became a partner. In 1728, the bank moved to 54 Lombard Street, identified by the "Sign of the Black Spread Eagle", which in subsequent years would become a core part of the bank's visual identity.

The Barclay family were connected with slavery, both as proponents and opponents. David and Alexander Barclay were engaged in the slave trade in 1756. David Barclay of Youngsbury (1729–1809), on the other hand, was a noted abolitionist, and Verene Shepherd, the Jamaican historian of diaspora studies, states that he chose to free his slaves in that colony.

In 1776, the firm was styled "Barclay, Bevan and Bening" and remained so until 1785, when another partner, John Tritton, who had married a Barclay, was admitted, and the business then became "Barclay, Bevan, Bening and Tritton". In 1896, twelve houses in London and the English provinces, notably Goslings and Sharpe, Backhouse's Bank of Darlington and Gurney's Bank of Norwich (the latter two of which also had their roots in Quaker families), united to form Barclays and Co., a joint-stock bank, which at its formation held around one quarter of deposits in English private banks.

=== 1900 to 1945 ===
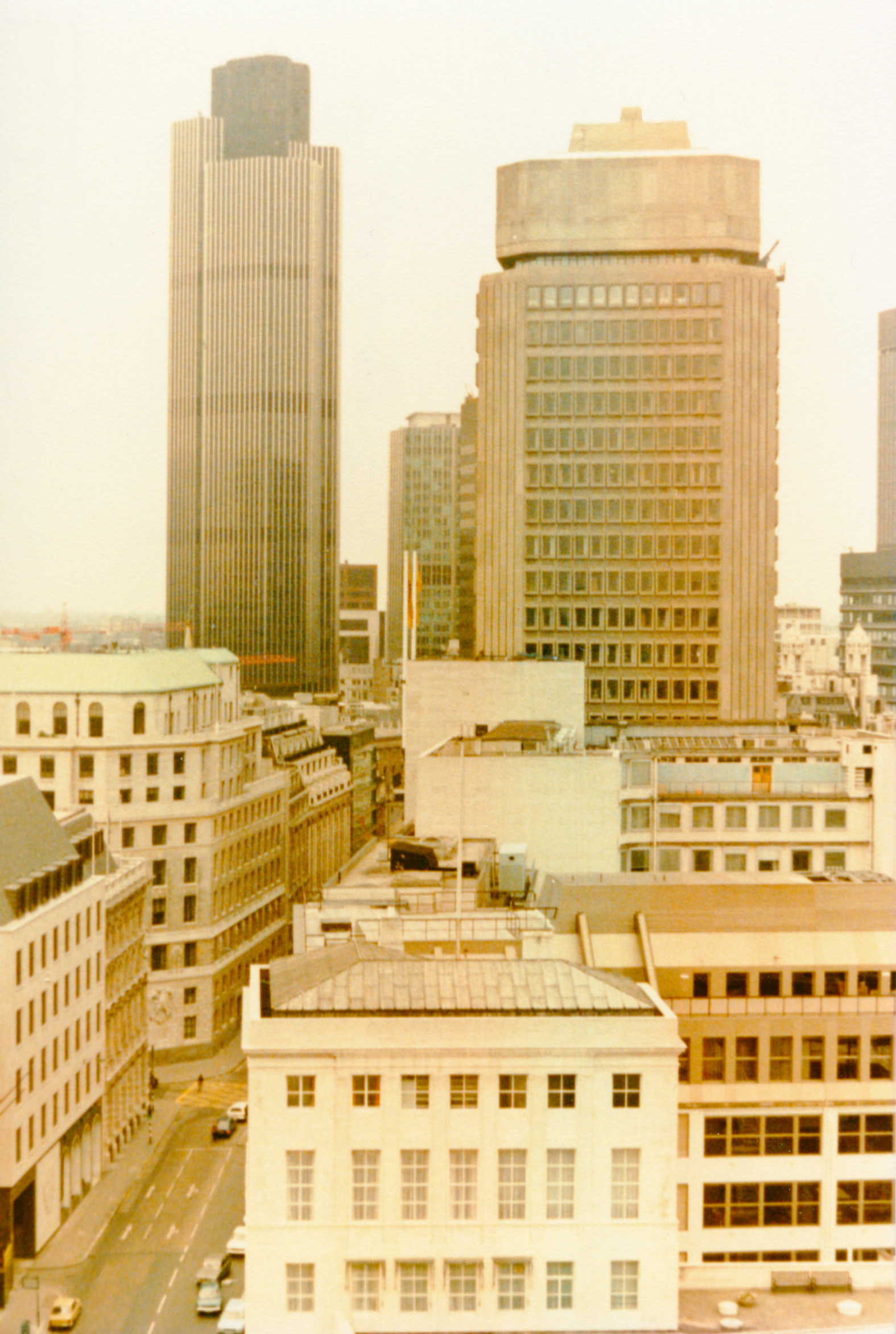
The longstanding head office of Barclays on the corner of Lombard Street and Gracechurch Street (lower left) before its demolition in the late 1980s

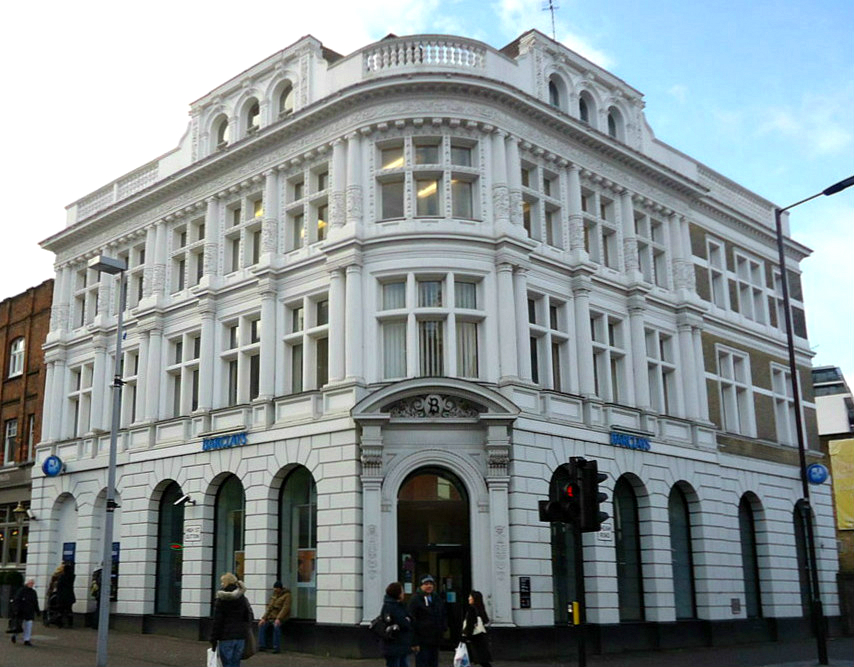
Barclays branch in Sutton, southern Greater London, which was originally a branch of London and Provincial prior to acquisition by Barclays

Between 1905 and 1916, Barclays extended its branch network by making acquisitions of small English banks. Further expansion followed in 1918 when Barclays amalgamated with the London, Provincial and South Western Bank, and in 1919, when the British Linen Bank was acquired by Barclays, although the British Linen Bank retained a separate board of directors and continued to issue its own banknotes (see Banknotes of the pound sterling).

In 1925, the Colonial Bank, National Bank of South Africa and the Anglo-Egyptian Bank were amalgamated and Barclays operated its overseas operations under the name Barclays Bank (Dominion, Colonial and Overseas)—Barclays DCO. In 1938, Barclays acquired the first Indian exchange bank, the Central Exchange Bank of India, which had opened in London in 1936 with the sponsorship of the Central Bank of India.

In 1941, during the German occupation of France, a branch of Barclays in Paris, headed by Marcel Cheradame, worked directly with the invading force. Senior officials at the bank volunteered the names of Jewish employees, as well as ceding an estimated one hundred Jewish bank accounts to the German occupiers. The Paris branch used its funds to increase the operational power of a large quarry that helped produce steel for the Germans. There was no evidence of contact between the head office in London and the branch in Paris during the occupation. Marcel Cheradame was kept as the branch manager until he retired in the sixties.

=== 1946 to 1980 ===
In May 1958, Barclays was the first UK bank to appoint a female bank manager. Hilda Harding managed Barclays' Hanover Square branch in London until her retirement in 1970.

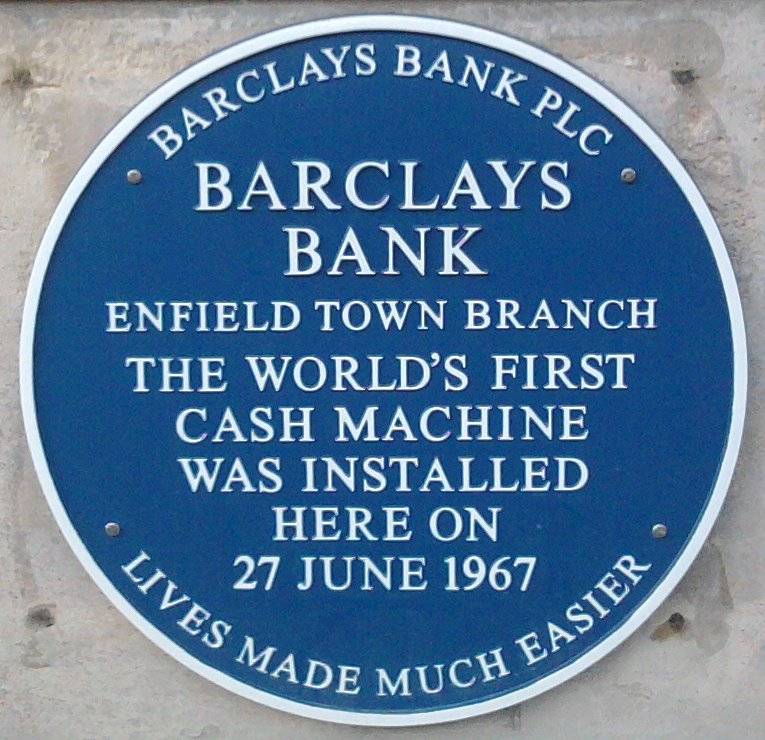
A plaque in Enfield, United Kingdom commemorating the installation of the world's first cash machine by Barclays in 1967

In 1965, Barclays established a US affiliate, Barclays Bank of California, in San Francisco.

Barclays launched the first credit card in the UK, Barclaycard, in 1966. On 27 June 1967, Barclays deployed the world's first cash machine, in Enfield; Barclays Bank, Enfield. The British actor Reg Varney was the first person to use the machine.

Barclays Bank D.C.O Act 1957
- Act of Parliament
- Parliament of the United Kingdom
- Long title: An Act to make provision respecting the articles or regulations for the government of Barclays Bank D.C.O. to make provision with respect to its general meetings to increase its authorised capital and for other purposes.
- Citation: 5 & 6 Eliz. 2. c. vii

Dates
- Royal assent: 6 June 1957
Other legislation
Repealed by	Barclays Bank Act 1984

Status: Repealed

Text of statute as originally enacted

In 1969, a planned merger with Martins Bank and Lloyds Bank was blocked by the Monopolies and Mergers Commission, but the acquisition of Martins Bank on its own was later permitted. Also that year, the British Linen Bank subsidiary was sold to the Bank of Scotland in exchange for a 25% stake, a transaction that became effective from 1971. Barclays DCO changed its name to Barclays Bank International in 1971.

From 1972 until 1980, a minority stake in Banca Barclays Castellini SpA, Milan was owned by the Castellini family. In 1980, Barclays Bank International acquired the remaining stake in Barclays Castellini from the Castellini family.

Barclays Bank International Act 1974
- Act of Parliament
- Parliament of the United Kingdom
- Long title: An Act to provide for the manner in which Barclays Bank International Limited may alter, revoke or add to its objects; and for other purposes.
- Citation: 1974 c. ix

Dates
- Royal assent: 23 May 1974
Other legislation
Repealed by	Barclays Bank Act 1984

Status: Repealed

Text of statute as originally enacted

In August 1975, following the secondary banking crash, Barclays acquired Mercantile Credit Company.

=== 1980 to 2000 ===
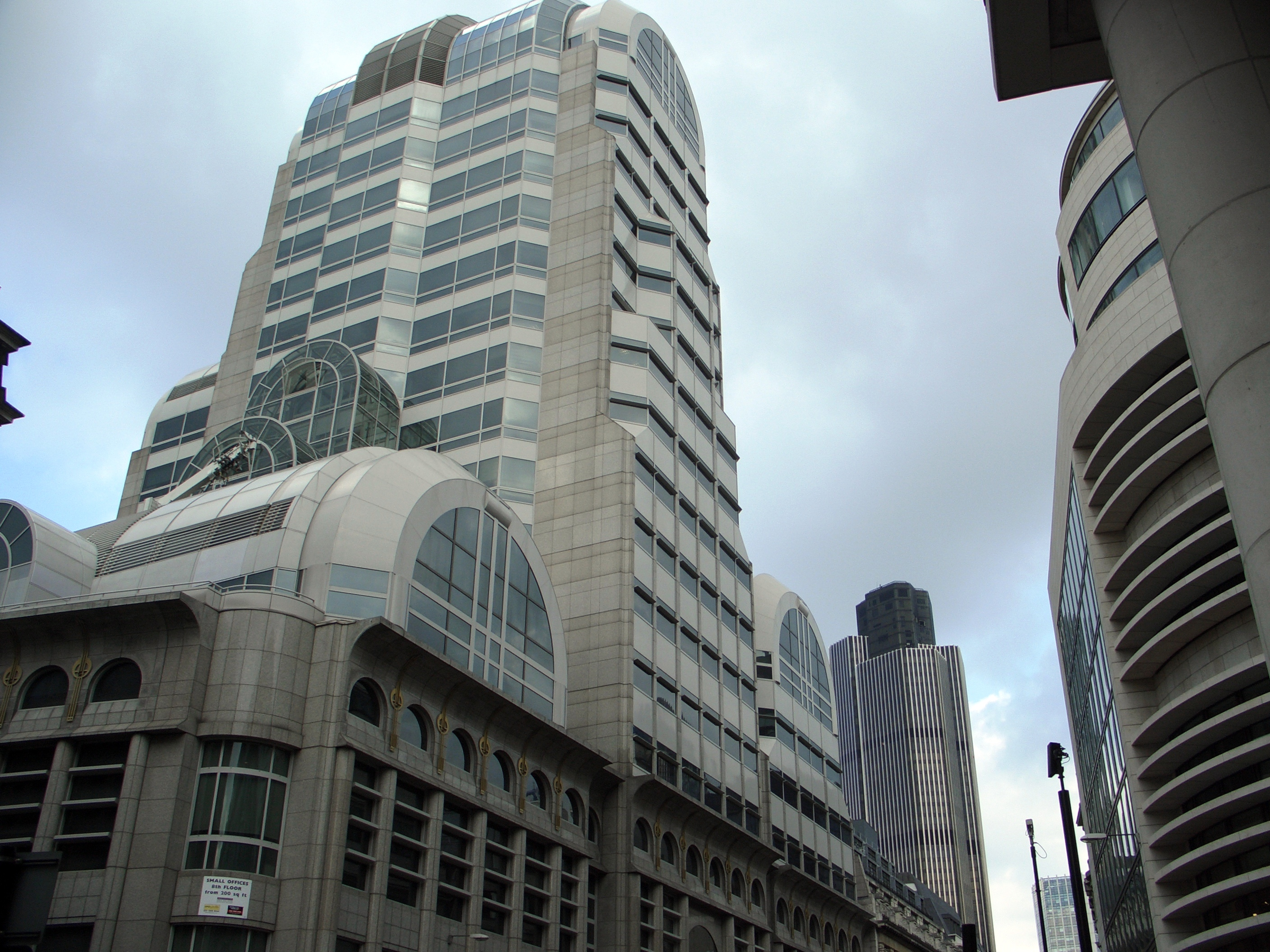
Barclays head office after reconstruction in 1992 on a design by GMW Architects, photographed in 2008 before subsequent remodelling

Barclays Bank International expanded its business in 1980 to include commercial credit and took over American Credit Corporation, renaming it Barclays American Corporation.

Barclays Bank Act 1984
- Act of Parliament
- Parliament of the United Kingdom
- Long title: An Act to provide for the reorganisation of the Barclays group of companies by the transfer to Barclays Bank International Limited of the undertaking of Barclays Bank PLC; and for other purposes.
- Citation: 1984 c. x

Dates
- Royal assent: 26 June 1984
Other legislation
Repeals/revokes	Barclays Bank D.C.O. Act 1957; Barclays Bank International Act 1974

Status: Current legislation

Text of statute as originally enacted

During 1985 Barclays Bank and Barclays Bank International merged, and as part of the corporate reorganisation the former Barclays Bank plc became a group holding company, renamed Barclays Group Plc, and UK retail banking was integrated under the former BBI, and renamed Barclays Bank PLC from Barclays Bank Limited.

In response to the Big Bang on the London Stock Exchange, in 1986 Barclays bought UK stockbroker de Zoete & Bevan and jobbing firm Wedd Durlacher (formerly Wedd Jefferson). They were merged with Barclays Merchant Bank to form Barclays de Zoete Wedd (BZW). Also that year Barclays sold its South African business operating under the Barclays National Bank name after protests against Barclays' involvement in South Africa and its apartheid government.

Barclays introduced the Connect card in June 1987, the first debit card in the United Kingdom.

In 1988, Barclays sold Barclays Bank of California, which at that time was the 17th-largest bank in California measured by assets, to Wells Fargo for US$125 million in cash.

Edgar Pearce, the "Mardi Gra Bomber", began a terror campaign against the bank and the supermarket chain Sainsbury's in 1994.

Barclays bought Wells Fargo Nikko Investment Advisors (WFNIA) in 1996 and merged it with BZW Investment Management to form Barclays Global Investors. Bob Diamond took charge of the investment banking businesses that year. 80% of Barclays's revenue came from UK retail and commercial banking at that time; Diamond's goal was to compete with US bulge-bracket investment banks, and the firm allowed him to do so despite Diamond's division losing hundreds of millions of pounds in the 1998 Russian financial crisis.

Two years later, in 1998, the BZW business was broken up and the Equity and Corporate Finance divisions were sold to Credit Suisse First Boston: Barclays retained the debt-focused Fixed Income business and Structured Capital Markets which formed the foundation of the rebranded Barclays Capital (BarCap). Barclays Capital had offices in over 29 countries and employed over 20,000 people, with over 7,000 people working in its IT division.

In 1998, Barclays Bank agreed to pay $3.6m to Jews whose assets were seized from French branches of the British-based bank during World War II. Barclays, along with seven French banks, was named in a lawsuit filed in New York on behalf of Jews who were unable to reclaim money they deposited during the Nazi era.

In an unusual move as part of the trend at the time for free ISPs, Barclays launched an Internet service provider in 1999 called Barclays.net. This entity was acquired by British Telecom in 2001.

In the 1990s, Barclays helped to fund President Robert Mugabe's government in Zimbabwe. The most controversial of a set of loans provided by Barclays was the £30 million it gave to help sustain land reforms that saw Mugabe seize white-owned farmland and drive more than 100,000 black workers from their homes. Opponents have called the bank's involvement a "disgrace" and an "insult" to the millions who have suffered human rights abuses. A Barclays spokesman said the bank has had customers in Zimbabwe for decades and abandoning them now would make matters worse, "We are committed to continuing to provide a service to those customers in what is clearly a difficult operating environment". Barclays also provided bank accounts to two of Mugabe's associates, who were subject to European Union sanctions on Zimbabwe. The men are Elliot Manyika and minister of public service Nicholas Goche. Barclays has defended its position by insisting that the EU rules do not apply to its 67%-owned Zimbabwean subsidiary because it was incorporated outside the EU.

=== 2000 to 2010 ===
In August 2000, Barclays took over the recently de-mutualised Woolwich Building Society, in a £5.4 billion acquisition. Woolwich thus joined the Barclays group of companies, and the Woolwich name was retained after the acquisition. The company's head office remained in Bexleyheath, south-east London, four miles (6 km) from the original head office in Woolwich.

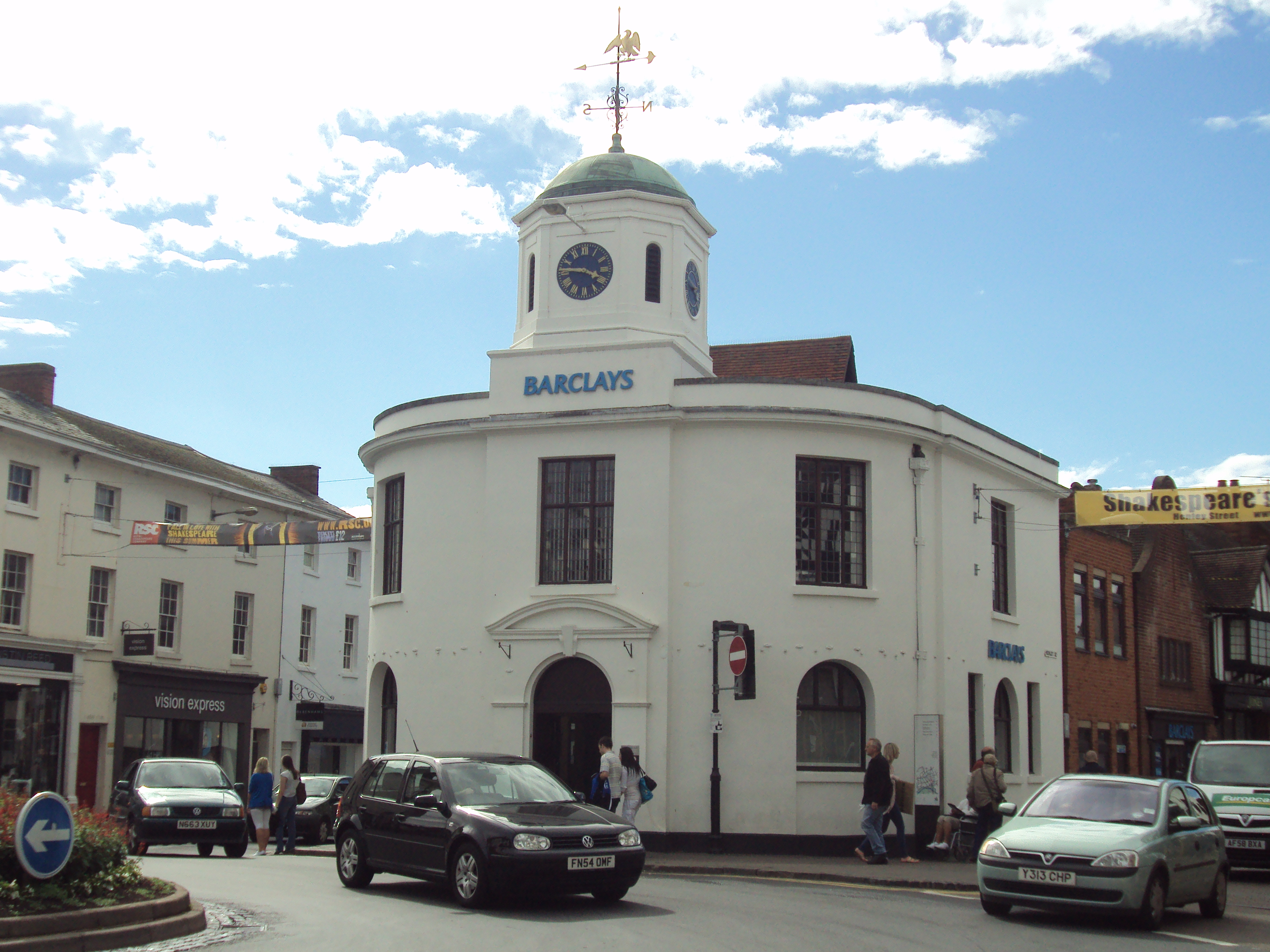
A Barclays branch in Stratford-upon-Avon, United Kingdom

Barclays closed 171 branches in the UK in 2001, many of them in rural communities: Barclays called itself "The Big Bank", but this name was quickly given a low profile after a series of embarrassing PR stunts.

On 31 October 2001, Barclays and CIBC agreed to combine their Caribbean operations to establish a joint venture company known as FirstCaribbean International Bank (FCIB).

In 2003, Barclays bought the American credit card company Juniper Bank from CIBC, re-branding it as "Barclays Bank Delaware". The same year saw the acquisition of Banco Zaragozano, the 11th-largest Spanish bank.

In May 2005, Barclays moved its group headquarters from Lombard Street in the City of London to One Churchill Place in Canary Wharf. Also in 2005 Barclays sealed a £2.6bn takeover of Absa Group Limited, South Africa's largest retail bank, acquiring a 54% stake on 27 July 2005.

In 2006, Barclays purchased the HomEq Servicing Corporation for US$469 million in cash from Wachovia Corp. That year also saw the acquisition of the financial website CompareTheLoan and Barclays announcing plans to rebrand Woolwich branches as Barclays, migrating Woolwich customers onto Barclays accounts and migrating back-office processes onto Barclays systems—the Woolwich brand was to be used for Barclays mortgages. Barclays also exited retail-banking operations in the Caribbean-region which extended as far back as 1837 through selling of its joint venture stake in FirstCaribbean International Bank (FCIB) to CIBC for between $989 million and $1.08 billion.

In March 2007, Barclays announced plans to purchase ABN AMRO, the largest bank in the Netherlands. However, on 5 October 2007 Barclays announced that it had abandoned its bid, citing inadequate support by ABN shareholders. Fewer than 80% of shares had been tendered to Barclays' cash-and-shares offer. This left the consortium led by Royal Bank of Scotland Group free to proceed with its counter-bid for ABN AMRO.

Also in 2007, Barclays agreed to purchase Equifirst Corporation from Regions Financial Corporation for US$225 million. That year also saw Barclays Personal Investment Management announcing the closure of their operation in Peterborough and its re-siting to Glasgow, laying off nearly 900 members of staff.

On 30 August 2007, Barclays borrowed £1.6 billion (US$3.2 billion) from the Bank of England sterling standby facility. Despite rumours about liquidity at Barclays, the loan was necessary due to a technical problem with their computerised settlement network. A Barclays spokesman was quoted as saying "There are no liquidity issues in the U.K markets. Barclays itself is flush with liquidity."

On 9 November 2007, Barclays shares dropped 9% and were even temporarily suspended for a short period of time, due to rumours of a £4.8 billion (US$10 billion) exposure to bad debts in the US. However, a Barclays spokesman denied the rumours.

In February 2008, Barclays bought the credit card brand Goldfish for US$70 million gaining 1.7 million customers, and US$3.9 billion in receivables. Barclays also bought a controlling stake in the Russian retail bank Expobank for US$745 million. Later in the year Barclays commenced its Pakistan operations with initial funding of US$100 million.

During the 2008 financial crisis, Barclays sought to raise capital privately, avoiding direct equity investment from the UK government, which was offered to boost its capital ratio. Barclays believed that "maintaining its independence from government was in the best interests of its shareholders".

In July 2008, Barclays raised £4.5 billion through a rights issue to shore up its Tier 1 capital ratio, which involved a rights offer to existing shareholders and the sale of a stake to Sumitomo Mitsui Banking Corporation. Only 19% of shareholders took up their rights leaving investors China Development Bank and Qatar Investment Authority with increased holdings in the bank.

Reuters reported in October 2008 that the British government would inject £40 billion (US$69 billion) into three banks including Barclays, which might seek over £7 billion. Barclays later confirmed that it rejected the Government's offer and would instead raise £6.5 billion of new capital (£2 billion by cancellation of dividend and £4.5 billion from private investors).

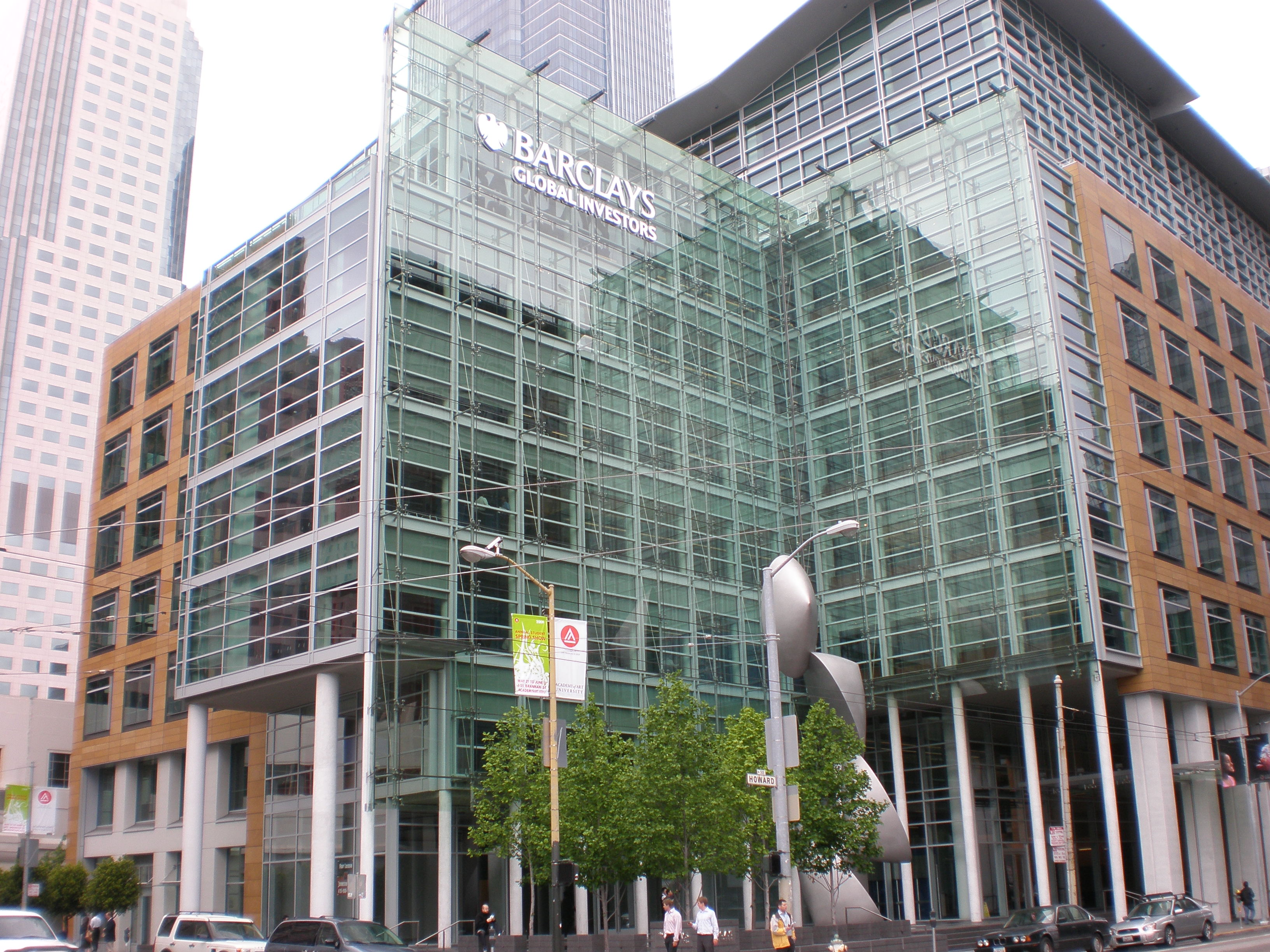
The former headquarters of Barclays Global Investors in San Francisco, United States. Barclays sold Barclays Global Investors to BlackRock in 2009.

On 12 June 2009, Barclays sold its Global Investors unit, which included its exchange-traded fund business, iShares, to BlackRock for US$13.5 billion. Standard Life sold Standard Life Bank to Barclays in October 2009. The sale was completed on 1 January 2010. Barclays sold its Retail Banking unit in Spain to CaixaBank in 2014. With the sale, Caixabank acquired around 550,000 new retail and private banking clients and 2,400 employees.

In March 2009, Barclays was accused of violating international anti-money laundering laws. According to the NGO Global Witness, the Paris branch of Barclays held the account of Equatorial Guinean President Teodoro Obiang's son, Teodorin Obiang, even after evidence that Obiang had siphoned oil revenues from government funds emerged in 2004. According to Global Witness, Obiang purchased a Ferrari and maintains a mansion in Malibu with the funds from this account.

In March 2009, Barclays obtained an injunction against The Guardian requiring it to remove from its website confidential leaked documents describing how SCM, Barclays' structured capital markets division, planned to use more than £11 billion of loans to create hundreds of millions of pounds of tax benefits, via "an elaborate circuit of Cayman Islands companies, US partnerships and Luxembourg subsidiaries". In an editorial on the issue, The Guardian pointed out that, due to the mismatch of resources, tax-collectors (HMRC) now have to rely on websites such as WikiLeaks to obtain such documents. Separately, another Barclays whistleblower revealed several days later that the SCM transactions had produced between £900 million and £1 billion in tax avoidance in one year, adding that "The deals start with tax and then commercial purpose is added to them."

A 2010 report by The Wall Street Journal described how Credit Suisse, Barclays, Lloyds Banking Group, and other banks were involved in helping the Alavi Foundation, Bank Melli, the Iranian government, and/or others circumvent US laws banning financial transactions with certain states. They did this by "stripping" information out of wire transfers, thereby concealing the source of funds. Barclays settled with the government for US$298 million.

In February 2012, Barclays was ordered by the Treasury to pay £500 million in tax which it had tried to avoid. Barclays was accused by HMRC of designing two schemes that were intended to avoid substantial amounts of tax. Tax rules had required the bank to tell the UK authorities about its plans.

In October 2012 Barclays announced it had agreed to buy the ING Direct UK business of the ING Group. The transfer of the business to Barclays was approved at the High Court on 20 February 2013 and ING Direct was renamed Barclays Direct and would be integrated into the existing Barclays business within two years.

==== "Double Dip" tax scams ====
On 30 June 2006, The Wall Street Journal ran a front page, column one, article detailing how Barclays Capital was making a giant portion of its income not through legitimate investment banking activities but through a tax dodge. The so-called "double dip" was a highly lucrative, cross-border tax avoidance strategy that exploited differences in how the UK and US tax systems treated specific investments, allowing Barclays and its American partner banks to both claim the same tax credits for a single income tax payment. In a "Double Dip", Barclays and an American bank would loan, for example, an airline funds for the purchase of a jumbo jet. A subsidiary without any employees would be set up owned by Barclays and the American bank to handle the transaction, and the subsidiary would pay tax on the income on the loan in Britain. Both Barclays and its American partner banks would then claim the same full tax credit amount with their respective national tax authorities, resulting in Barclays' avoiding paying any income tax on the transaction without the respective tax authorities recognizing the "double dip". Barclays was making over £1 billion a year from the practice. This practice ended after The Wall Street Journal published an exposé of the scam in a front page, column one, article on 30 June 2006 by Carrick Mollenkamp, which ensured that Parliament, the Bank of England, and the UK Inland Revenue and the American Internal Revenue Service would learn of it. The practice was subsequently outlawed, resulting in Bob Diamond being branded "the unacceptable face of banking" by Peter Mandelson, UK Business Secretary

==== Lehman Brothers acquisition ====
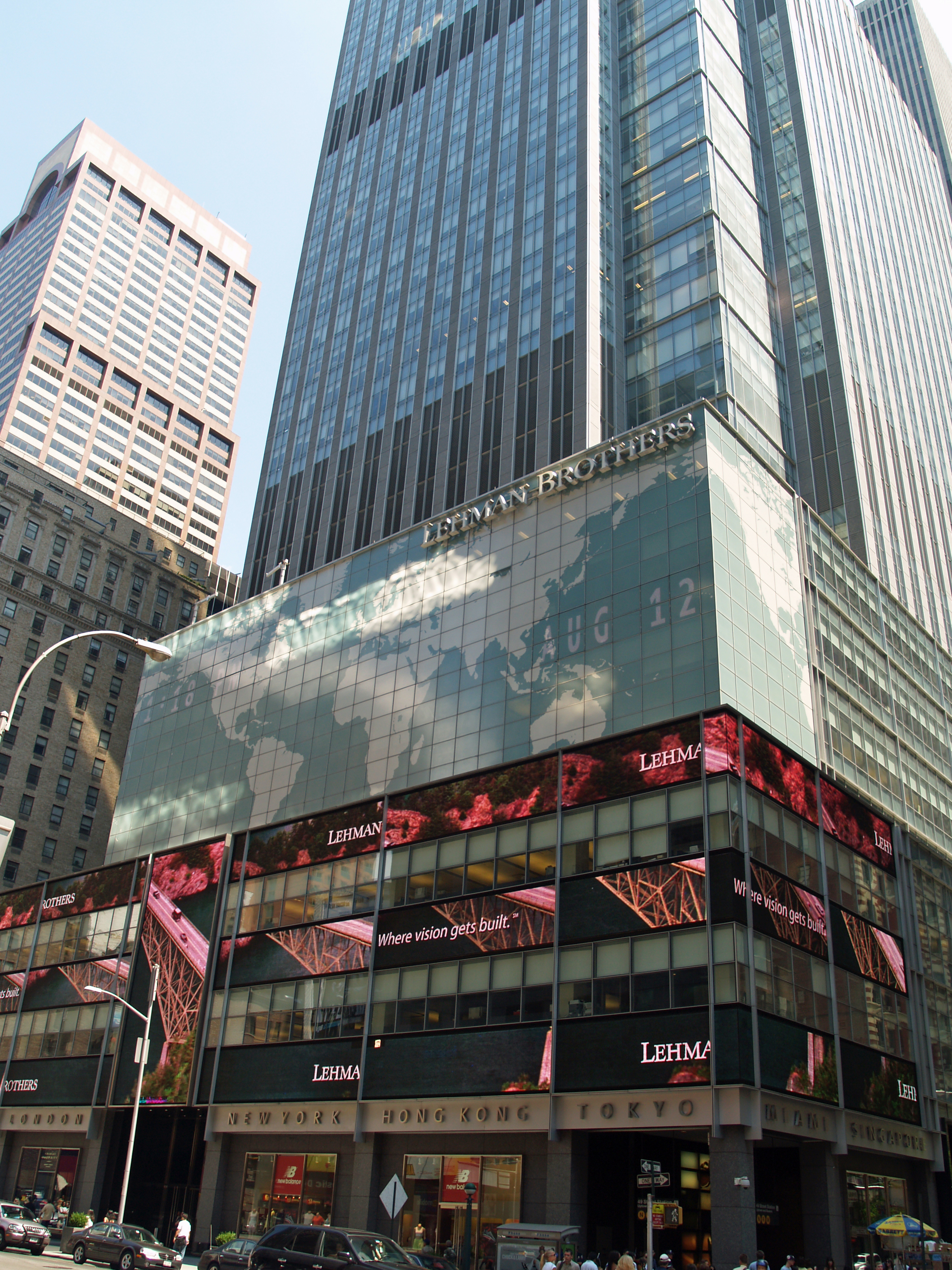
The former headquarters of Lehman Brothers in New York City, now owned by Barclays

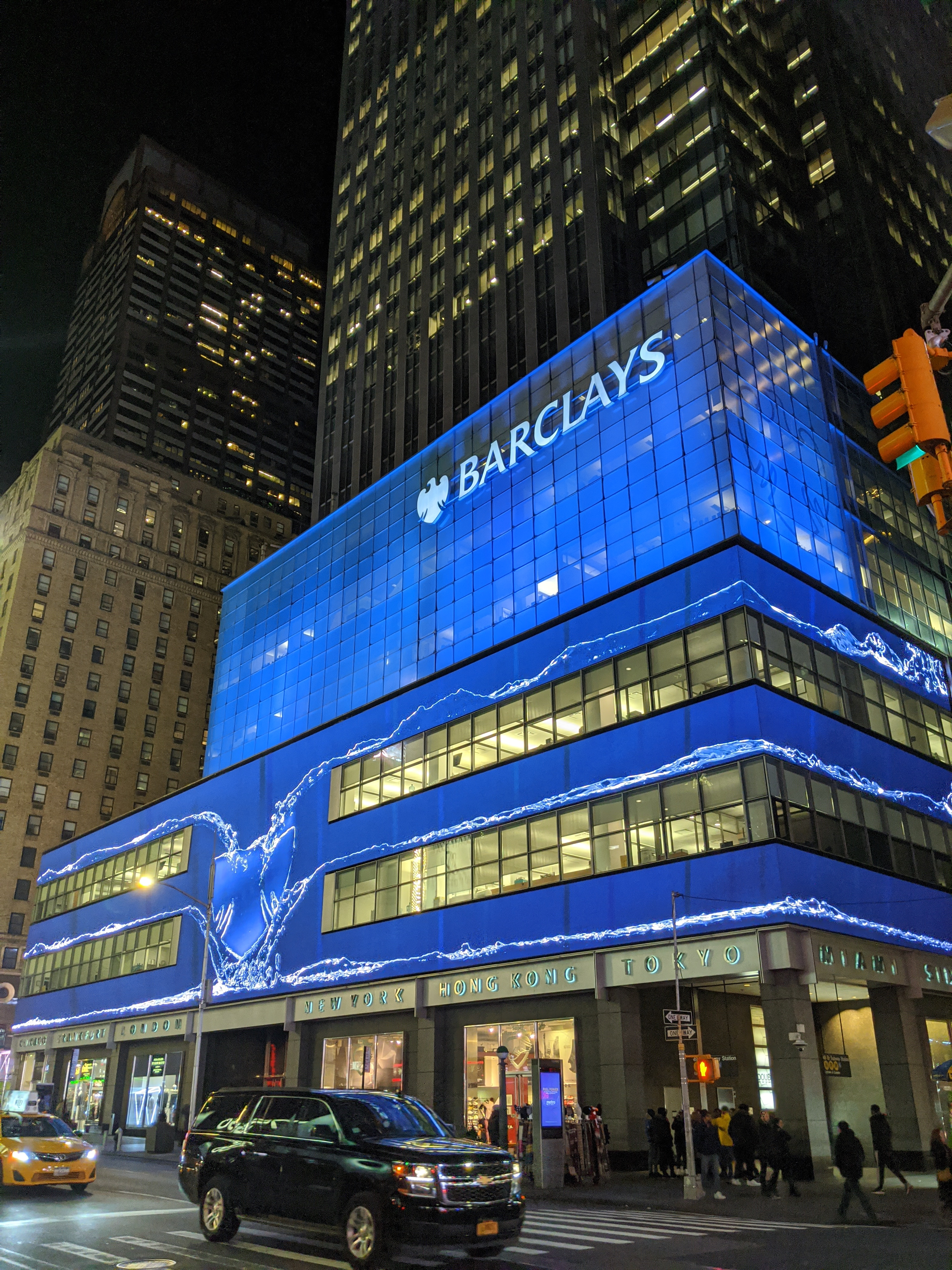
The New York building at night

On 16 September 2008, Barclays announced its agreement to purchase, subject to regulatory approval, the investment-banking and trading divisions of Lehman Brothers (including its former headquarters at 745 Seventh Avenue). Bob Diamond led the effort, securing Barclays a presence in U.S. Equities and Investment Banking. With Lehman, he and Barclays would achieve their goal of joining the bulge bracket.

On 20 September 2008, a revised version of the deal, a US$1.35 billion (£700 million) plan for Barclays to acquire the core business of Lehman Brothers (mainly Lehman's US$960 million Midtown Manhattan office skyscraper, with responsibility for 9,000 former employees), was approved. After a seven-hour hearing, New York bankruptcy court Judge James Peck ruled:

I have to approve this transaction because it is the only available transaction. Lehman Brothers became a victim, in effect the only true icon to fall in a tsunami that has befallen the credit markets. This is the most momentous bankruptcy hearing I've ever sat through. It can never be deemed precedent for future cases. It's hard for me to imagine a similar emergency.

In the amended agreement, Barclays would absorb US$47.4 billion in securities and assume US$45.5 billion in trading liabilities. Lehman's attorney Harvey R. Miller of Weil, Gotshal & Manges, said "the purchase price for the real estate components of the deal would be US$1.29 billion, including US$960 million for Lehman's New York headquarters and US$330 million for two New Jersey data centres. Lehman's original estimate valued its headquarters at US$1.02 billion but an appraisal from CB Richard Ellis this week valued it at US$900 million." Further, Barclays will not acquire Lehman's Eagle Energy unit, but will have entities known as Lehman Brothers Canada Inc, Lehman Brothers Sudamerica, Lehman Brothers Uruguay and its Private Investment Management business for high-net-worth individuals. Finally, Lehman will retain US$20 billion of securities assets in Lehman Brothers Inc that are not being transferred to Barclays. Barclays had a potential liability of US$2.5 billion to be paid as severance, if it chooses not to retain some Lehman employees beyond the guaranteed 90 days. The job of integration was given to Barclays' Rich Ricci.

In September 2014, Barclays was ordered to pay $15 million in settlement charges that alleged the bank had failed to maintain an adequate internal compliance system after its acquisition of Lehman Brothers during the 2008 financial crisis.

==== Qatar capital raising ====
Barclays launched a further round of capital raising, approved by special resolution on 24 November 2008, as part of its overall plan to achieve higher capital targets set by the UK's Financial Services Authority to ensure it would remain independent. Barclays raised £7 billion from investors from Abu Dhabi and Qatar. Existing Barclays shareholders complained they were not offered full pre-emption rights in this round of capital raising, even threatening to revolt at the extraordinary meeting. Sheikh Mansour and Qatar Holding agreed to open up £500 million of their new holdings of reserve capital instruments for clawback. Existing investors now took this up.

In January 2009, the press reported that further capital may be required and that while the government might be willing to fund this, it may be unable to do so because the previous capital investment from the Qatari state was subject to a proviso that no third party might put in further money without the Qataris receiving compensation at the value the shares had commanded in October 2008. In March 2009, it was reported that in 2008, Barclays received billions of dollars from its insurance arrangements with AIG, including US$8.5 billion from funds provided by the United States to bail out AIG.

Barclays' share price fell 54% in June 2009 after the International Petroleum Investment Company (IPIC), which had invested up to £4.75 billion in November 2008, sold 1.3 billion Barclays shares. Qatar Holding sold a 3.5% stake worth £10 billion in October 2009, and a further sale of warrants worth around £750 million in November 2012, but remained one of the bank's largest shareholders. In July 2012, Barclays revealed that the FSA was investigating whether the bank adequately disclosed fees paid to Qatar Investment Authority. In August 2012, the Serious Fraud Office announced an investigation into the Middle East capital raising. The Financial Services Authority announced an expansion of the investigation into the Barclays-Qatar deal in January 2013, focusing on the disclosure surrounding the ownership of the securities in the bank.

In October 2012, the United States Department of Justice and the US Securities and Exchange Commission informed Barclays they had commenced an investigation into whether the group's relationships with third parties who assist Barclays to win or retain business are compliant with the US Foreign Corrupt Practices Act.

==== Rate-fixing scandal ====
In June 2012, as a result of an international investigation, Barclays Bank was fined a total of £290 million (US$450 million) for manipulating the daily settings of London Interbank Offered Rate (Libor) and the Euro Interbank Offered Rate (Euribor). The United States Department of Justice and Barclays officially agreed that "the manipulation of the submissions affected the fixed rates on some occasions". The bank was found to have made 'inappropriate submissions' of rates which formed part of the Libor and Euribor setting processes, sometimes to make a profit, and other times to make the bank look more secure during the 2008 financial crisis. This happened between 2005 and 2009, as often as daily.

The BBC said revelations concerning the fraud were "greeted with almost universal astonishment in the banking industry." The UK's Financial Services Authority (FSA), which levied a fine of £59.5 million ($92.7 million), gave Barclays the biggest fine it had ever imposed in its history. The FSA's director of enforcement described Barclays' behaviour as "completely unacceptable", adding "Libor is an incredibly important benchmark reference rate, and it is relied on for many, many hundreds of thousands of contracts all over the world." The bank's chief executive Bob Diamond decided to give up his bonus as a result of the fine. Liberal Democrat politician Lord Oakeshott criticised Diamond, saying: "If he had any shame he would go. If the Barclays board has any backbone, they'll sack him." The US Department of Justice has also been involved, with "other financial institutions and individuals" under investigation.

On 2 July 2012, Marcus Agius resigned from the chairman position following the interest rate rigging scandal. On 3 July 2012, Bob Diamond resigned with immediate effect, leaving Marcus Agius to fill his post until a replacement is found. Within the space of a few hours, this was followed by the resignation of the Bank's chief operating officer, Jerry del Missier. Barclays subsequently announced that Antony Jenkins, its existing chief executive of Global Retail & Business Banking would become group chief executive on 30 August 2012. On 17 February 2014 the Serious Fraud Office charged three former bank employees with manipulating Libor rates between June 2005 and August 2007. Four employees were jailed in July 2016 for up to six-and-a-half years, with two others cleared after a retrial.

=== 2010 to 2020 ===
In July 2013, US energy regulator the Federal Energy Regulatory Commission (FERC) ordered Barclays to pay £299 million fine penalty for attempting to manipulate the electricity market in the US. The fine by FERC relates to allegations in December 2008.

In May 2014, the Financial Conduct Authority fined the bank £26 million over systems and controls failures, and conflict of interest in relation to the bank and its customers in connection to the gold fixing during the period 2004–2013, and for manipulation of the gold price on 28 June 2012.

In June 2014, the US state of New York filed a lawsuit against the bank alleging it defrauded and deceived investors with inaccurate marketing material about its unregulated trading system known as a dark pool. Specifically, the firm was accused of hiding the fact that Tradebot participated in the dark pool when they were in fact one of the largest players. The state, in its complaint, said it was being assisted by former Barclays executives and it was seeking unspecified damages. The bank's shares dropped 5% on news of the lawsuit, prompting an announcement to the London Stock Exchange by the bank saying it was taking the allegations seriously, and was co-operating with the New York attorney general.

A month later the bank filed a motion for the suit to be dismissed, saying there had been no fraud, no victims and no harm to anyone. The New York Attorney General's office issued a statement saying the attorney general was confident the motion would fail. On 31 January 2016, Barclays settled with both the New York Attorney General's office and the SEC, agreeing to pay $70 million split evenly between the SEC and New York state, admitting it violated securities laws and agreeing to install an independent monitor for the dark pool.

To ward off the effects of Brexit Barclays borrowed £6 billion from the Bank of England between April and June 2017, as part of a post-referendum stimulus package launched in August 2016. In August 2021 Barclays announced a $400 million capital infusion into its business in India, which was the single largest capital infusion into its Indian business in three decades.

Barclays agreed to pay $150 million to resolve an investigation by New York's banking regulator into a trading practice that allowed the bank to exploit a milliseconds-long lag between an order and its execution that sometimes hurt its clients.

Barclays announced in June 2015 that it would sell its US wealth and investment management business to Stifel for an undisclosed fee. The bank announced in May 2017 that it would sell £1.5 billion worth of shares of its Barclays Africa Group subsidiary as part of its strategy to refocus its business from Africa to the UK and US. In September 2017, Barclays sold off the last part of its retail banking segment on continental Europe after selling its French retail, wealth and investment management operations to AnaCap.

In June 2017, following a five-year investigation by the UK's Serious Fraud Office covering Barclays' activities during the 2008 financial crisis, former CEO John Varley and three former colleagues, Roger Jenkins, Thomas Kalaris and Richard Boath, were charged with conspiracy to commit fraud and the provision of unlawful financial assistance in connection with capital raising. The executives were cleared in February 2020.

In 2018, Barclays advised Invest Bank on a fundraising programme related to the Government of Sharjah's planned investment in the bank.

In February 2018, the Serious Fraud Office charged Barclays with "unlawful financial assistance" related to billions of pounds raised from the Qatar deal.

On 8 June 2020, Barclays was accused of deceit by a British firm PCP Capital. The company sued the bank in a £1.5 billion lawsuit, claiming that it had "deliberately misled" the market over the terms of its capital raising deal with Qatar. PCP alleged that Qatar Holdings was offered a "completely different" deal than that offered to Mansour bin Zayed Al Nahyan of Abu Dhabi, who according to Amanda Staveley was introduced to Barclays by PCP. However, during the hearing in the High Court of London, the Barclays lawyer, Jeffery Onions accused Staveley of "significantly exaggerating" her business relationship with the Abu Dhabi sheikh and of creating a "hustle" by getting involved in a crucial capital raising. Staveley and PCP Capital subsequently reduced the amount of their claim but lost the case in the High Court.

=== 2020 to present ===
In February 2020, it was reported that, in a pilot programme at its London headquarters, the company used tracking software to assess how long employees spent at their desks and warn them if they took excessive breaks. Staff who spent too much time away could find this mentioned on their daily report cards. Following criticisms by staff, the bank said it had taken steps to ensure that individual data would no longer be visible to managers, although the company still holds this data."

The bank faced similar privacy concerns in 2017 when it used OccupEye sensors to track staff through black boxes in their desks.

In September 2020 Barclays invested in Barrenjoey Capital Partners, an Australian investment bank startup. In May 2022 Barclays increased its stake in the firm from 9.9 percent to 18.2 percent.

On 31 October 2021, in a surprise move, group CEO Jes Staley agreed to step down amid investigation of his ties to the sex offender Jeffrey Epstein. He was replaced as group CEO by the Indian-born American banker C. S. Venkatakrishnan, who became the first person of Indian origin to lead Barclays.

In January 2022, François Baroin, mayor of Troyes, became chairman of the French subsidiary of Barclays Bank, where he had served as an adviser since 2018.

On 1 March 2023 Barclays acquired specialist mortgage lender, Kensington Mortgages. Kensington Mortgages, based in Maidenhead, has approximately 600 employees and originated £1.9bn of mortgages during the year ended 31 March 2022.

In July 2023, Arron Banks said that in 2018, Barclays closed his bank accounts, including business accounts, due to his political views, including his support for Brexit.

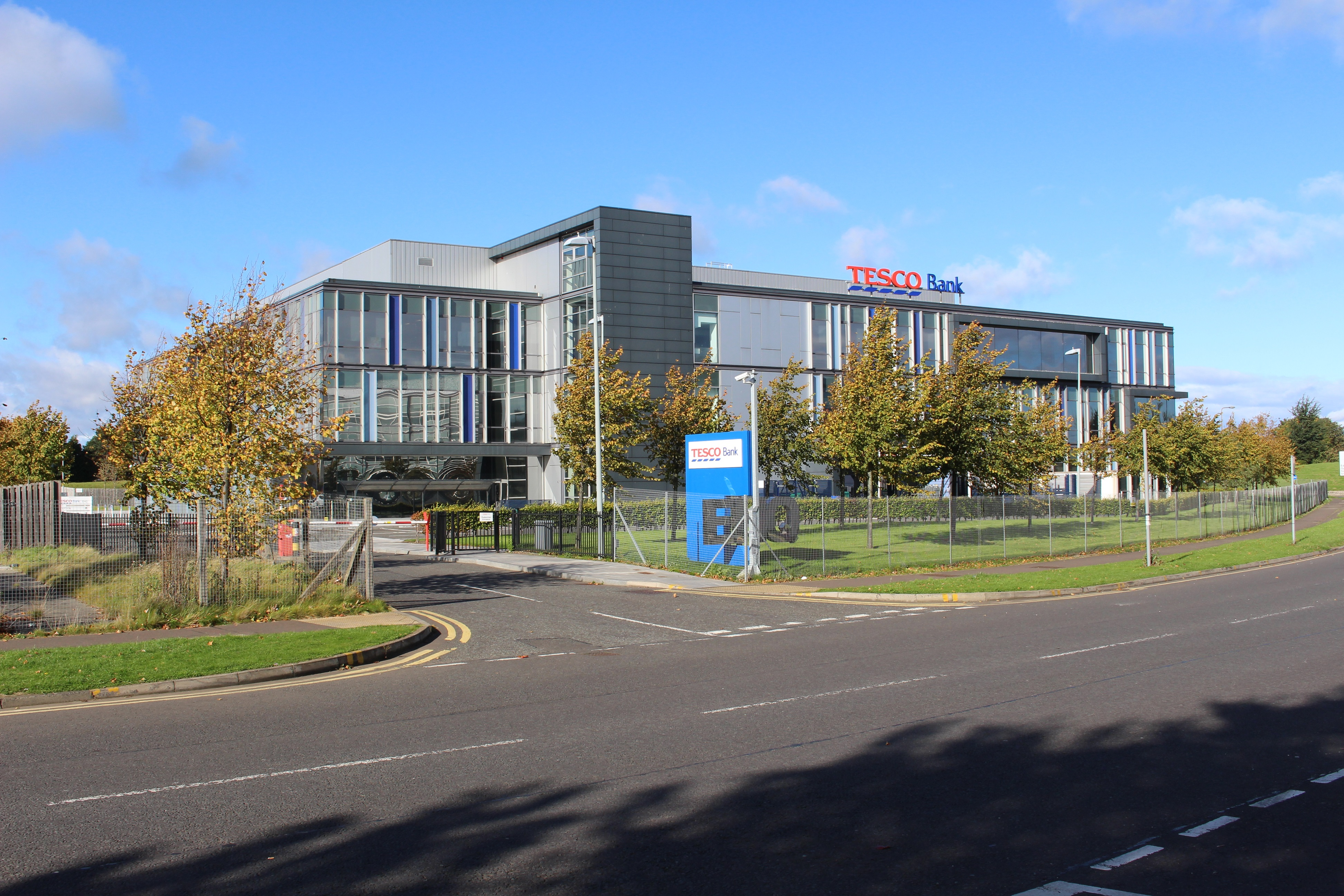
Offices of Tesco Bank in Edinburgh, which Barclays took over in 2024.

In February 2024, the bank announced the acquisition of Tesco Bank's credit cards, loans and savings operations, with Tesco retaining its insurance, ATMs, travel money and gift card operations. The transfer was effective from 1 November 2024.

In June 2024, coordinated protests by pro-Palestinian and climate activist groups vandalised Barclays branches across several UK cities, including London, Manchester, Bristol, Preston, Glasgow, Brighton, Exeter, Sheffield, Northampton, Birmingham, and Solihull. Around 20 branches were targeted, with red paint sprayed on buildings and glass windows smashed.

In July 2024, Barclays announced selling its German consumer finance business to Austrian bank BAWAG Group AG, following the sale of its performing Italian mortgage portfolio in April, as part of the British lender's aims to simplify its business and exit European retail banking outside of the UK.

According to a 2024 report by War on Want, Barclays has significantly increased its financial support to arms companies supplying weapons and military technology to Israel, raising its involvement by 55% since 2021. The bank holds over £2 billion in shares and provides £6.1 billion in loans and underwriting to nine such companies. Additionally, the report cited research from December 2023 that found that Barclays is Europe's sixth-largest creditor of firms operating in illegal Israeli settlements in the occupied West Bank. Barclays has denied investing its own money in weapons companies, stating that it only invests its clients' money and has affirmed its continued commitment to the State of Israel.

In January 2025, Apple had talks with Barclays and Synchrony Financial about replacing Goldman Sachs as Apple's credit card partner.

In early February 2025, Barclays experienced a significant IT glitch that disrupted online and mobile banking services for several days. The issue began on a Friday, coinciding with payday for many UK workers and the self-assessment tax return deadline. Customers reported being unable to access their accounts, view accurate balances, or confirm recent transactions. Barclays assured customers that ATMs and card payments were unaffected, allowing cash withdrawals and purchases.

In February 2025, The bank set aside £90 million to address potential compensation claims related to a car finance mis-selling scandal. This follows a Court of Appeal ruling that expanded the scope of the issue for lenders.

In March 2025, Barclays informed the Treasury Select Committee that it faced having to pay up to £12.5 million in compensation due to technical outages over the last two years. This disclosure followed Barclays' outage in late January disrupting over half of all its online payments. The bank expected to pay £5–7.5 million for that incident, plus £5 million for others since 2023.

In December 2025, it was reported that Barclays were one of the bidders in the £2.5 billion takeover battle for Evelyn Partners.

In June 2026, Barclays agreed to acquire youth banking platform GoHenry's UK business from Acorns for an undisclosed amount; Barclays stated that they intend to keep the GoHenry brand and standalone app.

In July 2026, it was announced that Barclays partnered with Samsung Electronics Co. to offer The Samsung Galaxy Card, a co-branded U.S. credit card to be issued by Barclays and operate on the Visa network.

In October 2026, five former Barclays traders had their convictions for rigging interest rates during the 2008 financial crisis overturned.

=== Environmental criticism ===
In 2017, Barclays faced protests by environmentalists because of its ownership of Third Energy Onshore which planned to extract natural gas using hydraulic fracturing (fracking) at Kirby Misperton in Yorkshire. Barclays later sold Third Energy in 2020 to Alpha Energy.

In 2020, the campaign group ShareAction filed a resolution at Barclays AGM because of its role as Europe's largest funder of fossil fuel companies. Barclays invested $85 billion in fossil fuel extraction and $24 billion in expansion.

=== Work from home policy ===
In September 2026, more than 1,000 staff signed a letter organised by Unite to exempt those living more than a 40 minute commute away from coming to the office three days a week. The current policy states thousands of full-time workers must be in the office two days a week.

== Operations ==
In February 2024, Group CEO, C.S. Venkatakrishnan outlined a plan to improve operational and financial performance and improve total shareholder returns by making Barclays simpler, better and more balanced.

As part of this strategy, Barclays was restructured into five divisions:

- UK Consumer Bank – Barclays UK, a ring-fenced UK retail bank (Barclays Bank UK PLC), is one of the UK's leading financial brands and includes personal and business banking operations, alongside Barclaycard UK.
- Barclays UK Corporate Bank – has a relationship with over a quarter of UK Corporates, providing the financial and advisory capabilities to power the UK's SME and mid-cap businesses.
- Barclays Private Bank and Wealth Management (PBWM) – comprises a UK wealth offering, offering a range of financial services, including Smart Investor, a digital investing service. The Private Bank is centred in the primary global wealth hubs, providing clients with a range of investing, banking and lending products alongside expert advice.
- Barclays Investment Bank – Global Markets and Investment Banking franchises, including international corporate banking, serving multinational corporate and institutional clients globally.
- Barclays US Consumer Bank – offers co-branded, small business and private label credit cards, instalment loans, online savings accounts, and CDs.

Until February 2024, Barclays operated as two divisions, Barclays UK (BUK) and Barclays International (BI), supported by a service company, Barclays Execution Services (BX).

- Barclays UK consists of UK Personal Banking, UK Business Banking and Barclaycard Consumer UK businesses, carried on by a UK ring-fenced bank (Barclays Bank UK PLC) and certain other entities within the Group.
- Barclays International consists of the "Investment Bank" and "Consumer, Cards and Payments" businesses, which are carried on by a nonring-fenced bank (Barclays Bank PLC) and its subsidiaries, as well as by certain other entities within the Group.

Barclays' technology centre in Prague develops software for the bank's global operations, including trading systems and tools for financial analysis and risk management. In 2025, it employed around 1,500 technology professionals.

=== Principal divisions and subsidiaries ===
Barclays' principal divisions and subsidiaries include:

- Barclaycard – global credit card business
- Barclays Bank plc – UK corporate bank
- Barclays Bank UK plc – UK retail bank
- Barclays Bank Delaware (formerly Barclaycard US, originally Juniper Bank, acquired 2003)
- Barclays Corporate
- Barclays Croatia
- Barclays Egypt
- Barclays Execution Services
- Barclays India
- Barclays Indonesia
- Barclays Investment Bank
- Barclays Bank Ireland – pan-EU entity created after Brexit
- Barclays Private Clients International – subsidiary based in the Isle of Man with branches in the Channel Islands
- Barclays Mauritius
- Barclays National Bank
- Barclays Pakistan
- Barclays Partner Finance
- Barclays Portugal (162 branches)
- Barclays Rise (fintech accelerator with locations in New York, London, Manchester, Vilnius(sold), Cape Town, Tel Aviv and Mumbai)
- Barclays Shared Services Chennai (India)
- Barclays Shared Services Noida (India)
- Barclays Technologies Centre China (closed)
- Barclays Technologies Centre India
- Barclays Technologies Centre Singapore (closed)
- Barclays Technologies Centre Lithuania (closed)
- Firstplus Financial Group plc
- Kensington Mortgages
- Barclays Private Bank

=== Finances ===
Year	2005	2006	2007	2008	2009	2010	2011	2012	2013	2014	2015
Total income (£ billions)	17.3	21.6	23.0	21.2	29.1	31.4	32.3	25.0	27.9	21.8	22.0
Attributable profit/(loss) (£ billions)	3.4	4.6	4.4	4.4	9.4	3.6	2.9	−0.6	0.5	−0.2	−0.4
Total assets (£ billions)	924	997	1,227	2,053	1,379	1,490	1,562	1,488	1,312	1,358	1,120
Employees (FTE)	113,300	122,600	134,900	152,800	144,200	147,500	141,100	139,200	139,600	132,300	129,400
Year	2016	2017	2018	2019	2020	2021	2022	2023	2024	2025	
Total income (£ billions)	21.5	21.1	21.1	21.6	21.8	21.9	25.0	25.4	26.8	29.1	
Attributable profit/(loss) (£ billions)	1.6	−1.7	1.6	2.5	1.5	6.2	5.0	4.3	5.3	6.2	
Total assets (£ billions)	1,213	1,133	1,133	1,140	1,350	1,384	1,514	1,477	1,518	1,544	
Employees (FTE)	119,300	79,900	83,500	80,800	83,000	81,600	87,400	92,400	93,000	93,000	

=== Branches and ATMs ===
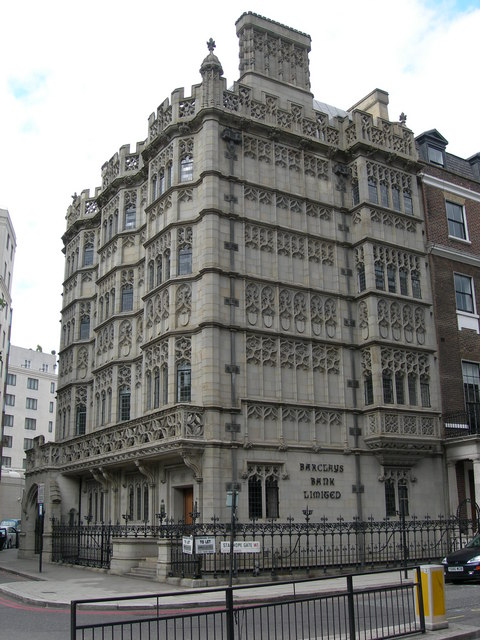
A Barclays branch on Park Lane in London, United Kingdom

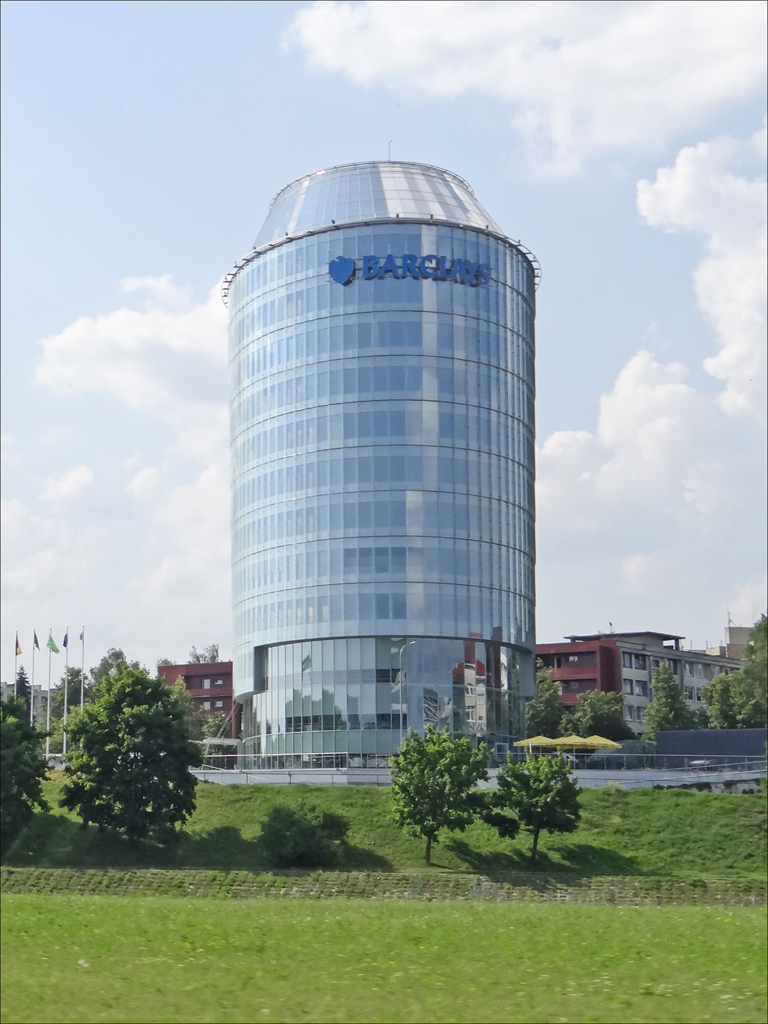
Former Barclays office in Vilnius, Lithuania

Barclays operates in over 40 countries, in the United Kingdom there are over 200 branches. In the UK, Barclays also offers some personal banking services through branches of the Post Office. Most Barclays branches have 24/7 ATMs. Barclays customers and the customers of many other banks can use Barclays ATMs for free in the UK, although in some other countries fees are charged. Barclays is a member of the Global ATM Alliance, an alliance of international banks which allows each banks' customers to use their ATM or debit card at all other member banks with no ATM access fees when travelling internationally.

=== Senior management ===
- Chairman: Nigel Higgins (since May 2019)
- Chief Executive: C. S. Venkatakrishnan (since November 2021)

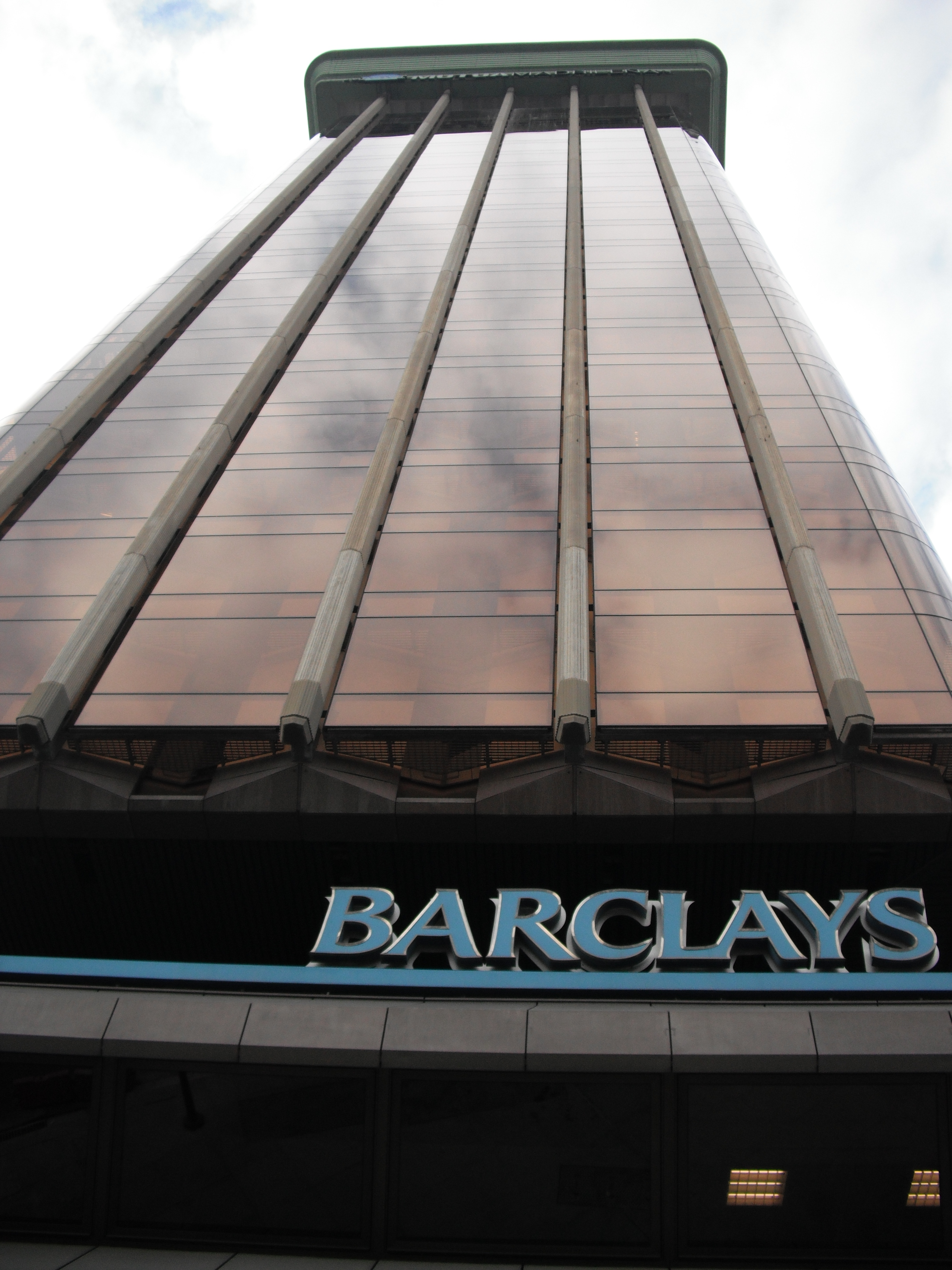
Former Madrid headquarters at Torres de Colón

==== List of former group chairmen ====
The position of group chairman was formed in 1896, along with the formation of Barclay and Company Limited.

- Francis Bevan (1896–1916)
- Frederick Goodenough (1917–1934)
- William Tuke (1934–1936)
- Edwin Fisher (1937–1946)
- Sir William Goodenough (1947–1951)
- Anthony Tuke (1951–1962)
- John Thomson (1962–1973)
- Sir Anthony Tuke (1973–1981)
- Sir Timothy Bevan (1981–1987)
- John Quinton (1987–1992)
- Andrew Buxton (1993–1999)
- Sir Peter Middleton (1999–2004)
- Matthew Barrett (2004–2007)
- Marcus Agius (2007–2012)
- Sir David Walker (2012–2015)
- John McFarlane (2015–2019)

==== List of former group chief executives ====
The position of group chief executive was formed in 1992; prior to that, the group chairman held executive authority over the group.

- Andrew Buxton (1992–1993)
- Martin Taylor (1994–1998)
- Sir Peter Middleton (1998–1999)
- Michael O'Neill (1999)
- Matthew Barrett (1999–2004)
- John Varley (2004–2010)
- Bob Diamond (2011–2012)
- Antony Jenkins (2012–2015)
- Jes Staley (2015–2021)

== Sponsorships ==
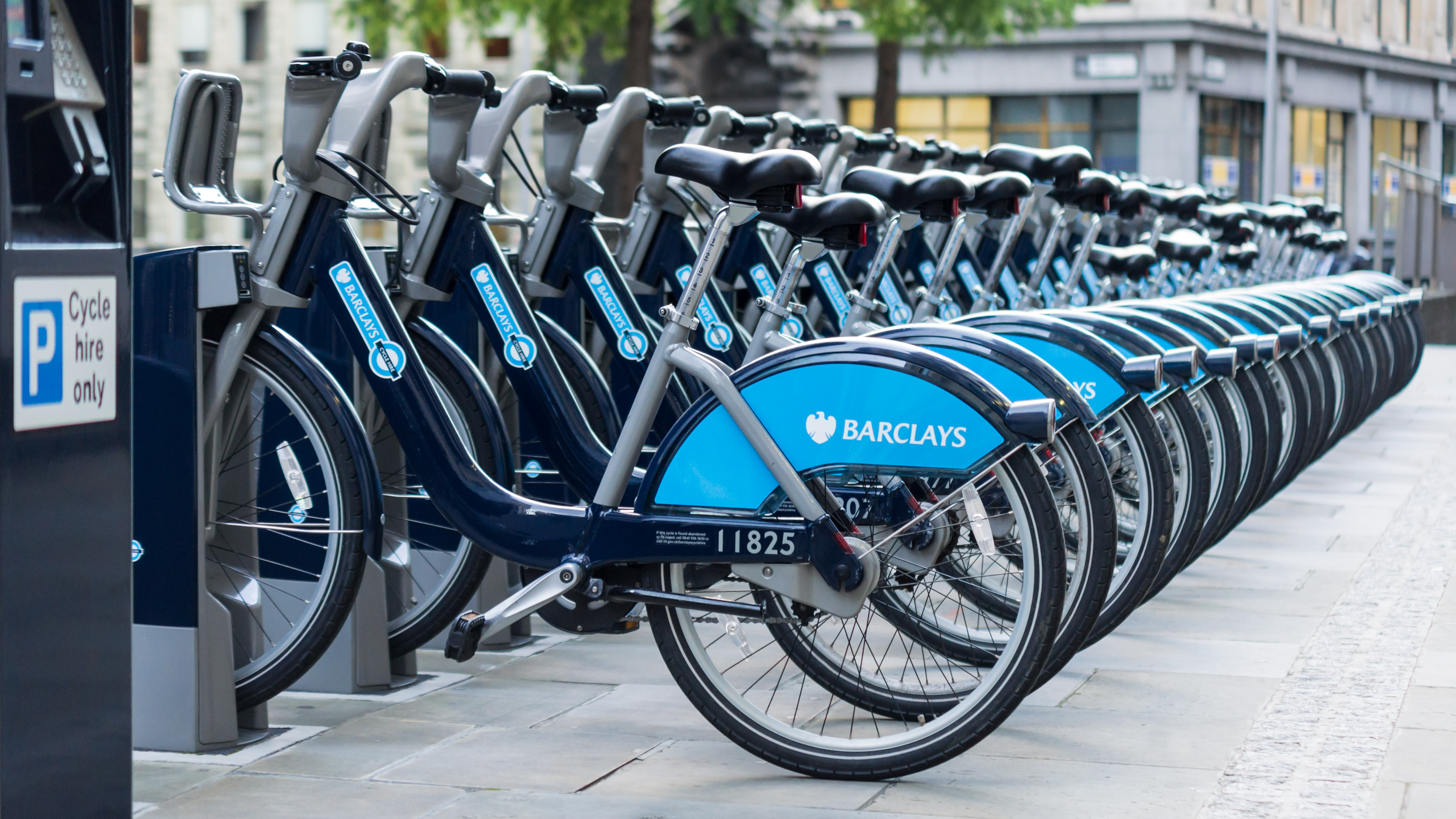
A Barclays Cycle Hire docking station in central London

Barclays was a long time title sponsor of the Premier League (as the FA Barclays Premiership and later Barclays Premier League) which started on the 2003–04 season and ended with 2015–16 season. Barclaycard previously sponsored the league (as the FA Barclaycard Premiership) from 2001 to 2004.

In 2007, Barclays agreed a 20-year naming rights agreement for $400 million for the Barclays Center in Brooklyn, New York City, home of the Brooklyn Nets and New York Liberty basketball teams. Two years later, due to the slump in the economy the deal was renegotiated to $200 million.

Barclays sponsored the 2008 Dubai Tennis Championships.

Barclays was the sponsor of the Barclays Cycle Hire scheme in London from its inception in 2010 to 2015, as part of a £25 million deal with Transport for London.

In December 2025, Barclays became the headline sponsor of Hampden Park, Scotland’s national stadium.

In February 2026, Barclays was signed as the official banking partner of Williams F1 Team.

== Coat of arms ==
The College of Arms granted arms to Barclays Bank Limited with the following blazoning:

Coat of arms of Barclays
Adopted 22 October 1937 Escutcheon Argent, an eagle displayed sable charged on the body and on each wing with a ducal coronet of the field.

== See also ==
- List of largest banks
- List of banks in the United Kingdom
