= Jean Louis Armand de Quatrefages de Bréau =

French biologist (1810–1892)

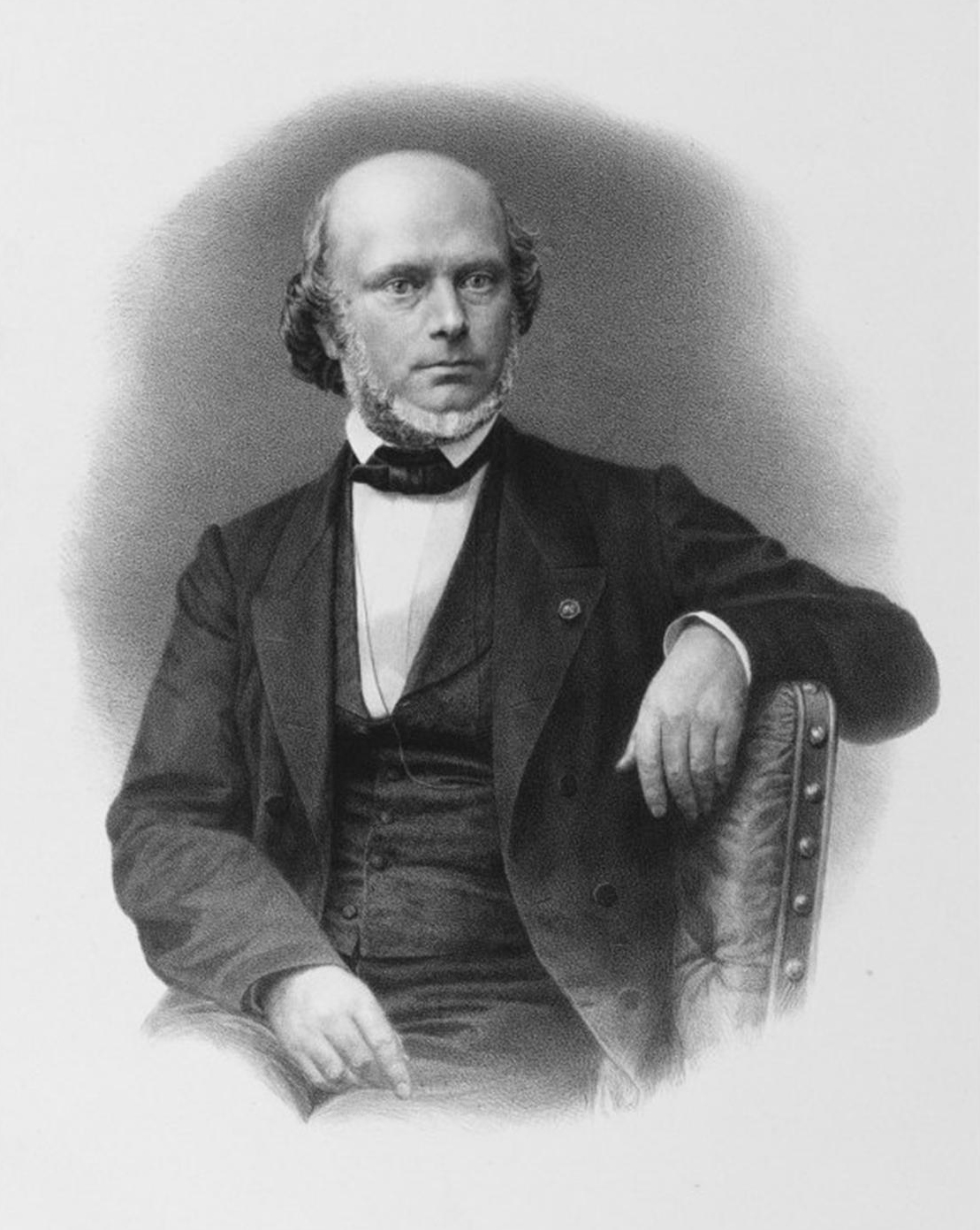
- Armand de Quatrefages
- Pronunciation: French pronunciation: [ʒɑ̃ lwi aʁmɑ̃ də katʁəfaʒ də bʁeo]
- Born: 10 February 1810; Berthézène, Valleraugue, Gard
- Died: 2 January 1892 (aged 81); Paris, France
- Scientific career
- Fields: Natural history
- Institutions: Lycée Napoléon; French Academy of Sciences; Museum National d'Histoire Naturelle; Royal Society of London
- Thesis: Considérations sur les caractères zoologiques des rongeurs et sur leur dentition en particulier (1840)
- Author abbrev. (zoology): Quatrefages

Jean Louis Armand de Quatrefages de Bréau (10 February 1810 – 12 January 1892) was a French physician, zoologist and anthropologist.

== Life ==
Quatrefages was born on 10 February 1810 in the French commune of Valleraugue, the son of a Protestant farmer. He studied science and then medicine at the University of Strasbourg, where he took the double degree of Doctor of Medicine and Doctor of Science, one of his theses being a Théorie d'un coup de canon (November 1829); next year he published a book, Sur les arolithes, and in 1832 a treatise on L'Extraversion de la vessie. Moving to Toulouse, he practised medicine for a short time, and contributed various memoirs to the local Journal de Médecine and to the Annales des sciences naturelles (1834–36). But being unable to continue his research in the provinces, he resigned the chair of zoology to which he had been appointed, and in 1839 settled in Paris, where he found in Henri Milne-Edwards a patron and a friend.

Elected professor of natural history at the Lycée Napoléon in 1850, he became a member of the French Academy of Sciences in 1852, and in 1855 was appointed to the chair of anthropology and ethnography at the Museum National d'Histoire Naturelle. Other distinctions followed rapidly, and continued to the end of his otherwise uneventful career, the more important being honorary member of the Royal Society of London (June 1879), member of the Institute and of the Academie de médecine, and commander of the Legion of Honor (1881). In 1891, he was elected an International Member of the American Philosophical Society. He died in Paris.

== Evolution ==
Quatrefages was critical of Charles Darwin's theories but was not anti-evolution. From 1859 he corresponded with Darwin regularly and although they disagreed with each other they stayed on friendly terms. Quatrefages authored Charles Darwin et ses précurseurs français (1870), which contained criticism of Darwinism. On receiving the book, Darwin in a letter to Quatrefages commented that "many of your strictures are severe enough, but all are given with perfect courtesy & fairness. I can truly say I would rather be criticised by you in this manner than praised by many others."

In 1870, Quatrefages and Henri Milne-Edwards nominated Darwin for election as a corresponding member of the French Academy of Sciences in the section of Anatomy and Zoology. This was met with strong opposition from Émile Blanchard, Charles-Philippe Robin and others. Darwin lost the election by a narrow margin.

In his book L'Espèce humaine (translated The Human Species, 1879) he disputed the role of natural selection in evolution. Quatrefages proposed that natural "elimination" would have been a more exact term as natural selection does not create new species.

Quatrefages was a strict monogenist and was an opponent of polygenism.

== Works ==
The work of de Quatrefages ranged over the whole field of zoology from the annelids and other low organisms to the anthropoids and man. Of his numerous essays in scientific periodicals, the more important were:

- Considérations sur les caractères zoologiques des rongeurs (1840)
- De l'organisation des animaux sans vertèbres des Côtes de la Manche (Ann. Sc. Nat., 1844)
- Recherches sur le système nerveux, l'embryognie, les organes des sens, et la circulation des annélides (Ibid., 1844–50)
- Sur les affinités et les analogies des lombrics et des sangsues (Ibid.)
- Sur l'histoire naturelle des tarets (Ibid., 1848–49)

Then there is the vast series issued under the general title of Etudes sur les types inférieurs de l'embranchement des annelés, and the results of several scientific expeditions to the Atlantic and Mediterranean coastlands, Italy and Sicily, forming a series of articles in the Revue des deux mondes, or embodied in the Souvenirs d'un naturaliste (2 vols., 1854).

These were followed in quick succession by the:

- Physiologie comparée, métamorphoses de l'homme et des animaux (1862)
- Les Polynésiens et leurs migrations (1866)
- Histoire naturelle des Annelés marins et d'eau douce (2 vols., 1866)
- La Rochelle et ses environs (1866)
- Rapport sur les progrés de l'anthropologie (1867)
- Charles Darwin et ses précurseurs francais (1870), a study of evolution in which the writer takes somewhat the same attitude as Alfred Russel Wallace, combating the Darwinian doctrine in its application to man
- La Race prussienne (1871)
- Crania Ethnica, jointly with Ernest Hamy (2 vols., with 100 plates, 1875–82), a classical work based on French and foreign anthropological data, analogous to the Crania of John Thurnam and Joseph Barnard Davis, and to Samuel George Morton's Crania Americana and Crania Aegyptiaca.
- L'Espèce humaine (1877)
- The Human Species (1879)
- Nouvelles études sur la distribution géographique des Négritos (1882)
- Hommes fossiles et hommes sauvages (1884)
- Histoire générale des races humaines (2 vols., 1886–89), the first volume being introductory, while the second attempts a complete classification of mankind.
- Les Pygmées: Avec 31 fig. intercalées dans le texte; Les Pygmées des anciens d'après la science moderne; negritos ou Pygmées asiatiques; Négrilles ou Pygmées africains; Hottentots et Boschismans (1887)
- Les émulés de Darwin (2 vols., 1894)

== Other sources ==
- Limoges, Camille (1981). "Quatrefages de Bréau, Jean Louis Armand de". Dictionary of scientific biography. Vol. 11. Charles Scribner's Sons.
- IDREF.fr (lengthy bibliography).
