= John Candler =

John Candler may refer to:

- John W. Candler (1828–1903), United States Representative from Massachusetts
- John Candler (abolitionist) (1787–1869), English abolitionist
- John Candler (cricketer) (1873–1942), English cricketer
- John Candler (diver) (born 1939), British Olympic diver
- John S. Candler (1861–1941), American judge and colonel of the Spanish–American War
