= Strays of York =

Public open spaces in York, England

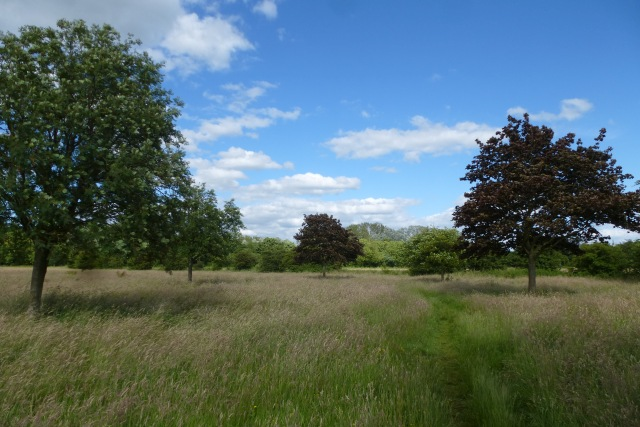
Walmgate Stray

The Strays of York is a collective name for four areas of open land, comprising in all over 800 acres (3.2 km^{2}), within the City of York. Their individual names are Bootham Stray, Micklegate Stray (which includes the Knavesmire and Hob Moor), Monk Stray and Walmgate Stray.

== History ==
The strays are the remains of much greater areas of common land on which the hereditary freemen of the city had, since time immemorial, the right to graze cattle.

After the Parliamentary Enclosures of the eighteenth and early nineteenth centuries, whereby commons were enclosed and rights of pasturage extinguished, areas of grazing land were allotted to the freemen in lieu of their existing rights. Together with the Knavesmire and Hob Moor, land already used by the City for pasturage, these areas became the strays, land vested in the corporation to be held in trust for the freemen of each of the original four wards of the city.

== Ownership and administration ==
York (Micklegate Strays) Act 1907
- Act of Parliament
- Parliament of the United Kingdom
- Long title: An Act to enable the Lord Mayor, Aldermen, and Citizens of the City of York to acquire the rights of the freemen and others in or in respect of certain lands or strays known as the Micklegate Strays, and to make provision for the management thereof, and for other purposes.
- Citation: 7 Edw. 7. c. clxxvi

Dates
- Royal assent: 28 August 1907

Originally, each Stray was controlled and managed by pasture masters for the exclusive benefit of the freemen resident in their ward. In 1905, the city took over Micklegate Stray, and the York (Micklegate Strays) Act 1907 (7 Edw. 7. c. clxxvi) extinguished the freemen's rights over it in exchange for the payment of an annual sum of money. In 1947, the city approached the pasture masters of the other three strays with a view to making similar arrangements in their cases. Agreements were signed with the freemen of Bootham Ward in that year, with the freemen of Walmgate Ward in 1948 and with the freemen of Monk Ward in 1958. In each case, the freemen agreed that, in exchange for a small annual payment to them, the city should in future administer their stray "as an open space for the benefit and enjoyment of the citizens of York for all time". Currently, the pasture masters are elected annually by the freemen of their wards, and are consulted by the city about major changes of usage. Their permission has to be obtained if the city wishes to erect any building on their stray other than those intended for the recreation or convenience of the public (sports pavilions, public lavatories, etc.). In 1995, payments were still being made to freemen of Micklegate Ward and their widows, but payments to freemen of the other wards had ceased.

== Bootham Stray ==
Bootham Stray (53.9843°N 1.0867°W) is located to the north of York city centre. Most of it lies on either side of Wigginton Road (B1363) between the Nestlé chocolate factory and the Bumper Castle pub. Technically, the Stray also includes narrow strips of land bordering on Wigginton Road up to and including Clarence Gardens at the junction with Haxby Road and Clarence Street, but much of this has either been built over or is used as the front gardens of houses. There was a nineteenth-century Herdsman's Cottage on the east side of the road near the level-crossing on the York-Scarborough railway line, but this was demolished in 1968.

== Micklegate Stray ==
Micklegate Stray (53.9446°N 1.0982°W) is to the south-west of the city centre and lies on either side of Tadcaster Road (A1036). The larger eastern section consists of the Knavesmire and a number of smaller areas to the north-east, including Scarcroft Park. To the west of Tadcaster Road is Hob Moor, although, because of the buildings on this side and the presence beyond them of the London to York railway line, the greater part of it is invisible from the road.

=== Knavesmire and Scarcroft area ===
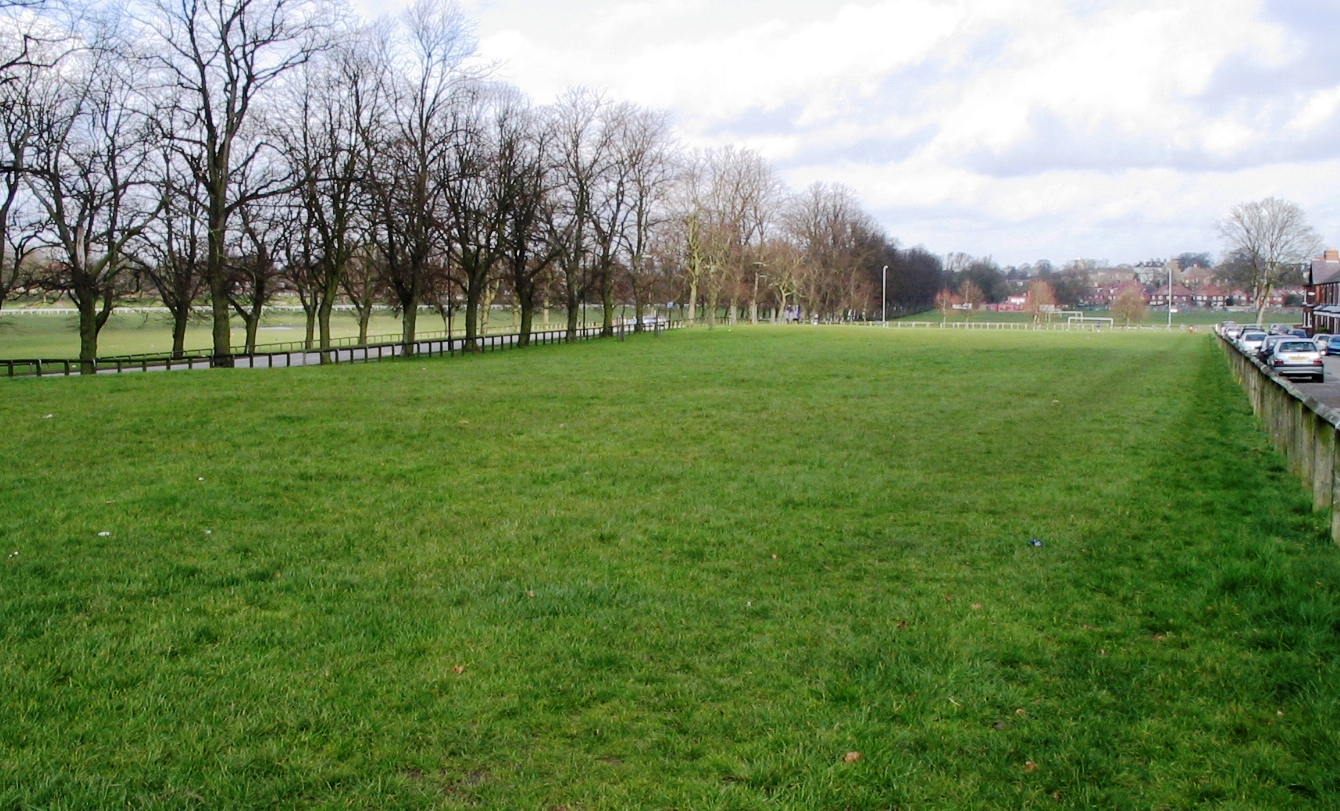
View of Knavesmire looking north from area near racecourse

Like Monk Stray and the northern end of Bootham Stray, the Knavesmire (53.9385°N 1.0973°W), containing York Racecourse, is clearly visible and immediately accessible from a main road. A quieter tree-lined public road, Knavesmire Road, runs across the Knavesmire from the cottage orné-style Herdsman's Cottage at the northern end to the South Bank area of York. South of the racecourse, National Route 65 of the National Cycle Network, the White Rose cycle route from Middlesbrough to Hull, York to Selby section, crosses the Knavesmire near Knavesmire Wood.

To the north-east, the Knavesmire's boundary is Albemarle Road. But there is a further part of Micklegate Stray between here and the City Walls. Much of it consists of allotments, but Scarcroft Park, accessible from the Walls via Scarcroft Lane, is a well-maintained open space with a bowling-green.

=== Hob Moor ===
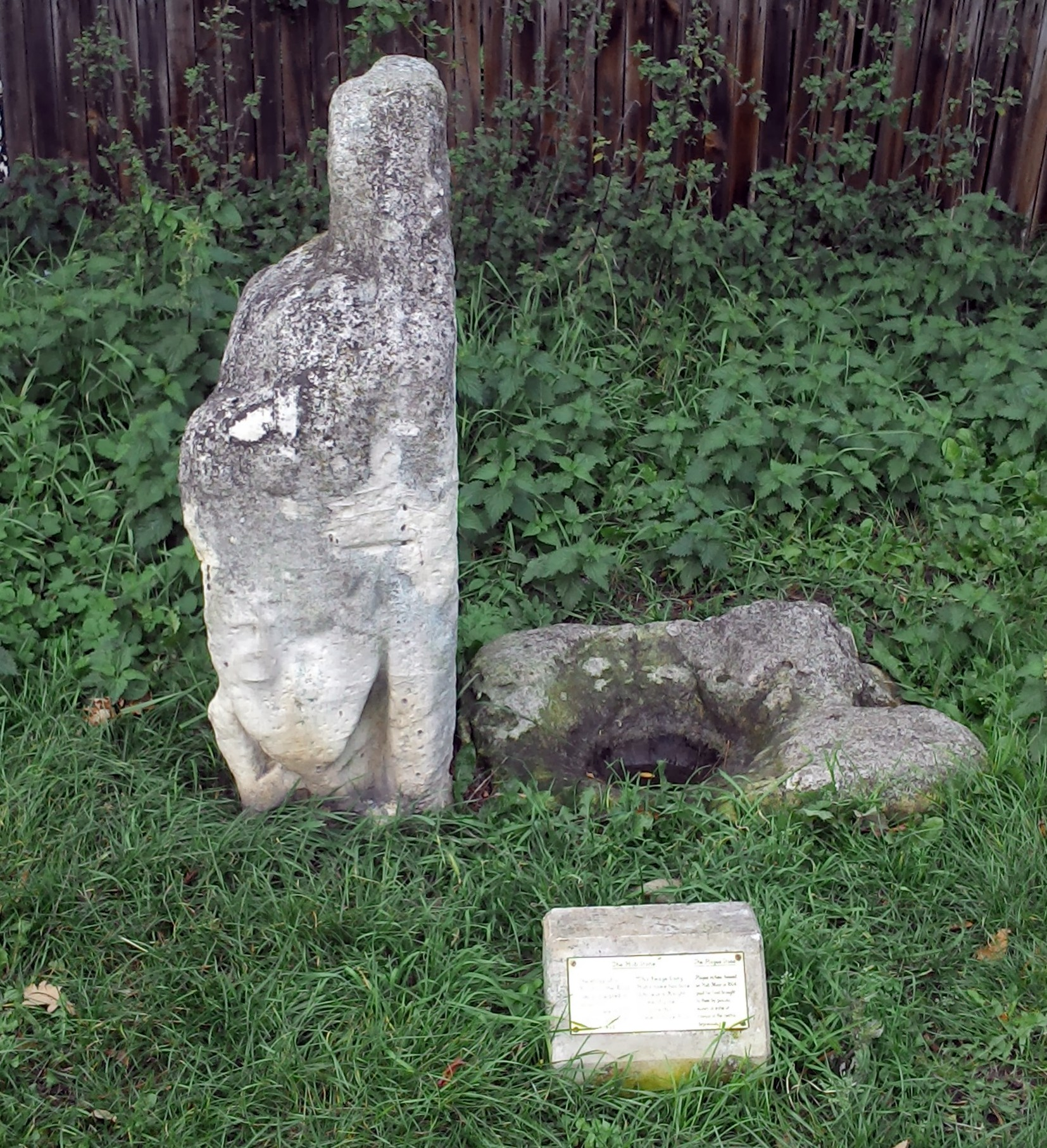
The Hob Stone and the Plague Stone between the Knavesmire and Hob Moor

Hob Moor (53.9466°N 1.1131°W) is a local nature reserve. It is an open space populated by cows, walkers and cyclists; it sometimes becomes waterlogged in wet weather. The main part of the Moor, to the west of the railway, is shaped rather like an inverted sweater, a body with two dangling arms. Two primary schools are located on the moor. A signposted cycle path crosses the Moor between the Knavesmire and Acomb.

Access from the Knavesmire and Tadcaster Road is via a path that passes some allotments and Hob's Stone, an upright 14th-century coffin-lid with a weathered effigy of a knight, accompanied by a flat stone and a basin. The latter was used as a Plague Stone in the seventeenth century: the basin was filled with vinegar, in which people washed coins in the mistaken belief that bubonic plague was transmitted via money.

Hob Moor can also be accessed from St Helen's Road/Thanet Road to the south, and from Green Lane and Hob Moor Drive/Holly Bank Road to the north.

== Monk Stray ==
Monk Stray lies (53.9812°N 1.0413°W) to the north-east of York on either side of Malton Road (A1036). It extends as a thin strip of land for about one and a half miles from Heworth Green to the Monk's Cross area in the parish of Heworth Without. The Herdsman's Cottage, a one-storey building of about 1820, is on the west side at the start of Malton Road, and the old Elmfield Villa (1832), which was a Primitive Methodist college, Elmfield College for 70 years, is about 1,000 yards (910 m) further up on the right (currently Straylands Grove).

Much of the west side of the stray is occupied by the Heworth Golf Club. On the eastern side (known as 'Heworth Stray') is an area of open parkland. Outside the old city boundary, the areas of stray on both sides of the road are less maintained, and can become boggy in wet weather, on tracks made by walkers through the longer grass. The parkland east of the Malton Road offers good views of York Minster, and occasionally is used for community events, such as the 2009 Tour of Britain festival.

== Walmgate Stray ==
Walmgate Stray (53.9467°N 1.0622°W), also known as Low Moor, is the least visible of the Strays as, unlike the others, it is not on or adjacent to a classified road. It lies to the south-east of the city, with a short boundary on Heslington Lane and direct access from Heslington Road and University Road, as well as from Fulford Road (A19), either via Kilburn Road and through the allotments, or via the cycle path which runs from the South Bank area via the Millennium Bridge and the north side of the Imphal Barracks. The entrance from Heslington Road is between the University's Fairfax House and The Retreat, and is next to No. 103, the Herdsman's Cottage of about 1840.

From the Herdsman's Cottage, the Stray first slopes upwards – this is the edge of Lamel Hill – and then gently downwards past the grounds of The Retreat on the left, and there are views over the allotments to the trees of York Cemetery on the right. At the end of The Retreat's north/south wall, the cycle path crosses the Stray from Fulford Road (on the right) to the Biology building of the University (on the left). At the east (University) end of The Retreat's southern wall is a plaque to Joseph Rowntree, who is buried in the Quaker cemetery within The Retreat's grounds. Nearby is an unusual commemorative metal seat.

Further south, towards Heslington Lane, grazing cattle may be seen. The ground is flat and can be waterlogged in wet weather.

== Bibliography ==
- York Group for the Promotion of Planning: The Strays and Ways of York (The Sessions Book Trust, 1968)
- The Strays of York and their Management through the ages. W.W.M.Nisbet 1973
