= Schön Klinik =

German healthcare company

Schön Klinik founded in 1985, is a clinic group based in Prien am Chiemsee (Bavaria) with 17 clinics in Germany and 10,000 employees. In 2016 approximately 100,000 patients were treated in the clinics. Michael Porter described the Schön Klinik as an example for a quality-oriented healthcare provider in a Harvard Business Review article published in October 2013.

It is privately run by the Schön family under the management of Dieter Schön (owner), Markus Hamm, Christopher Schön, Michael Knapp, Carla Naumann, Andreas Ludowig and Patrick Mickler. The group specializes in orthopedics, neurology, surgery, psychosomatic medicine and internal medicine.

== Clinical sites in Germany ==
=== Bavaria ===
- Bad Aibling: Schön Klinik Bad Aibling (Neurology), Schön Klinik Harthausen (orthopedics, endoprosthetics and rheumatology)
- Bad Staffelstein: Schön Klinik Bad Staffelstein (Orthopedics, Neurology and Psychosomatics)
- Berg (Starnberger See): Schön Klinik Starnberger See (internal medicine, hematology, oncology, psychosomatics and psychotherapy) – closed since 30 November 2016
- Fürth: Schön Klinik Nürnberg Fürth (surgery, orthopedics and endoprosthetics)
- Munich: Schön Klinik München Harlaching (orthopedics and sports medicine), Schön Klinik München Schwabing (Neurology), Munich – Haidhausen, day clinic Munich in Daseinstein (psychosomatics)
- Prien am Chiemsee: Schön Klinik Roseneck (Psychosomatics)
- Schönau am Königssee: Schönklinik Berchtesgadener Land (Orthopedics, Pneumology and Psychosomatics)
- Vogtareuth, Schön Klinik Vogtareuth (orthopedics, neurology and internal medicine)

=== Hamburg ===
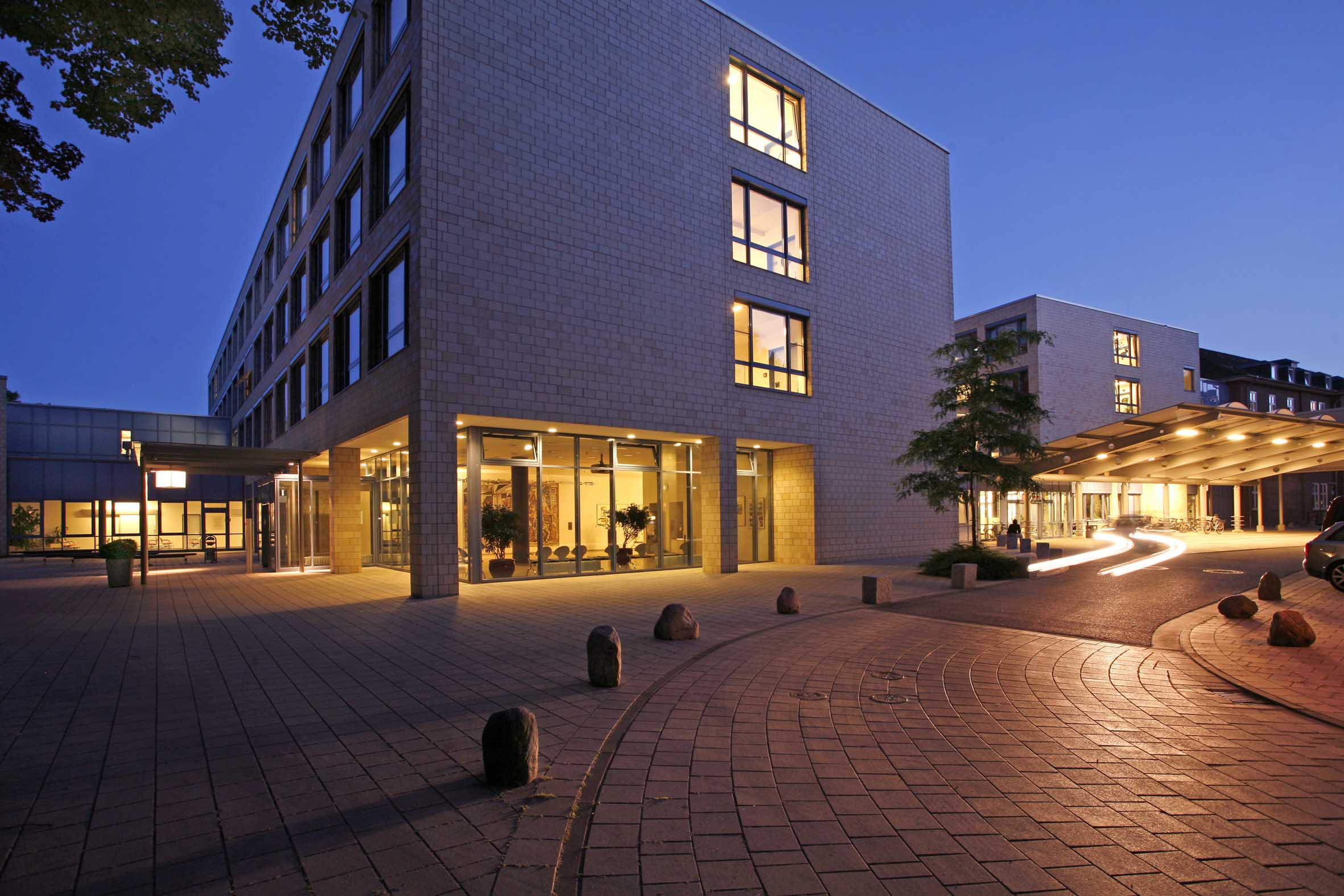
New main entrance with emergency room of the Schönklinik Hamburg-Eilbek

- Schön Klinik Hamburg Eilbek (Psychosomatics, Psychiatry, Psychotherapy, Orthopedics, Endoprosthesis and Surgery)
- day clinic Hamburg (Psychosomatics)

=== Hesse ===
- Bad Arolsen: Schön Klinik Bad Arolsen (Psychosomatics)
- Lorsch: Schön Klinik Lorsch (Orthopedics, Surgery and Endoprosthetics)

=== North Rhine-Westphalia ===
- Department of Dermatology, Duesseldorf (ENT, Cardiology, Angiology and Vascular Surgery)

=== Schleswig-Holstein ===
- Schönklinik Bad Bramstedt (Psychosomatics)
- Neustadt in Holstein, Schönklinik Neustadt (orthopedics)

=== United Kingdom ===
- Schoen Clinic London (orthopedics and scoliosis), a seven-floor facility in Wigmore Street opened in July 2018.
- The company bought Newbridge House for Eating Disorders in Sutton Coldfield which caters for people with eating disorders in May 2017.
- The company has acquired inpatient services for personality disorder and eating disorders at The Retreat in York
