= Lamel Hill =

Scheduled monument in York, England

Coordinates: 53.951014°N 1.065226°W

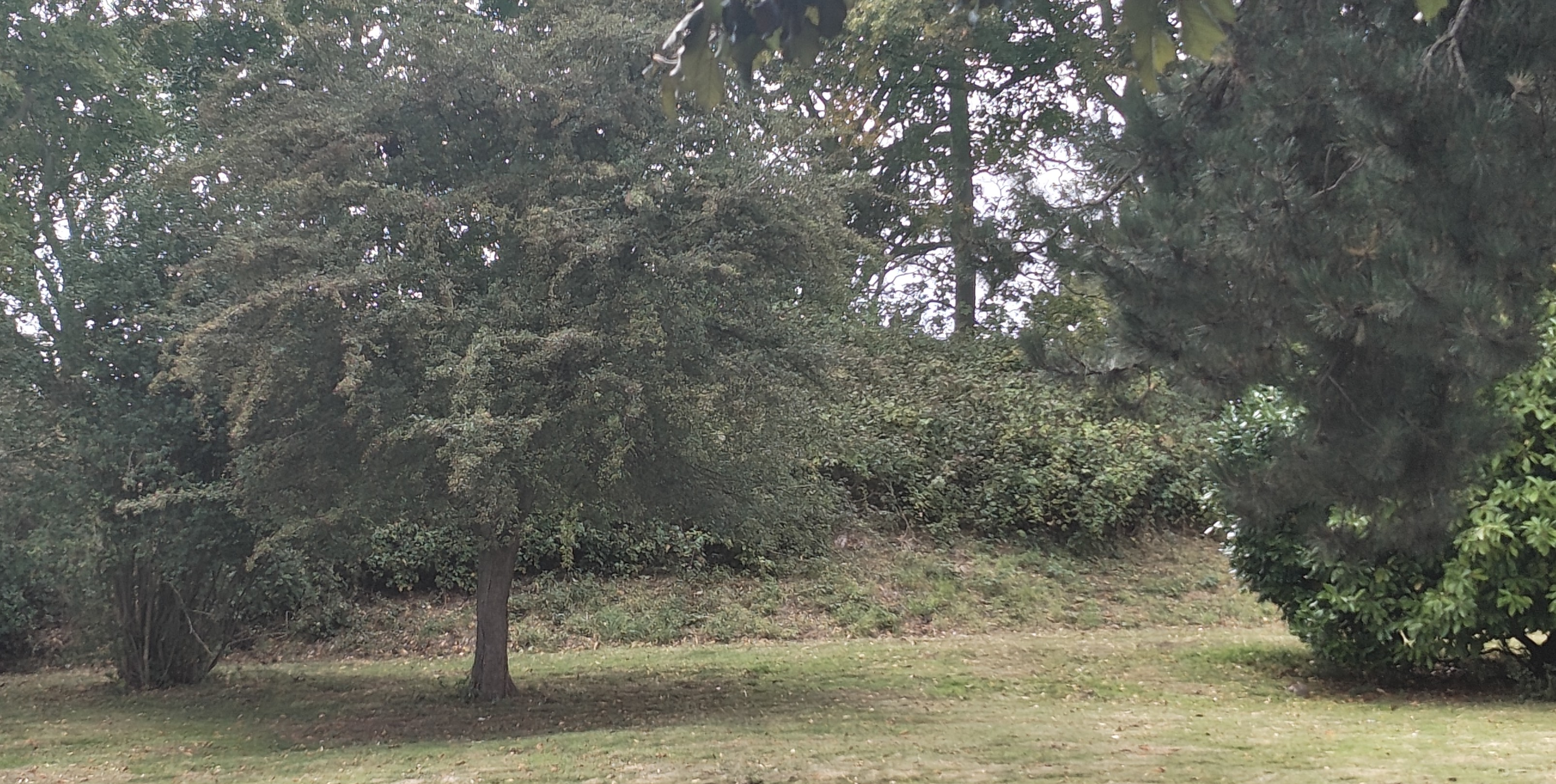
Lamel Hill

Location within York

Lamel Hill is a scheduled monument about 1 mile (1.6 km) south-east of the centre of York, England. It is on the grounds of The Retreat and the northern part of Walmgate Stray, and in some medieval documents it is referred to as Siward's Mill Hill, or Siward's How Mill, in reference to its previous use as the base of a windmill. However it should not be confused with another site known as Siward's Howe which is about 220 yards (200 m) further east.

Lamel Hill is best known for having been the location of a Parliamentary gun-emplacement aimed at Walmgate Bar in the City Walls during the Siege of York in 1644. It was the site of York's first formal archaeological excavation in 1849, when traces of an Anglo-Saxon cemetery were found. Lamel Hill is part of a conservation area which was designated in 1975.
