= Hannah Mills (Quaker) =

Hannah Mills was a Quaker from Leeds, England, whose treatment and death in 1790 while confined in the York Asylum (now Bootham Park Hospital) is recognised as having led to the development of the York Retreat, which pioneered the moral treatment of mental illness that became a model for progressive practices worldwide.

Mills was admitted as a young widow to the York Asylum on 15 March 1790, suffering from 'melancholy' (what might now be termed clinical depression). At the request of her relatives, local York Quakers tried to visit her but were refused permission on the grounds that she was in private treatment. Mills died there on 29 April 1790. These events shocked the Quakers. William Tuke was enlisted to help develop a more humane alternative and the York Retreat was opened in 1796.
