= Val-d'Aigoual =

- Commune
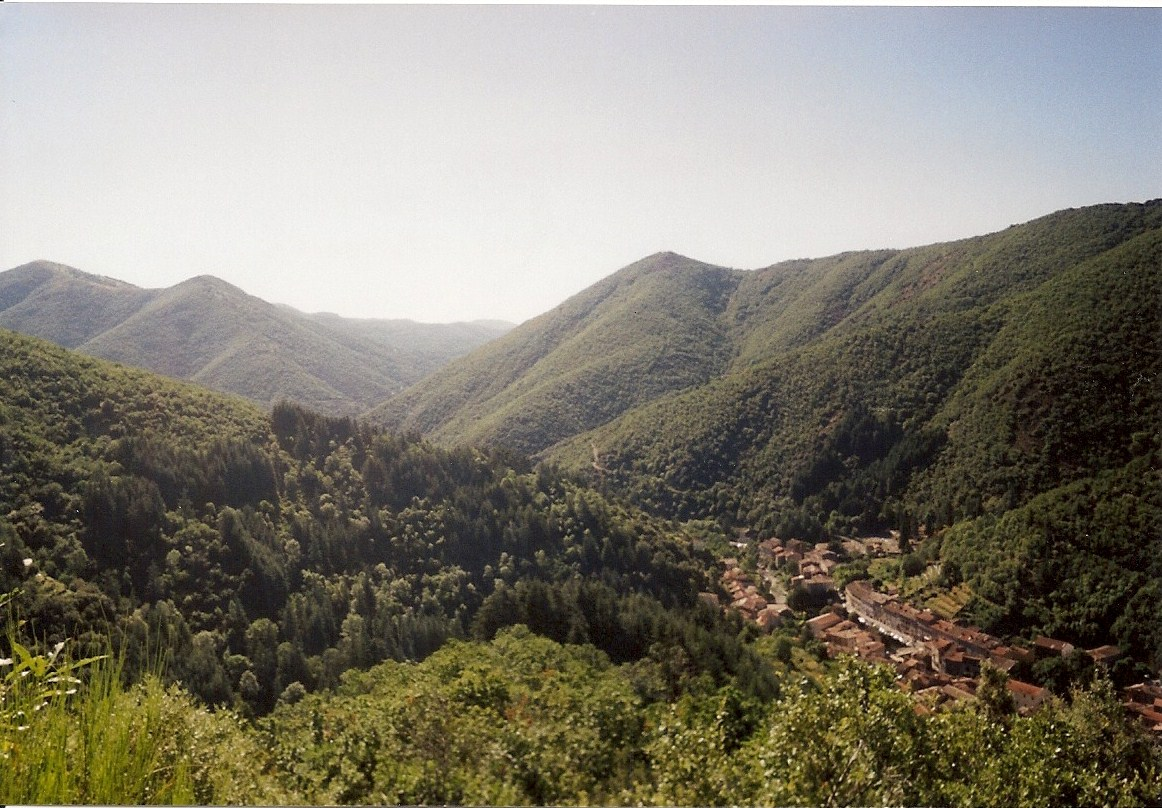
- A general view of Valleraugue
- Location of Val-d'Aigoual
- Location within France Location within Occitanie
- Coordinates: 44°04′54″N 3°38′33″E
- Country: France
- Region: Occitania
- Department: Gard
- Arrondissement: Le Vigan
- Canton: Le Vigan
- Intercommunality: Causses Aigoual Cévennes

Government
  - Mayor (2020–2026): Joël Gauthier
- Area^{1}: 78.35 km^{2} (30.25 sq mi)
- Elevation: 367 m (1,204 ft)
- Highest elevation: 1,567 m (5,141 ft)
- Lowest elevation: 294 m (965 ft)
- Population (2023): 1,412
  - Density: 18.02/km^{2} (46.68/sq mi)
- Time zone: UTC+01:00 (CET)
  - Summer (DST): UTC+02:00 (CEST)
- INSEE/Postal code: 30339 /30570
- ^{1} French Land Register data, which excludes lakes, ponds, glaciers > 1 km^{2} (0.386 sq mi or 247 acres) and river estuaries.

Val-d'Aigoual (French pronunciation: [val dɛɡwal]) is a commune in the Gard department in southern France. It was established on 1 January 2019 by merger of the former communes of Valleraugue (the seat) and Notre-Dame-de-la-Rouvière.

== Geography ==
=== Climate ===
Val-d'Aigoual has a warm-summer Mediterranean climate (Köppen climate classification Csb) closely bordering on a hot-summer Mediterranean climate (Csa). The average annual temperature in Val-d'Aigoual is 12.7 °C (54.9 °F). The average annual rainfall is 1,661.7 mm (65.42 in) with October as the wettest month. The temperatures are highest on average in July, at around 21.8 °C (71.2 °F), and lowest in January, at around 4.8 °C (40.6 °F). The highest temperature ever recorded in Val-d'Aigoual was 41.1 °C (106.0 °F) on 12 August 2003; the coldest temperature ever recorded was −12.0 °C (10.4 °F) on 14 February 1999.

Climate data for Val-d'Aigoual (Valleraugue, altitude 360m, 1981–2010 normals, extremes 1993–2010)
Month	Jan	Feb	Mar	Apr	May	Jun	Jul	Aug	Sep	Oct	Nov	Dec	Year
Record high °C (°F)	19.9 (67.8)	21.3 (70.3)	27.5 (81.5)	31.1 (88.0)	33.1 (91.6)	39.5 (103.1)	37.8 (100.0)	41.1 (106.0)	36.5 (97.7)	28.6 (83.5)	23.5 (74.3)	20.3 (68.5)	41.1 (106.0)
Mean daily maximum °C (°F)	9.0 (48.2)	10.8 (51.4)	15.2 (59.4)	17.6 (63.7)	21.8 (71.2)	27.1 (80.8)	29.8 (85.6)	29.1 (84.4)	23.7 (74.7)	18.2 (64.8)	12.7 (54.9)	9.0 (48.2)	18.7 (65.7)
Daily mean °C (°F)	4.8 (40.6)	5.7 (42.3)	9.1 (48.4)	11.6 (52.9)	15.2 (59.4)	19.4 (66.9)	21.8 (71.2)	21.4 (70.5)	17.0 (62.6)	13.2 (55.8)	8.3 (46.9)	5.0 (41.0)	12.7 (54.9)
Mean daily minimum °C (°F)	0.7 (33.3)	0.6 (33.1)	3.0 (37.4)	5.6 (42.1)	8.6 (47.5)	11.7 (53.1)	13.9 (57.0)	13.8 (56.8)	10.2 (50.4)	8.2 (46.8)	3.9 (39.0)	1.0 (33.8)	6.8 (44.2)
Record low °C (°F)	−10.1 (13.8)	−12.0 (10.4)	−11.6 (11.1)	−2.5 (27.5)	−0.7 (30.7)	3.4 (38.1)	5.2 (41.4)	5.1 (41.2)	1.7 (35.1)	−4.6 (23.7)	−7.9 (17.8)	−10.6 (12.9)	−12.0 (10.4)
Average precipitation mm (inches)	170.3 (6.70)	113.7 (4.48)	77.7 (3.06)	136.9 (5.39)	115.5 (4.55)	56.7 (2.23)	39.2 (1.54)	55.8 (2.20)	166.6 (6.56)	267.2 (10.52)	252.0 (9.92)	210.1 (8.27)	1,661.7 (65.42)
Average precipitation days (≥ 1.0 mm)	10.9	8.7	6.7	8.8	8.4	5.1	4.6	5.9	6.3	10.7	10.5	10.1	96.6
Source: Météo-France

== See also ==
- Communes of the Gard department
