= Joseph Barnard Davis =

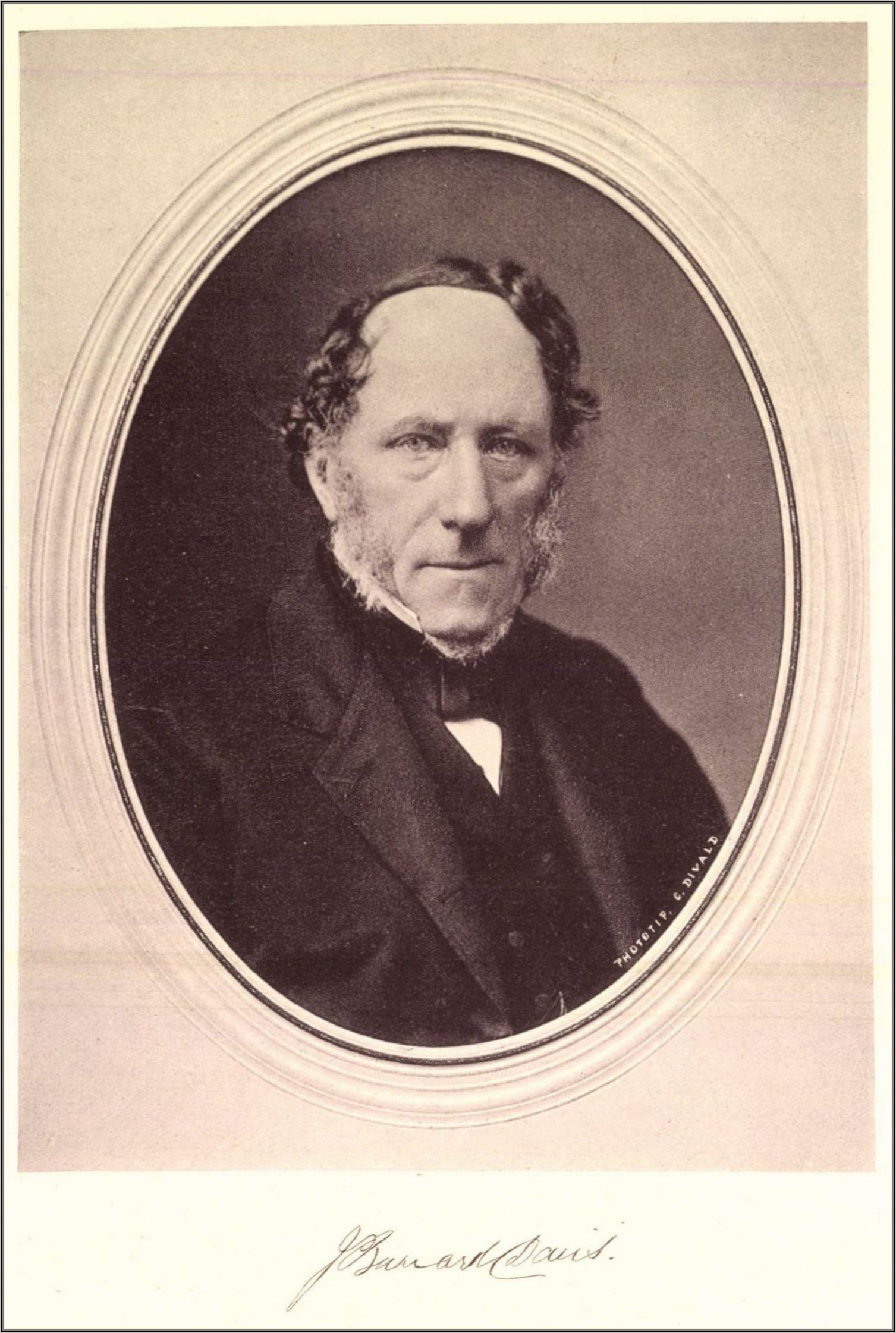
- Born: 13 June 1801
- Died: 19 May 1881 (aged 79)
- Citizenship: British
- Education: University of St. Andrews
- Known for: Thesaurus Craniorum

Joseph Barnard Davis (13 June 1801 – 19 May 1881) was an English medical doctor now remembered as a collector and craniologist.

== Early life ==
Joseph was born on 13 June 1801 in York, England. He was educated at a private school in the town before being contracted to John Wilson of York as an apprentice for five years on 17 July 1816. The apprentice, which was later reduced to three years, intended to teach Joseph the occupation of surgery and apothecary.

In the summer of 1820, while still a student, Davis went as a surgeon in a whaling ship to the Arctic seas. He obtained the Apothecaries' Hall qualification in 1823, became a member of the Society of Apothecaries, and then, a fellow of the Society of Apothecaries in 1854. Davis was appointed the medical officer for Stoke-on-Trent district in 1823. Joshua Brookes was his anatomy teacher who was known to acquire corpses from body snatchers. During Joseph's study later, he purchased some of the human remains from Brooke's collection after it was sold to phrenologist James De Ville. In 1843 Davis qualified as a member of the Royal College of Surgeons of England. On 10 May 1862, Davis received his medical doctorate by examination from the University of St Andrews, Scotland.

Joseph early settled at Albion Street Shelton, Staffordshire (now Hanley), and was a medical practitioner till his death on 19 May 1881. He was elected a Fellow of the Royal Society in 1868.

He was active in local life and was an important member of the Athenaeum, Stoke-on-Trent. As such he played a part in establishing the first Museum of the Natural History, Pottery and Antiquities.

== Collection and works ==
In 1836 he published a Popular Manual of the Art of Preserving Health.

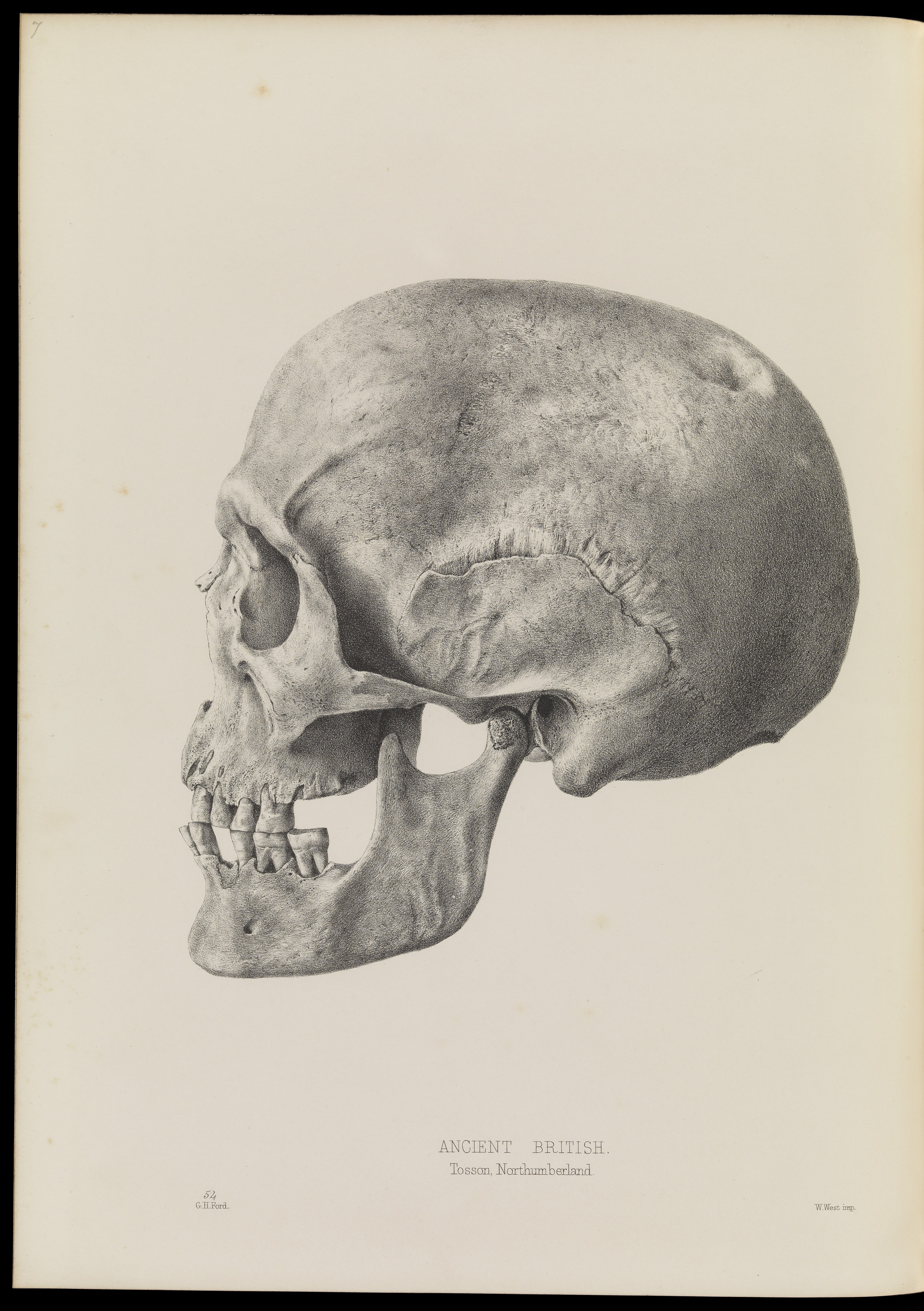
"Crania Britannica: delineations and descriptions of the skulls of the aboriginal and early inhabitants of the British Islands with notices of their other remains", by Joseph Barnard Davis and John Thurnam.

Davis collected a museum of skulls and skeletons of various races, nearly all with histories; it was larger than all the collections in British public museums put together, numbering 1474 in 1867. His personal collection began with two skulls bought from Matthew Moorhouse in 1848. He purchased in 1861 from the collection of James De Ville, a phrenologist, including crania from the Museum of Joshua Brookes. He corresponded with travellers, collectors, and residents in foreign countries. In 1856 he began with John Thurnam, the publication of Crania Britannica: delineations and descriptions of the skulls of the aboriginal and early inhabitants of the British islands, with text, plates and an accompanying atlas. The work was completed in 1865.

In 1867 he published a catalogue of the collection called Thesaurus Craniorum, describing and figuring many specimens, and giving 25,000 measurements. In 1875 a supplement to the Thesaurus was published. In 1879 or 1880 the Royal College of Surgeons purchased the collection, then numbering 1800 crania and some skeletons.

As well as his collection of human remains, Davis was an avid collector of books, photographs, prints, drawings and artefacts relating to many cultural groups. Amongst his collection were works of art and artefacts collected originally by George Augustus Robinson from Tasmania and from the state of Victoria, Australia. The Australian works were mainly purchased by Davis after Robinson’s death from Robinson’s widow. Davis also bought art works relating to Tasmanian Aborigines directly from the artist John Skinner Prout.

He was also interested in the most ancient history of his local north Staffordshire, having a collection of the rare carved runic calendar sticks from the north part of the county. He published a detailed article on these, "Some Account of Runic Calendars and Staffordshire Clogg Almanacs", Archaologia, Vol. XLI, Part II, 1867, pages 453-478.

For some years from 1870 he was one of the editors of the Journal of Anthropology, and of Anthropologia.

Davis’s collection was dispersed after his death through a series of auctions in London at Sotheby’s in 1883. Many works relating to Oceania, Asia, the Americas and Africa were purchased by A W Franks and given to the British Museum in the late 1880s and 1890s.

== Findings ==
Davis was a critic of the idea of human speciation. He believed that comparative anatomy would demonstrate that racial differences were immutable. He supported anti-evolutionary views, and presented a paper to the British Association for the Advancement of Science in 1868, on brain weight, publishing Contributions towards Determining the Weight of the Brain in Different Races of Man (Philosophical Transactions, 1868, clviii. 505–28). In an 1869 paper On the Weight of the Brain in the Negro he argued that brain weight was a racial characteristic.

A polygenist, he drew conclusions on the intellectual capacities of the Australian Aborigines, in particular, from his collection. A motivation for his collecting was his belief that the morphology of the Australian remains provided indications of a separate origin.
