= Notre-Dame-de-la-Rouvière =

- Part of Val-d'Aigoual
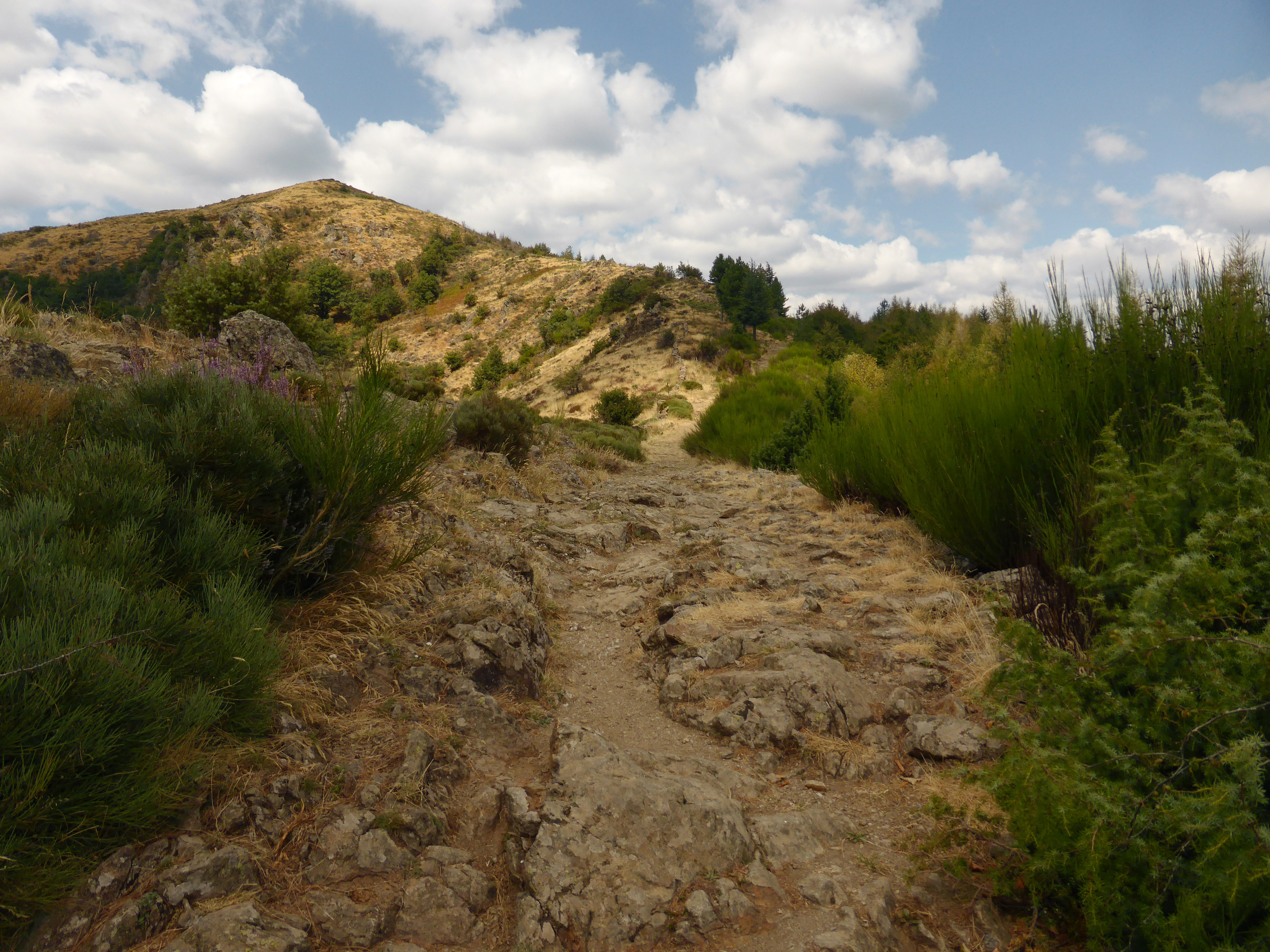
- A view near the summit of the Serre de Borgne

- Coat of arms
- Location of Notre-Dame-de-la-Rouvière
- Location within France Location within Occitanie
- Coordinates: 44°02′57″N 3°42′06″E
- Country: France
- Region: Occitania
- Department: Gard
- Arrondissement: Le Vigan
- Canton: Le Vigan
- Commune: Val-d'Aigoual
- Area^{1}: 16.49 km^{2} (6.37 sq mi)
- Elevation: 380 m (1,250 ft)
- Highest elevation: 1,165 m (3,822 ft)
- Lowest elevation: 273 m (896 ft)
- Population (2016): 408
  - Density: 24.7/km^{2} (64.1/sq mi)
- Time zone: UTC+01:00 (CET)
  - Summer (DST): UTC+02:00 (CEST)
- Postal code: 30570
- ^{1} French Land Register data, which excludes lakes, ponds, glaciers > 1 km^{2} (0.386 sq mi or 247 acres) and river estuaries.

Notre-Dame-de-la-Rouvière (French pronunciation: [nɔtʁ dam də la ʁuvjɛʁ]; Occitan: Nòstra Dama de la Rovièira) is a former commune in the Gard department in southern France. On 1 January 2019, it was merged into the new commune Val-d'Aigoual.

== See also ==
- Communes of the Gard department
