= John Candler (abolitionist) =

John Candler (10 April 1787 in Great Bardfield – 4 July 1869) was an English abolitionist active in Chelmsford, Essex.

== Early life ==
He was the son of Elizabeth and William Candler, a schoolmaster, born into a religious family. Around 1799 William Candler gave up his school and moved to Ipswich. There John was apprenticed to a Quaker draper. He studied Hebrew and Greek to read the Bible scriptures.

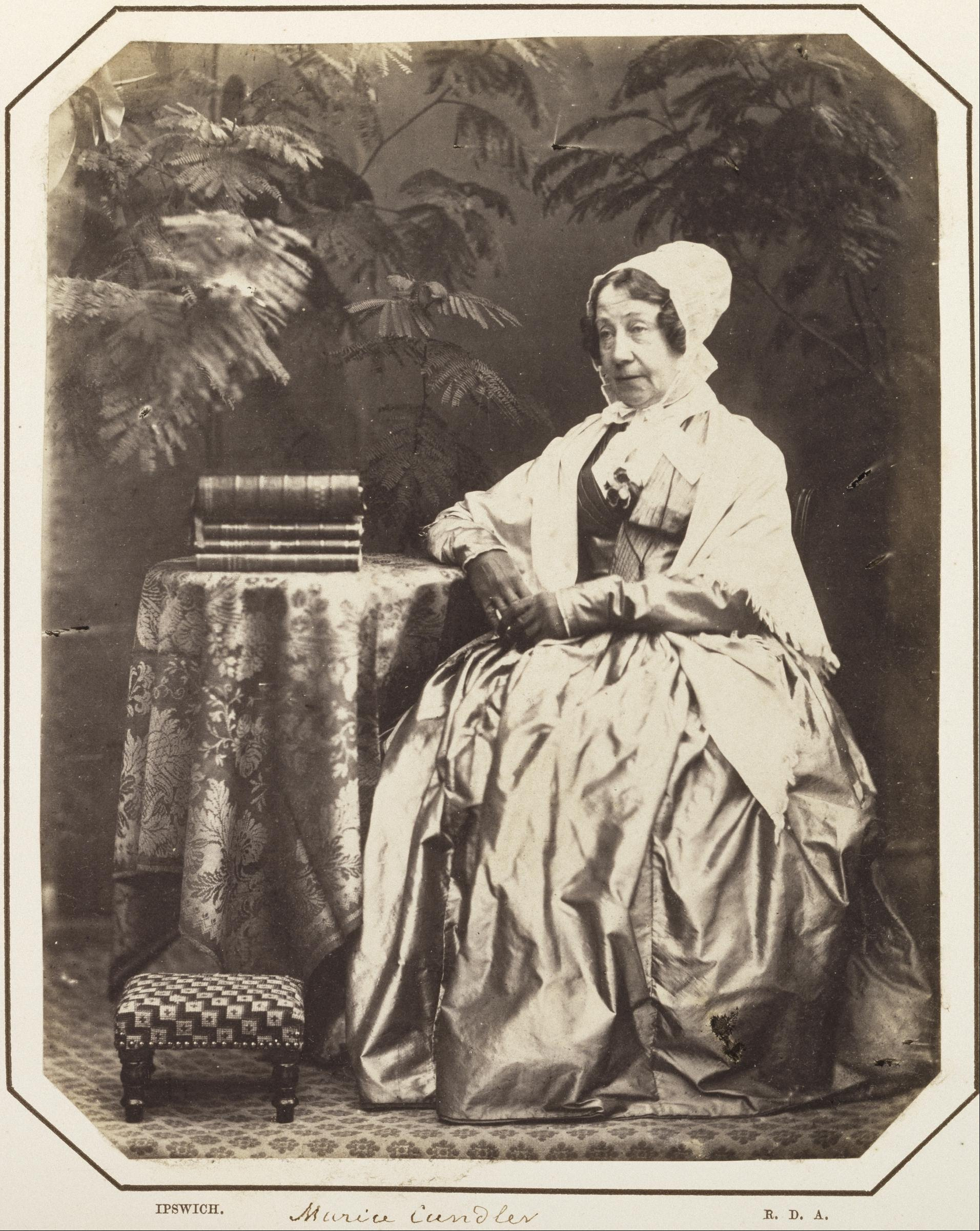
Maria Candler

John Candler moved to Chelmsford, where he set up in business as a draper with a partner from that town. The business was successful, and he married in 1814 Maria Knight (1791–1870) of Chelmsford, sister of Anne Knight, When their finances permitted, the couple worked for reform movements such as temperance and the abolition of slavery.

== In the Caribbean and North America ==
In 1839 John and Maria Candler set out on a tour of the Caribbean. John visited more than a dozen islands, including Jamaica, Barbados, Martinique, Tortola, Saint Thomas and Puerto Rico. He sent optimistic reports to his friend Thomas Clarkson regarding the prospects of the recently liberated former slaves. They then started a three-month stay in Haiti on 1 January 1841. He met with President Jean-Pierre Boyer, who enquired after Clarkson. In April John went on to the United States of America and Canada, returning to England in September of that year. He was then successfully proposed by Joseph Cooper as a corresponding member of the British Anti-Slavery Society.

== Later life ==
Candler was in 1842 appointed Superintendent to The Retreat, a Quaker asylum, a role he shared with Maria. He remained there until 1846, when, following the passing of the Lunacy Act 1845, he was replaced with a medically qualified doctor, John Thurnam.

Candler with Wilson Burgess went to the Empire of Brazil in 1852. In 1853 Candler went on an abolitionist visit to the United States, in a group with William Forster and his brother Josiah, and William Holmes (1805–1867). After meeting President Franklin Pierce, they then travelled through many states, William Forster dying in January 1854 in Tennessee.

== Works ==
- West Indies. Extracts from the journal of John Candler, whilst travelling in Jamaica. London: Harvey and Darton, 1841
