= Valleraugue =

- Part of Val-d'Aigoual
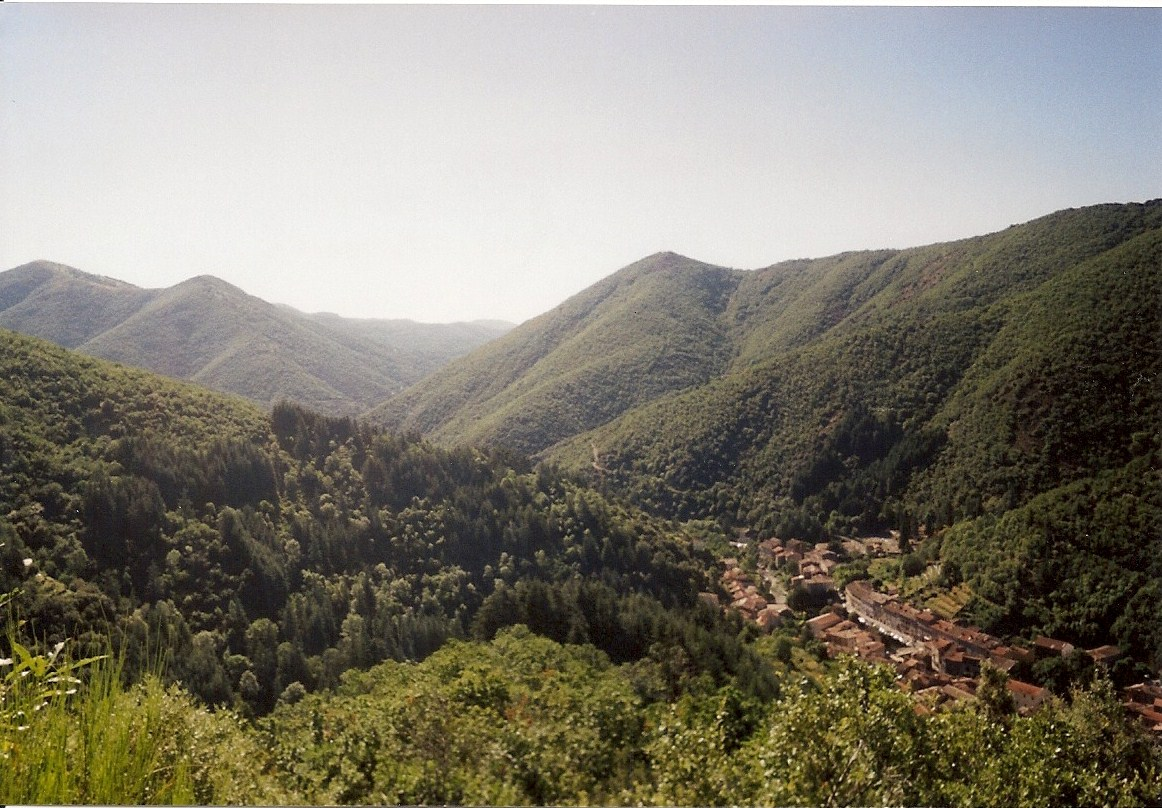
- A general view of Valleraugue

- Coat of arms
- Location of Valleraugue
- Location within France Location within Occitanie
- Coordinates: 44°04′54″N 3°38′33″E
- Country: France
- Region: Occitania
- Department: Gard
- Arrondissement: Le Vigan
- Canton: Le Vigan
- Commune: Val-d'Aigoual
- Area^{1}: 78.35 km^{2} (30.25 sq mi)
- Elevation: 367 m (1,204 ft)
- Highest elevation: 1,567 m (5,141 ft)
- Lowest elevation: 294 m (965 ft)
- Population (2016): 1,061
  - Density: 13.54/km^{2} (35.07/sq mi)
- Time zone: UTC+01:00 (CET)
  - Summer (DST): UTC+02:00 (CEST)
- Postal code: 30570
- ^{1} French Land Register data, which excludes lakes, ponds, glaciers > 1 km^{2} (0.386 sq mi or 247 acres) and river estuaries.

Valleraugue (French pronunciation: [valʁoɡ]; Occitan: Valarauga) is a former commune in the Gard department in southern France. On 1 January 2019, it was merged into the new commune Val-d'Aigoual.

== Geography ==
Valleraugue is located in a deep valley of the Cévennes mountains, on the river Hérault. The Mont Aigoual weather station is located on the territory of the commune.

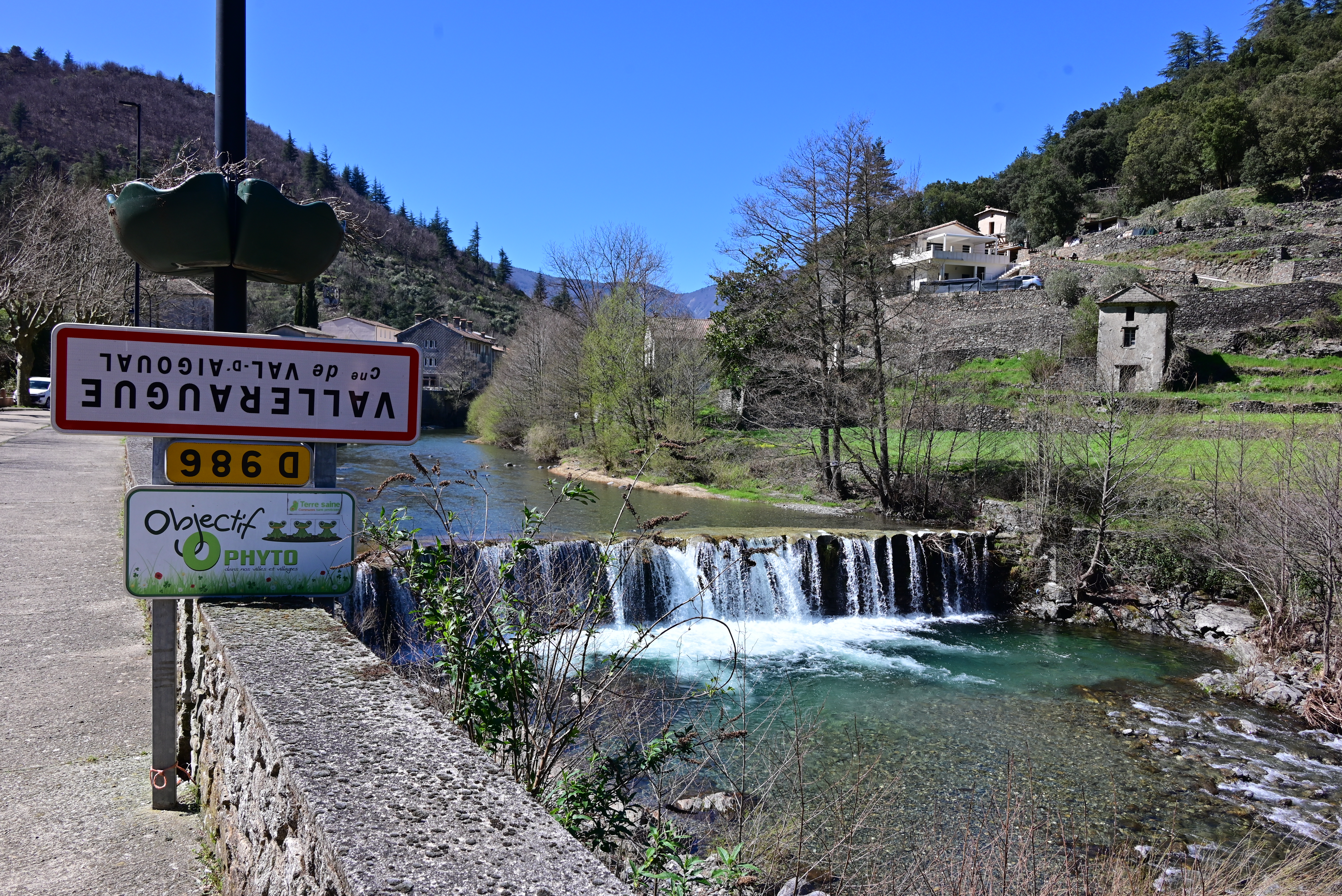
Entrance of Valleraugue.

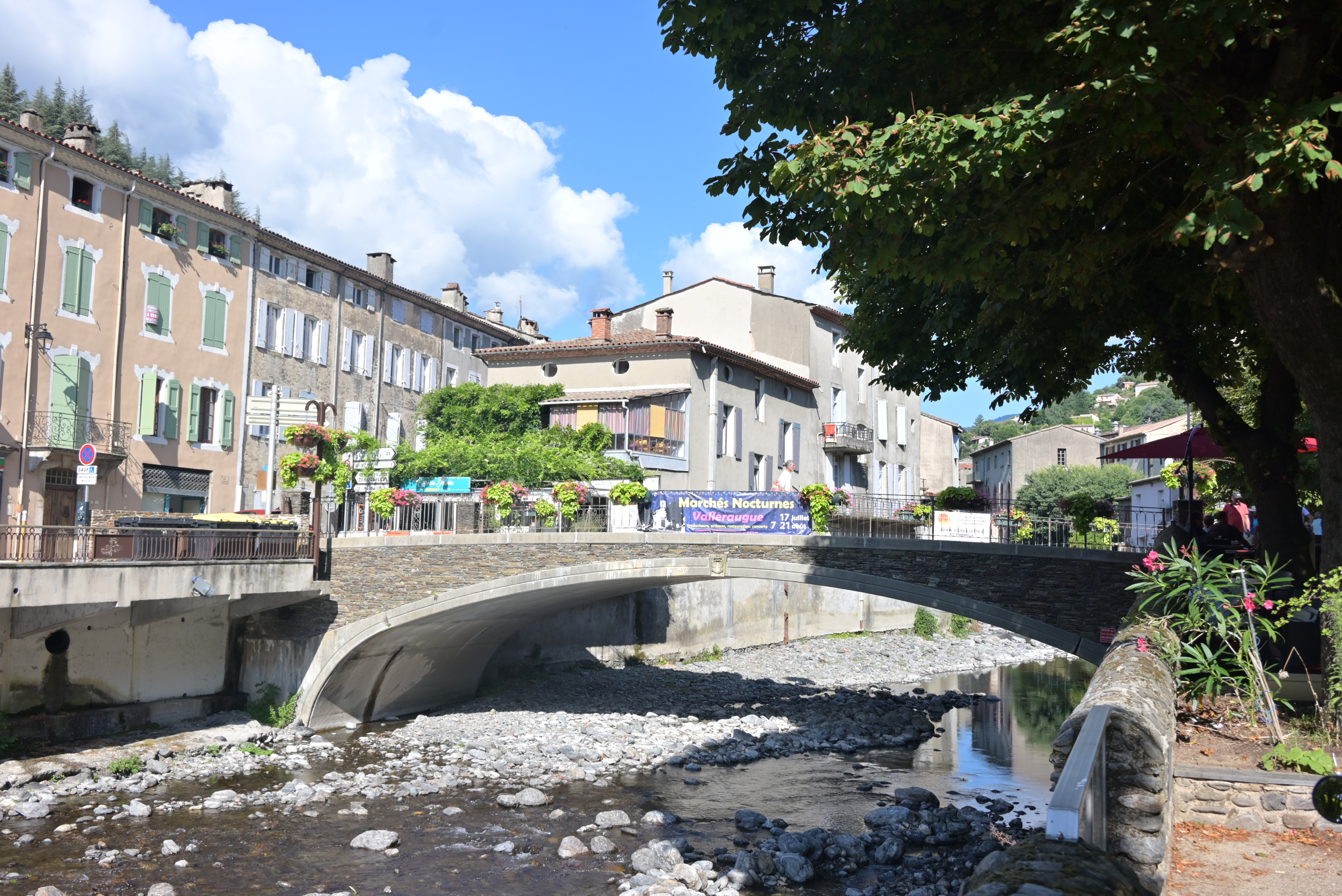
Bridge on the Hérault river in Valleraugue.

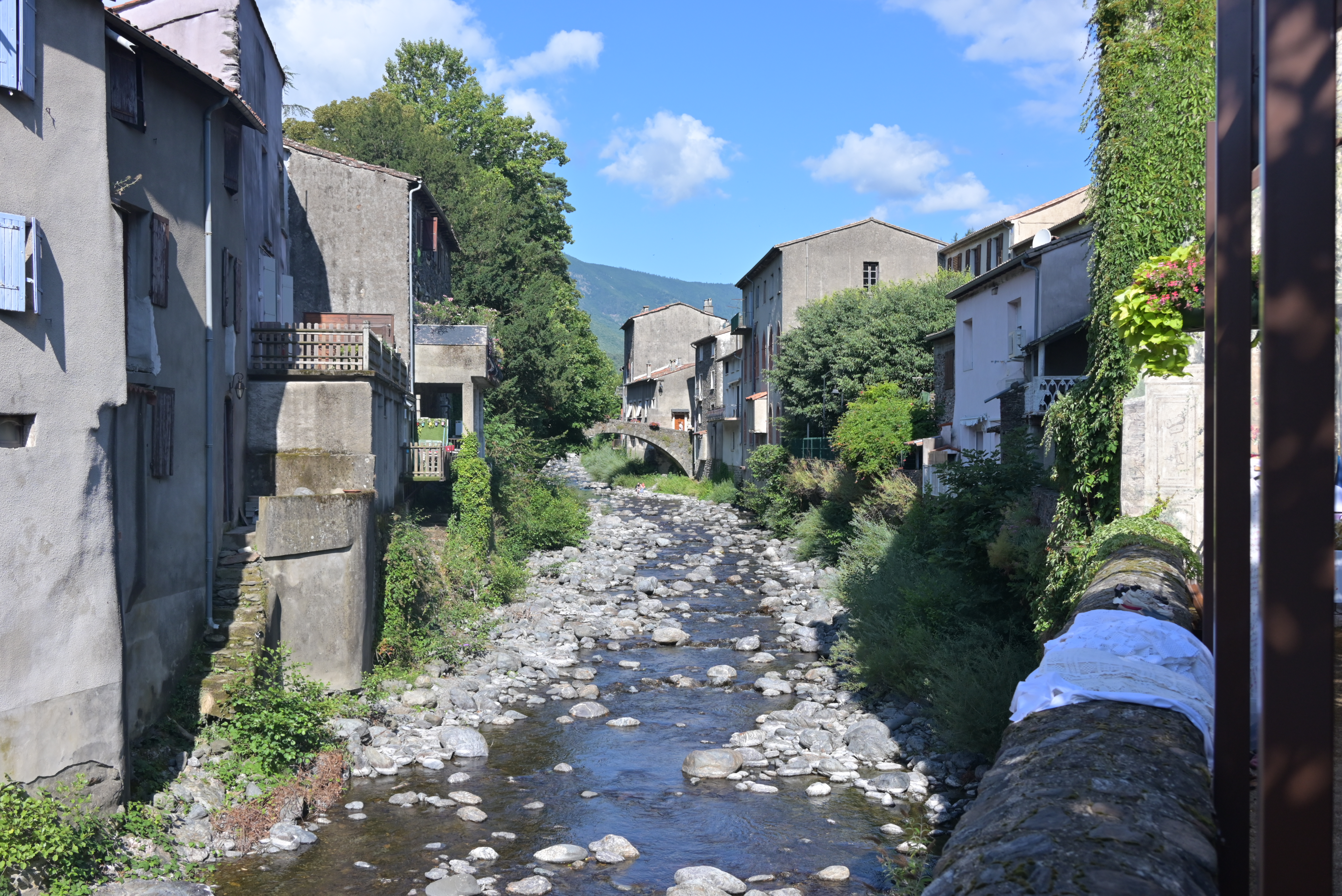
The Hérault river in Valleraugue.

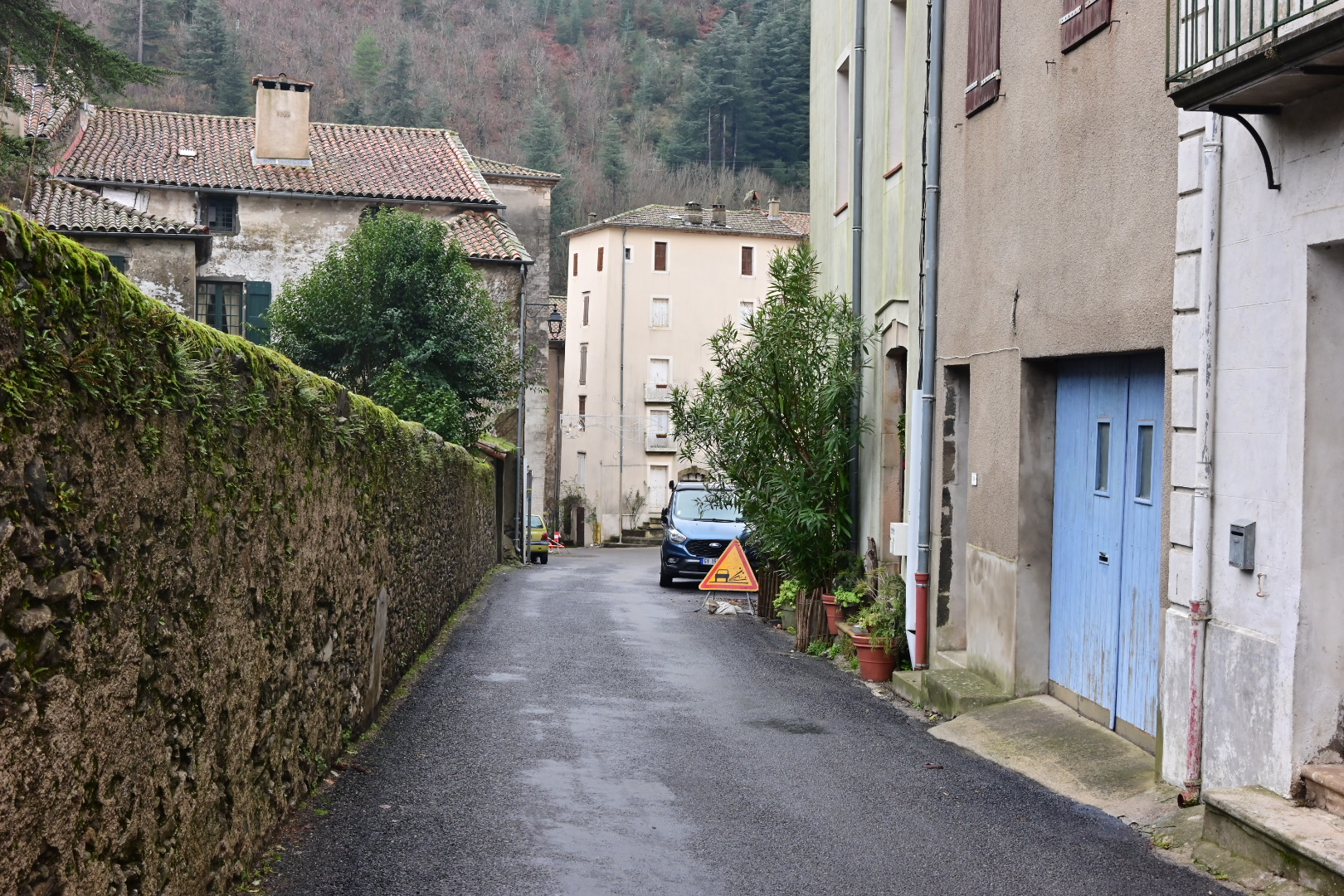
Street of Valleraugue

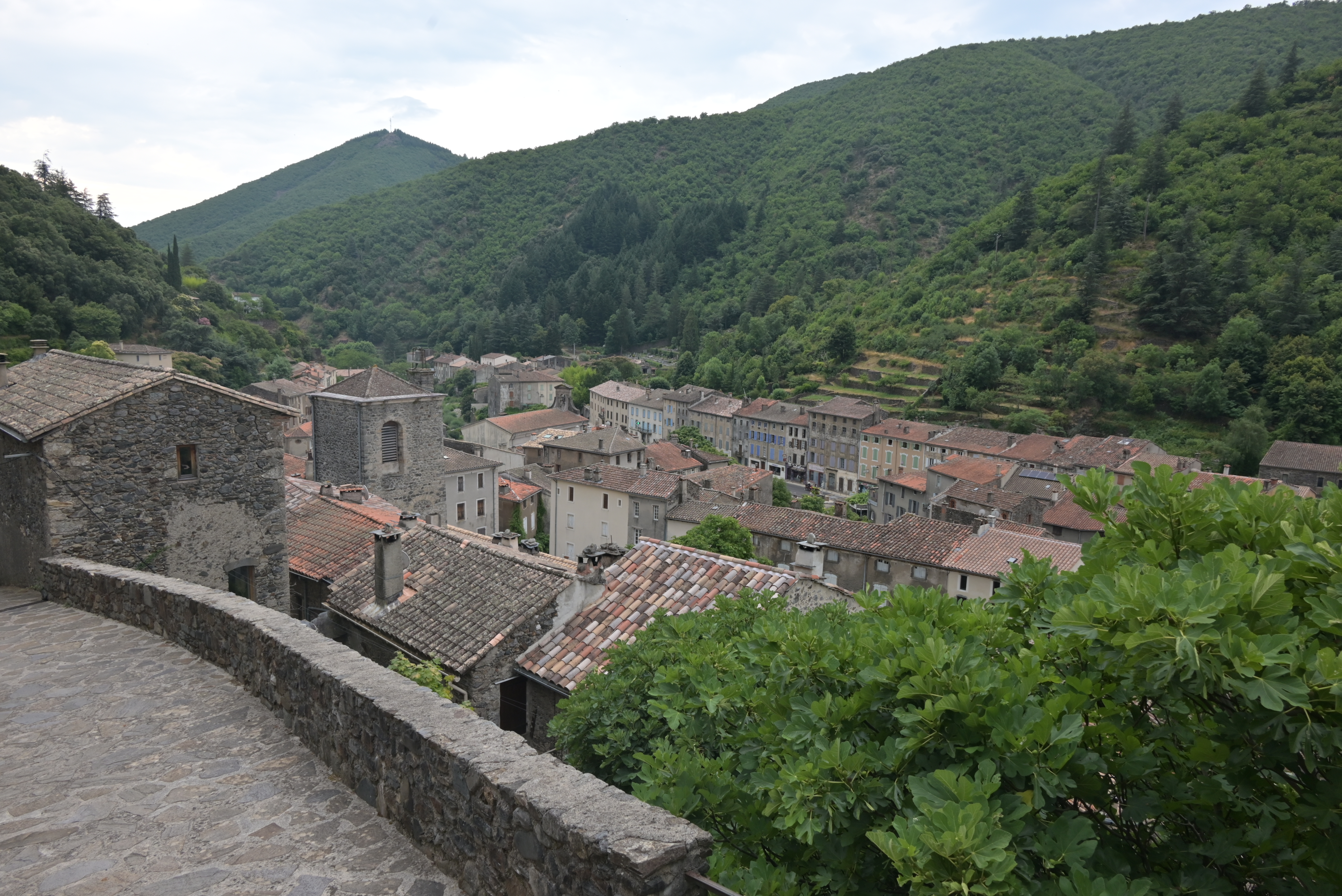
Valleraugue as seen from the Belvedere place.

== Population ==
Historical population

Year	Pop.	±% p.a.
1793	3,264	—
1821	3,614	+0.36%
1846	3,890	+0.29%
1872	3,443	−0.47%
1901	2,443	−1.18%
1926	1,808	−1.20%
1946	1,401	−1.27%

Year	Pop.	±% p.a.
1962	1,047	−1.80%
1968	1,017	−0.48%
1975	1,028	+0.15%
1982	1,041	+0.18%
1990	1,091	+0.59%
1999	1,009	−0.86%
2016	1,061	+0.30%

Source: EHESS and INSEE

== Sights ==
Medieval town with 26 bridges, most of them several centuries old.

== Personalities ==
Valleraugue was the birthplace of:

- Jean Louis Armand de Quatrefages de Bréau (1810–1892), naturalist was born at Berthézène, which is part of Valleraugue
- Francois Perrier (1835–1888), Brigadier-general and commander of the Légion d'honneur

== See also ==
- Communes of the Gard department
