= Bootham Park Hospital =

Grade I listed building in York, England

Coordinates: 53.967°N 1.087°W

- Tees, Esk and Wear Valleys NHS Foundation Trust
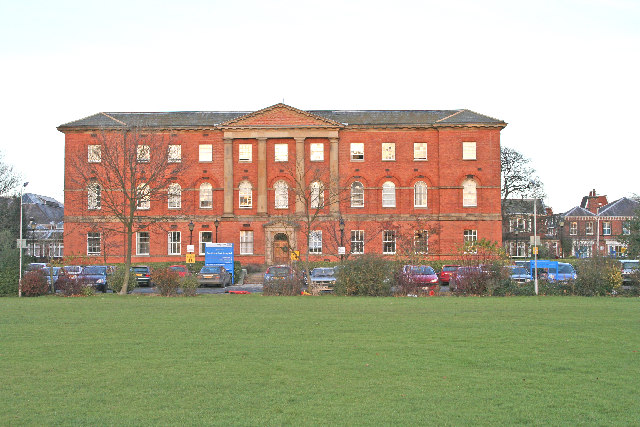
- Frontage of Bootham Park Hospital as seen from Bootham

- Shown in North Yorkshire

Geography
- Location: York, North Yorkshire, England

Organisation
- Care system: NHS
- Type: Specialist

Services
- Emergency department: No
- Speciality: Mental health

History
- Founded: 1777
- Closed: 2015

Links
- Lists: Hospitals in England

Designations

Listed Building – Grade I
- Official name: Bootham Park Hospital: front range, 1886 link block, late-C18 building, 1817 range and 1908 extension
- Designated: 24 June 1983
- Reference no.: 1259396

Bootham Park Hospital was a psychiatric hospital, located in the Bootham district of York, England. The hospital was founded by Robert Hay Drummond, the Archbishop of York, in 1772, and led to the founding of a new asylum known as The Retreat in 1790. The hospital building became severely dilapidated and was declared unfit by the Care Quality Commission in late September 2015 and closed on 1 October 2015. It was replaced by the new 72-bed Foss Park Hospital. It was managed by the Tees, Esk and Wear Valleys NHS Foundation Trust. The main building is Grade I listed.

== History ==
=== Construction and operation ===
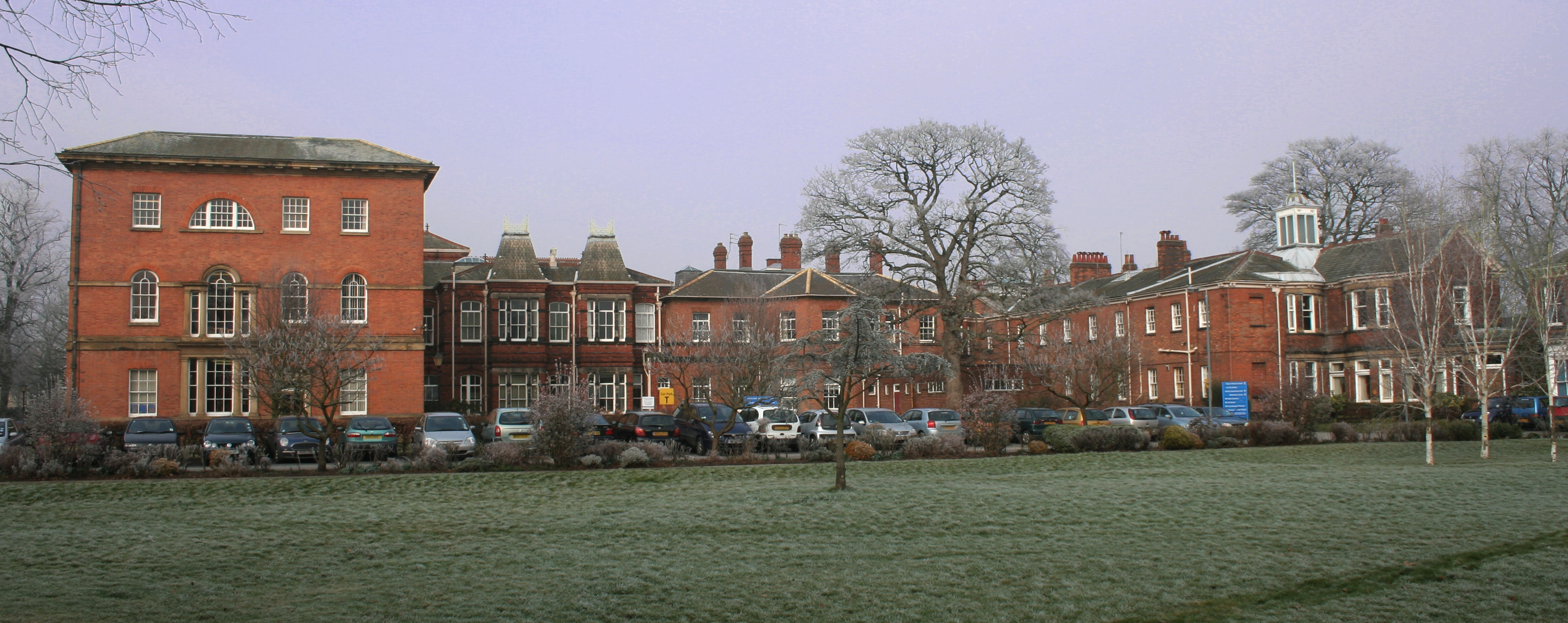
Side view of Bootham Park Hospital from Union Terrace. The pavilion on the left is an end-on view of Carr's original building.

In 1772, Robert Hay Drummond, the Archbishop of York, decided along with "twenty-four Yorkshire gentlemen" to establish an asylum, to be known as the "County Lunatic Asylum, York". A committee was established, and the architect John Carr was co-opted with a pledge of 25 guineas. Carr's patron, the Marquis of Rockingham, pledged 100 guineas, and a total of £2,500 was subscribed. By July 1773, £5,000 had been promised, and Carr's scheme to accommodate 54 patients was approved on 25 August. The building was completed in 1777.

Following criticism about the handling of inmates at the asylum and the death of Hannah Mills, who was a Quaker, the local Quaker community founded a new asylum known as The Retreat in 1790. The asylum became Bootham Park Hospital in 1904 and it joined the National Health Service in 1948.

=== Closure ===
In late September 2015 the hospital building was declared unfit by the Care Quality Commission, and ordered to close by the end of the month. Staff were given 5 days' notice to close the building. The hospital was closed on 1 October 2015, having been declared unfit for purpose. On the same day Tees, Esk and Wear Valleys NHS Foundation Trust replaced Leeds and York Partnership NHS Foundation Trust as the provider of most mental health services in York. Patients were transferred suddenly to other premises, some quite distant.

An independent report commissioned by City of York Council from John Ransford concluded:

- The Vale of York Clinical Commissioning Group failed to ensure that the transfer was properly managed;
- Leeds & York Partnership NHS Foundation Trust had not properly taken responsibility for the building, although they spent £2.7 million on refurbishing the old building;
- If Tees, Esk and Wear Valleys NHS Foundation Trust failed to investigate the problems they would be sanctioned;
- NHS Property Services significantly underestimated the logistic and practical challenges of upgrading a Grade I listed building where shortcomings had been identified over many years;
- The Care Quality Commission gave insufficient attention to the particular issues raised by formal de-registration and registration of facilities, triggered by the transfer of services between agencies.

A smaller 24-bedded unit opened in 2016 replacing the 36 beds from Bootham Park Hospital. Outpatient clinics also reopened in February 2016. In April 2020 the hospital was being considered as a location where additional beds could be provided during the COVID-19 pandemic. Later the same month, the new 72-bed Foss Park Hospital opened in a different part of the city as a permanent replacement to Bootham Park Hospital.

== See also ==
- Grade I listed buildings in the City of York
- Listed buildings in York (outside the city walls, northern part)
