= James De Ville =

British phrenologist

James De Ville (12 March 1777 – 6 May 1846) was a British lamp maker, sculptor and plaster-caster, known also as a phrenologist. He acquired moulds and busts for business purposes, manufacturing reproductions, and also built up a renowned phrenological collection.

== Early life ==
From a Swiss Protestant background on his father's side, he was born in Hammersmith, the son of James Louis De Ville and his wife Mary Bryant. His family fell on hard times, and as a boy De Ville was fostered by an uncle who had a brickmaking business there.

De Ville learned plaster casting from Charles Harris (died 1796), to whom he was apprenticed at age 12.

== Businessman ==
De Ville set up a plaster works in Soho in 1803, moving on after two years to Great Newport Street in the Covent Garden–Leicester Square area. In the 1810s he was in business as a lampmaker and plaster caster, dealing also in lighthouse fittings. From 1814, he had business premises at 367 Strand, London, opposite Fountain Court.

In other lines of business, De Ville dealt in architectural metal wares, and supplied lights for the Menai Bridge. He joined the Institute of Civil Engineers in 1823. From the late 1820s he provided gas fittings to Hanwell Asylum. He also engaged in radical politics.

== Caster, moulder, sculptor ==
While still young, De Ville worked for the sculptor Joseph Nollekens on casting. He later bought the moulds for busts made by Nollekens. In 1817 Bryan Donkin, representing an early British phrenological group, commissioned him to do some reproductive moulding work.

De Ville's first life-mask was that of William Blake, taken 1 August 1823. He travelled to Devon to take another, of the teenage William Makepeace Thackeray, in 1824–5; it was much later used by Joseph Boehm and Onslow Ford.

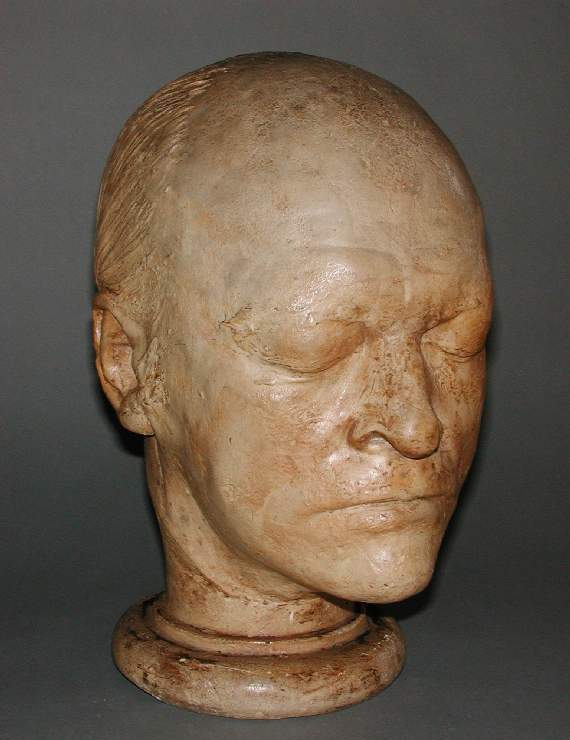
Life-mask of William Blake, plaster cast by James De Ville 1823 (Fitzwilliam Museum, Cambridge)

In the period 1823 to 1826, De Ville showed busts at the Royal Academy. His sitters included Harford Jones-Brydges.

== Phrenologist ==
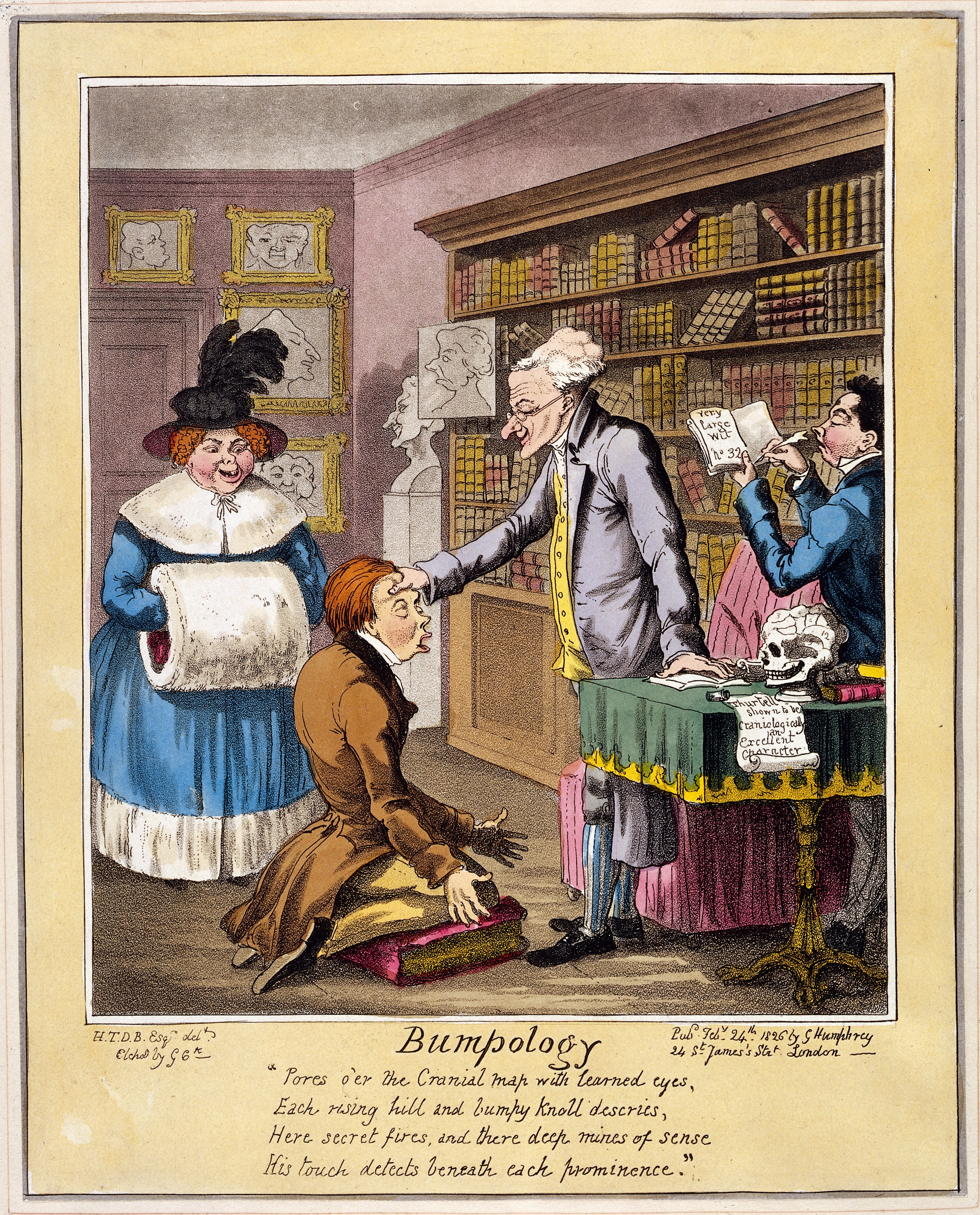
Satirical print of 1826, Bumpology, showing a caricature phrenologist, intended for James De Ville, conducting an examination of a youth

De Ville started to collect phrenological specimens in 1817, and in 1821 began to cast heads from life. In 1829 Johann Spurzheim referred to his collection as data supporting phrenology. Franz Joseph Gall sent a wax mould of a dissected brain. There were casts taken from the collection of Joshua Brookes, and skulls from Australia including some supplied by Robert Espie.

George Murray Paterson, who began to teach phrenology in the Bengal Presidency in 1825, ordered 90 phrenological busts from De Ville to show in his lectures. In a room adjacent to his shop, De Ville gave public shows of part of his collection of casts and skulls. Jonathan Mason Warren saw the collection in 1832 and found it impressive; on the same occasion De Ville did a phrenological reading of James Jackson Jr., which Warren did not find convincing.

De Ville campaigned against penal transportation, at the same time involving himself with phrenological examination of convicts. In 1826 James Wardrop hired him to examine convicts about to be transported in the England to Australia. Of 148 convicts, De Ville provided notes on around one-third, to the ship's surgeon George Thomson. Wardrop's intention was to discredit De Ville's evaluations: in the event, there was a plot among the convicts to take over the ship, and the effect, according to Thomson's notes, was to validate De Ville's prediction of troublemakers.

Joseph d'Ortigue and Ludwig Rellstab, early biographers of Franz Liszt, recount how Liszt at age 15 was examined in 1825 by De Ville. As a phrenological practitioner, he examined a large number of heads including those of John Elliotson, Hermann Prince of Pückler-Muskau, Charles Bray, George Eliot, William Blake, Richard Dale Owen, Richard Carlile, the Duke of Wellington and Prince Albert. Harriet Martineau, a believer in phrenology but mocker of incompetent phrenologists, found it amusing that De Ville's examination of her head led to the conclusion that she lived "a life of constant failure through timidity."

De Ville also took an interest in the heads of criminals, such as François Benjamin Courvoisier. He had a cast of the head of Daniel Good (provenance not clear), another convicted murderer who was convicted in 1842.

In the mid-1830s De Ville lectured on phrenology at Sass's Academy, where William Powell Frith was in his audience. In 1840 he became a member of the Phrenological Association. He resigned in 1842 on the schism among British phrenologists. It occurred when William Collins Engledue (1813–1858), in a speech before the Association, announced that phrenology and materialism were the same.

== Death and legacy ==
De Ville's casts were distributed throughout the world; and some are extant in the collection of the Edinburgh School of Anatomy. De Ville & Co. was carried on by his son-in-law William Matthews.

== Bibliography ==
- Outlines of Phrenology, as an accompaniment to the Phrenological Bust (1824).
- Manual of Phrenology as an accompaniment to the Phrenological Bust (1826, 1828, 1831, 1841).
- 'Account of a number of cases in which a change had been produced on the form of the head by education and moral training-Phrenological Association, Glasgow', Phrenological Journal, 14 (1841) pp. 32–8.
- Browne, James P., "Memoir of the late Mr James De Ville", Phrenological Journal, 19, 1846, pp. 329–344.
- "Mr De Ville's Collection", Phrenological Journal, 14 (1841), pp. 19–23
- Cooter, R., Phrenology in the British Isles: An Annotated, Historical Bibliography and Index (1989).
- Pückler-Muskau, Briefe eines Verstorbenen: Ein fragmentarisches Tagebuch aus Deutschland, Holland, England, Wales, Irland und Frankreich, geschrieben in den Jahren 1826 bis 1829 (1830).

== Family ==
De Ville married in 1797 Jane Smith, and they had five children, including sons William and George, daughters Emily and Jane, who married William Matthews, and a further daughter.
