= The Retreat =

Psychiatric hospital in York, England

The Retreat York
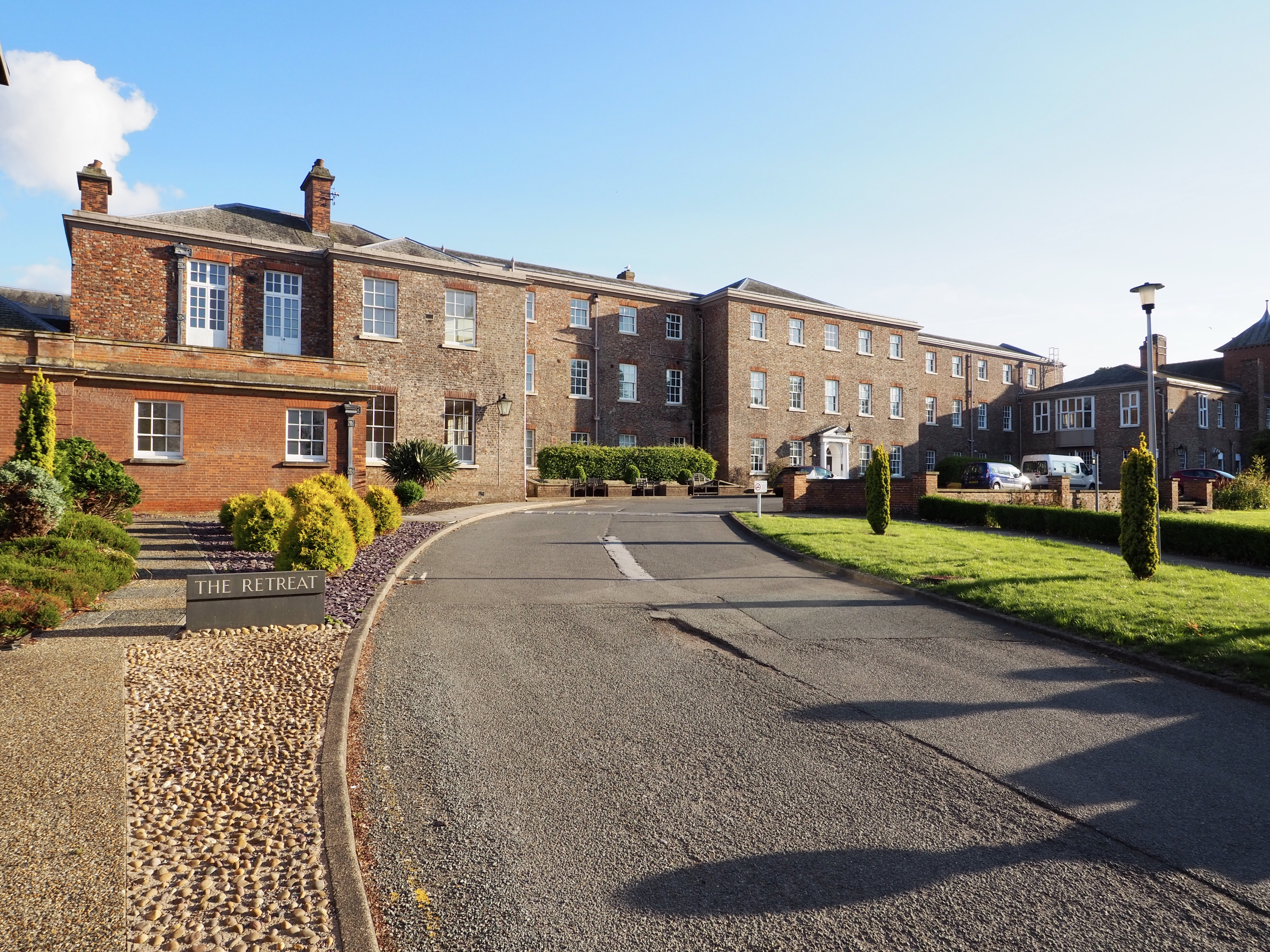
- The Retreat in 2023

- Showing site of York Retreat in North Yorkshire

Geography
- Location: Heslington Road, Lamel Hill, York, England
- Coordinates: 53.950972°N 1.063125°W

Organisation
- Type: Specialist

Services
- Speciality: Psychiatry

History
- Founded: 1796; 230 years ago
- Closed: December 2018

Listed Building – Grade II*
- Official name: The Retreat and boundary walls
- Designated: 14 June 1954
- Reference no.: 1257679

Links
- Lists: Hospitals in England

The Retreat, commonly known as the York Retreat, was a place in England, established in 1796, for the treatment of people with mental health needs. Located in Lamel Hill in York, it operated as a not for profit charitable organisation. In December 2018, The Retreat withdrew from the delivery of inpatient services after over 200 years.

Opened in 1796, it is famous for having pioneered the so-called "moral treatment" that became a behaviour model for asylums around the world with mental health issues. Founded by William Tuke, it was originally only for Quakers but gradually became open to everyone. It inspired other progressive facilities such as the US Brattleboro Retreat, Hartford Retreat and Friends Hospital. The modern-day The Retreat had retained the essence of early "moral treatment", while applying the principles to a modern healthcare setting. The Retreat withdrew from the delivery of inpatient services, after 222 years, in late December 2018.

== History ==
=== Background ===
The York Retreat developed from the English Quaker community both as a reaction against the harsh, inhumane treatment common to other asylums of that era, and as a model of Quaker therapeutic beliefs. A common belief at the time was that the mad were wild beasts. The recommended medical practices included debilitating purges, painful blistering, long-term immobilisation by manacles, and sudden immersion in cold baths – all administered in regimes of fear, terror and brutality. But the Quakers maintained that the humanity and inner light of a person could never be extinguished. A trigger was the death in 1790 of a Quaker, Hannah Mills, a few weeks after she had been admitted to the York Asylum (now known as Bootham Park Hospital). The asylum had not let her friends or family visit her. This situation brought several concerns about the condition of Hannah's death. Therefore, this led William Tuke to think about The Retreat as a place where people should be treated equally. However, visiting afterwards to investigate the conditions, the Quakers found that the patients were treated worse than animals.

=== Beginnings ===
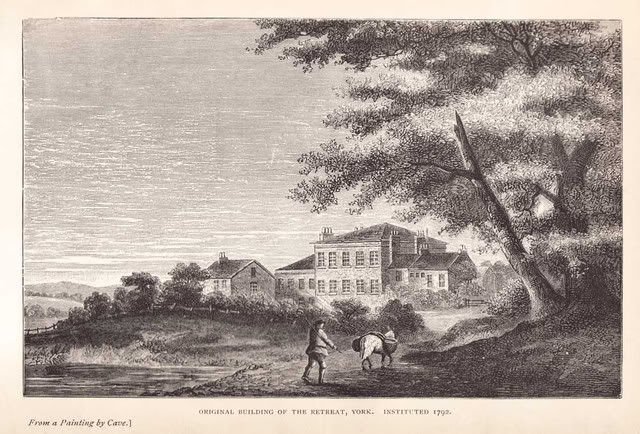
York Retreat original building c. 1796

Quaker William Tuke was enlisted and took charge of a project to develop a new form of asylum. His family enjoyed the tea and coffee merchant business. He appealed to Quakers, personal acquaintances and physicians for funds. He spent two years in discussion with, and issuing explanatory statements to the local Quaker group (York Monthly Meeting), working out the fundamental principles of the proposed institution. Tuke and his personal physician, Timothy Maud, educated themselves about the current views on "madness" and its treatment. Tuke's conviction, however, was in the importance of benevolence and a comfortable living environment encouraging reflection. Tuke also worked with architect John Bevans to design the new building.

The Retreat opened in 1796 in the countryside outside York. It was planned to take in about 30 people but started with just three, then eight. Unlike mental institutions of the time, there were no chains or manacles, and physical punishment was banned. Treatment was based on personalised attention and benevolence, restoring the self-esteem and self-control of residents. An early example of occupational therapy was introduced, including walks and farm labouring in pleasant and quiet surroundings. There was a social environment where residents were seen as part of a large family-like unit, built on kindness, moderation, order and trust. There was a religious dimension, including prayer. Inmates were accepted as potentially rational beings who could recover proper social conduct through self-restraint and moral strength. They were permitted to wear their own clothing, and encouraged to engage in handicrafts, to write, and to read books. They were allowed to wander freely around The Retreat's courtyards and gardens, which were stocked with various small domestic animals.

==== The design ====
There was some minimal use of restraint. The design for the facility was to accommodate the patient by gender in separate bedrooms in a way specific to that patient treatment. Door locks were encased in leather, the bars on windows made to look like window frames, and the extensive gardens included a sunken wall that was impassable yet barely visible. Straitjackets were sometimes used, at least initially, as a threat or a last resort. There was little formal medical involvement and an apothecary, Thomas Fowler, served as physician. He gave the standard medical treatments "ample trial" but reluctantly and "courageously" abandoned them as failures. Fowler worked with George Jepson, the first superintendent of The Retreat, and the two gradually concluded that the use of usual fear tactics actually made patients worse, and allaying patient's fears helped them. Jepson was said to have been authoritative yet patient, attentive, observant, kind, and open to new ideas in spite of his limited formal medical training. He arrived at the same time as a talented Quaker nurse Katherine Allen, and the two married in 1806; they then headed The Retreat together.

==== The moral treatment ====
The approach of The Retreat was widely derided at first. William Tuke noted that "All men seem to desert me." However, it became a model around the world for more humane and psychologically based approaches. The work was taken on by other Quakers, including Tuke's son Henry Tuke who co-founded The Retreat, and Samuel Tuke who helped popularise the approach which convince physicians to adopt it in his 1813, book Description of The Retreat near York. His book explained in detail about the approach to use the moral treatment method for restoring the self-esteem, and self-control in individual with mental issues. In doing so, Samuel Tuke popularised his use of the term moral treatment that he had borrowed from the French "traitement moral" being used to describe the work of Pussin and Pinel in France (and in the original French referring to morale in the sense of the emotions and self-esteem, rather than rights and wrongs). The term came to refer to a number of moves towards more humane approaches that occurred toward the end of the 18th century in the context of Enlightenment thinking, including also the work of Vincenzo Chiarugi in Italy. Ideas of "moral" management were incorporated, and used for various therapeutic and custodial purposes, in asylums and therapeutic communities around the world.

The Retreat states that it provides mental healthcare that is unique to the person and values highly its original ethos. Although you do not have to have any connection to the Quakers to work at or receive healthcare from the Retreat, it remains a Quaker ministry and has a Quaker Chaplain. The Yorkshire General Meeting of Friends suggests names for half of the Board of Trustee Directors. The burial ground of the York Friends Meeting House is in the grounds of the hospital.

=== Growth and change ===
Quaker as Friends Asylum in 1813, gained trust from the United States of America and had the opportunity to open the first private Friends Hospital which was a mental health facility on Philadelphia. During that time it was difficult to treat and impossible to cure mental health problems. In addition, Samuel's book with his explanation about the moral treatment gained trust from the community, and helped to raise money for the hospital.

The abolitionist, John Candler, was appointed Superintendent in 1841. However the Lunacy Act 1845 necessitated the appointment of a medically qualified superintendent and in 1846 the John Thurnam was appointed. Moral therapy was gradually replaced by medication, special diets and hydrotherapy. The size of the institution grew and the formerly close-knit community ethos was left behind. In addition, both Quaker influence and the number of Quaker patients decreased through the century. After the initial period for which it is best known, therefore, there were marked changes in management, therapy and client groups.

Between 1880 and 1884, most patients of The Retreat were under 50, single, and non-Quaker. A majority have been assessed today as having met criteria for a diagnosis of schizophrenia or a mood disorder. The majority experienced delusions, with the most common being of persecution, grandeur and guilt, while about a third had religious content. Just under a third of patients were suicidal. Drug therapy was commonly prescribed. Just over a third of patients had a history of assault on other patients or asylum staff. About a tenth of patients were force-fed at some stage during their stay. About a half of patients were discharged within a year of admission, with the prognosis being better for patients with a mood disorder than for schizophrenia, but just under a third remained in the asylum for five or more years.

As key people in the history of The Retreat, the names of Katherine Allen and George Jepson were given to two units at the hospital.

=== 1952 air incident ===
A Gloster Meteor WH342 from 66 Squadron at RAF Linton-on-Ouse crashed at The Retreat on Friday 29 February 1952. Pilot Officer John Speirs Paterson (1 March 1927 – 29 February 1952), from Waterworks House in Farewell and Chorley in Staffordshire, died in the crash. He attended the King Edward Grammar School in Lichfield, and the University of Cambridge. The tail landed in the cemetery and the body tore the roof off part of the building, but there were no casualties among the patients or staff.

== Current services ==
The Retreat continued to operate as an independent hospital into the modern era. However, on 31 December 2018, it withdrew from inpatient care with its remaining services for eating disorders and personality disorders now being run by the Schoen Clinic. The Retreat continues to run outpatient community psychological assessment, diagnostic and therapy services at the Tuke Centre, including an Autism and ADHD service.

== Notable figures ==
- Joseph Rowntree and Samuel Tuke (grandson of William Tuke) are buried in the Quaker cemetery found within the grounds.
- Aubrey Hopwood (1863–1917), lyricist and author, died there.

== See also ==
- Grade II* listed buildings in the City of York
- History of psychiatric institutions
- Listed buildings in York (outside the city walls, southern part)
- Mental health care
- Quakers in Britain
