= John Thurnam =

John Thurnam (28 December 1810 – 24 September 1873) was an English psychiatrist, archaeologist, and ethnologist. In 1846 he was appointed Medical Superintendent of The Retreat, the Quaker psychiatric hospital near York. In 1848 he reported two maternal first cousins with an unusual condition affecting the skin, hair and teeth (an ectodermal dysplasia); he had performed an examination post mortem on one of the two men, including relevant histopathology.

== Life ==
Thurnam was born at Lingcroft, near Copmanthorpe, York to the Quaker William Thurnam and his wife Sarah Clark.

After a private education he became a member of the Royal College of Surgeons in 1834, a licentiate of the Royal College of Physicians in 1843, and a fellow in 1859. He graduated M.D. at the University of Aberdeen in 1846.

Having served as resident medical officer in the Westminster Hospital from 1834 till 1838, Thurnam was appointed medical superintendent of the Friends' retreat in York. That post he held until 1849. The Wiltshire county asylum at Devizes was then being built, and the committee selected Thurnam to be medical superintendent. It was opened in 1851, and he remained in active charge until his death.

Thurnam's leisure was devoted to statistical facts on mental illness and investigations of anthropological and antiquarian interest. He was twice elected president of the Medico-Psychological Association.

Thurnam died at Devizes . On 18 June 1851 he had married Frances Elizabeth, daughter of Matthew Wyatt, a metropolitan police magistrate, and sister of Sir Matthew Digby Wyatt. By her he left three sons.

== Works ==
While at the Westminster Hospital he had gained some reputation from his observations on aneurysm of the heart. In 1843 he published ‘Observations and Essays on the Statistics of Insanity, and on Establishments for the Insane.’ This work contained a reprint of the ‘Statistics of the York Retreat,’ first issued in 1841, together with a historical and descriptive sketch.

After his move to Wiltshire he gave special consideration to craniology. Thurnam with Dr. Joseph Barnard Davis published a work in two volumes under the title of Crania Britannica in 1865, important for craniometry. Thurnam and Davis were both believers in polygenism, in the form that different races had been created separately. Davis was a collector of craniums, and had over 1700 specimens. Because of the racial differences of the craniums, Davis and Thurnam believed that proofs of polygenism were to be found in studying the skull types of different races. From different sizes and types of skull they deduced separate origins.

Two shorter papers were ‘Synostoses of the Cranial Bones regarded as a Race Character’ (Nat. Hist. Rev. 1865), and ‘Weight of the Human Brain’ (Journ. of Ment. Science, 1868). Thurnam recognised the importance of the obliteration of the sutures of the skull, which he had observed in the dolichocephalous crania of the Stone Age, but not in the brachycephalous crania of the bronze period. His conclusion was that this is a strictly race character.
