= List of Ferrero International brands =

Ferrero International is the holding company of the Italian multinational confectionery and consumer food manufacturer Ferrero. Ferrero International's portfolio is composed of the core Ferrero Group (Ferrero S.p.A. and its directly owned divisions, such as Kinder, WK Kellogg Co, and Wells Enterprises) and a number of separately managed affiliate companies (such as Ferrara Candy Company, Carambar & Co, and Fox's Burton's Companies). Ferrero's portfolio of brands includes chocolate confectionery; sugar confectionery and mints; biscuits and baked snacks; breakfast cereals; ice cream and frozen desserts; beverages; spreads; and snack and nutrition bars.

== Chocolate confectionery ==
- 100 Grand
- Baby Ruth
- Butterfinger
- Chunky
- Crunch
- Duplo
- Fannie May
- Ferrero Rocher
- Ferrero Tronky
- Ferrero-Küsschen
- Fiesta
- Giotto
- Goobers
- Hanuta
- Kinder
- Kinder Bueno
- Kinder Chocolate
- Kinder Happy Hippo
- Kinder Joy
- Kinder Pingui
- Kinder Surprise
- Mon Chéri
- Oh Henry
- Pocket Coffee
- Poulain
- Raffaello
- Raisinets
- SnoCaps
- Suchard
- Terry's
- Thorntons
- Yogurette

== Sugar confectionery and mints ==
- Atomic Fireballs
- Black Forest
- Bolete
- Boston Baked Beans
- Bottle Caps
- Brach's
- Carambar
- Chuckles
- Deliket
- Disqueti
- Dori
- Fun Dip
- Funables
- Gobstopper
- Gomets
- Jelly Belly
- Jubes
- Jujyfruits
- Kréma
- LUA CHEIA
- La Pie Qui Chante
- Laffy Taffy
- Lemonhead
- Lutti
- Michoko
- Nerds
- Nerds Gummy Clusters
- Now & Later
- Pettiz
- Pixy Stix
- Rain-Blo
- Red Hots
- Runts
- Spree
- Stretch Island
- SweeTARTS
- Tic Tac
- Trolli
- Vichy
- Vichy Pastilles
- Yogurte 100 Original

== Biscuits and baked snacks ==
- Crunch Creams
- Delacre
- Délichoc
- Famous Amos
- Ferrero Brioss
- Fox's Biscuits
- Jammie Dodgers
- Keebler
- Kelsen
- Kjeldsens
- La Dolce Vita
- Little Brownie Bakers
- Maryland
- Michel et Augustin
- Mother's
- Murray
- Nonni's
- Party Rings
- Paterson's
- Riberhus
- Rocky
- Royal Dansk
- Skinny Cookies
- Thomas Fudge
- Viscount
- Wagon Wheels

== Breakfast cereals ==
- All-Bran
- Apple Jacks
- Bear Naked
- Corn Flakes
- Corn Pops
- Cracklin OatBran
- Crispix
- Froot Loops
- Frosted Flakes
- Frosted Mini-Wheats
- Honey Smacks/Smacks
- Kashi
- Krave
- Raisin Bran
- Rice Krispies
- Special K
- Vector

== Ice cream and frozen desserts ==
- Blue Bunny Ice Cream
- Blue Ribbon Classics
- Bomb Pop
- Halo Top Creamery

== Beverages ==
- Estathè

== Spreads ==
- Nutella

== Snack and nutrition bars ==
- Bold
- Eat Natural
- Fulfil
- Power Crunch
- Purely Elizabeth

== See also ==
- Ferrero SpA
