= Kinder =

Kinder is the German word for "children"; it may also refer to:

== Businesses ==
- Kinder (brand), a trademark of Ferrero, an Italian confectioner:
  - Kinder Surprise
  - Kinder Chocolate bars
  - Kinder Happy Hippo
  - Kinder Bueno
  - Kinder Joy
- Kinder Morgan Energy Partners, a United States energy company

== People ==
- Kinder (surname), includes a list of people with the name
- Kinder (given name), includes a list of people with the name

== Places ==
United Kingdom

- Kinder Scout, a moorland plateau in Northern England
  - Kinder, Derbyshire, a township in the ancient parish of Glossop in England
- The River Kinder, a tributary of the River Sett, Derbyshire

United States

- Kinder, Indiana, a village
- Kinder, Louisiana, a town
- Kinder, Missouri, an unincorporated community
- Kinder, West Virginia, an unincorporated community

== Other uses ==
- Kinder (goat), a breed of goat
- MV Kinder, a British coastal tanker
- Virtus Pallacanestro Bologna, known as Kinder Bologna between 1996 and 2002
- Kinder Foundation, non-profit organisation, gives grants to projects based in Houston, Texas
- Kinder House, a historic house in Auckland, New Zealand
- Die Kinder, British TV series
- Kinder Reservoir, a body of water in Derbyshire, England

== See also ==
- "Kinder, Küche, Kirche", a German slogan
- Wunderkind
- Kindergarten
