= William Salice =

Italian businessman (1933–2016)

- Salice in 2009
- Born: 18 July 1933; Casei Gerola, Lombardy, Italy
- Died: 29 December 2016 (aged 83); Pavia, Lombardy, Italy
- Occupation: Businessperson
- Known for: Creating Kinder eggs

William Salice ("sah-lee-chee"; 18 July 1933 – 29 December 2016) was an Italian businessman. He was employed at Ferrero SpA, where he was credited as the inventor of Kinder Eggs.

== Life and career ==
Salice was born on 18 July 1933, in the Italian comune of Casei Gerola. He began working at Ferrero in 1960, and eventually became a close collaborator of the company's owner, Michele Ferrero.

He thought up the concept of Kinder Surprise Eggs in the late sixties, while researching alternative uses for the manufacturer's easter egg chocolate moulds, which went unused most of the year. Despite this, he insisted on referring to Michele Ferrero as the inventor, claiming to merely be the idea's "material executor". Kinder Eggs were launched in 1974.

Salice also played a part in the creation of several other Ferrero products, such as Ferrero Rocher and Pocket Coffee.

After his retirement in 2007, Salice co-founded the Color Your Life Foundation, alongside Italian entrepreneur Enrico Gasperini. It provides free courses for young aspiring entrepreneurs.

Salice died on 29 December 2016, in the town of Pavia, after suffering a stroke. He was 83.
