= Ferrero-Küsschen =

Chocolate brand

Ferrero Küsschen

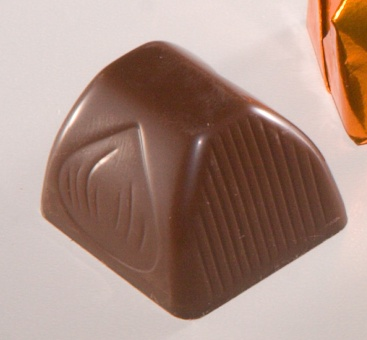
- Product type: Bonbon
- Current owner: Ferrero SpA
- Country: Italy
- Introduced: 1968; 58 years ago

Ferrero Küsschen (German for "little kisses") are Ferrero company chocolates that consist of a whole roasted hazelnut filled with hazelnut cream including vegetable oil and covered in milk chocolate.

== Ingredients ==
The chocolate consists of milk chocolate 31% (sugar, cocoa mass, cocoa butter, whole milk powder, butter oil, emulsifier lecithin (soy), vanillin), hazelnut (27%), dark chocolate 15% (sugar, cocoa mass, cocoa butter, emulsifier lecithin (soy), vanillin), vegetable oil, sugar, protein enriched whey powder, low fat cocoa and vanilla.

== Sales ==
Ferrero Küsschen were launched in 1968. The box consists of 5 or 32 pieces. Gift boxes come with 14 or 20 chocolate packets.

Earlier Ferrero used to vend the same chocolates under the name Mon Chéri in the USA. In Germany and in Italy chocolates called Mon Chéri are still sold, but the candy is very different: instead of a hazelnut they are filled with a cherry.

== Controversy ==
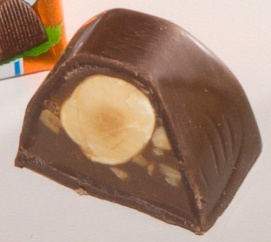
Opened Ferrero Küsschen

Ferrero pulled an advertising campaign in Germany in 2013 for a white chocolate version of Ferrero Küsschen that featured the slogan "Germany votes White".

Ferrero, an Italian brand, withdrew the ads, which some claimed to be timed to coincide with the German political elections, after furious Germans compared them to propaganda for Germany's far right, anti-immigrant NPD party.

The advert promoted the white Ferrero Küsschen, which had previously only been available seasonally in Germany. Created by ad giant M&C Saatchi, the ad featured a giant, talking chocolate box telling supporters at a rally: "We want white Ferrero Küsschen forever." The supporters held placards reading "Yes Weiss Can", meaning Yes White Can – a play on Barack Obama's famous campaign slogan "Yes We Can" – while a poster is unfurled reading "Germany Votes White".

The advert provoked outrage on social media.

"It is important for us to clearly stress that we are strictly against any form of xenophobia, right-extremism or racism," Ferrero said in a statement. "All of our assertions were purely about white chocolate – and without xenophobic intent. We regret that the commercial was misunderstood and the product messaging was otherwise construed."

The ads, which appeared as Germany responded to rising refugee arrivals amid far right protests, are in contrast to the runaway success of Ferrero's 1990s ads for its Rocher chocolates, which featured a waiter toting a tray of chocolates around an ambassador's reception.

== Advertising ==
Ferrero Kisses (Küsschen) are well known for their slogan: "Give a Küsschen to your friend!"
