= Maryland Cookies =

Brand of British biscuit

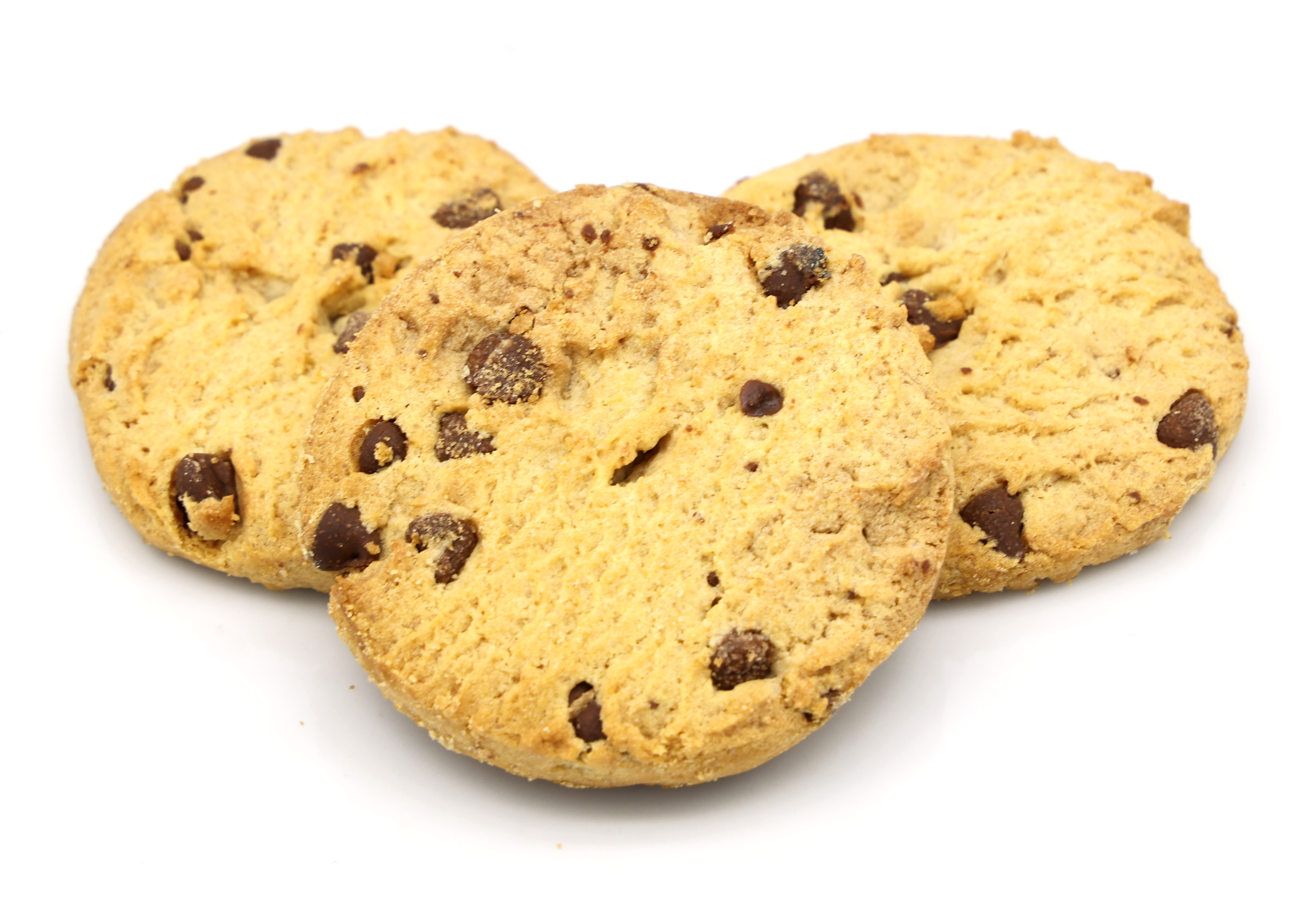
Choc chip Maryland Cookies

Maryland Cookies are a brand name of cookie produced by Burton's Biscuit Company in the United Kingdom.

== Background information ==
Maryland Cookies were first produced in 1956 by Lyons through its Blackpool subsidiary, Symbol Biscuits. At the end of 1994, Lyons Biscuits was sold to Hillsdown Holdings, which was acquired in 1999 by Hicks Muse Tate & Furst. Horizon Biscuits, owned by HMTF, manufactured Maryland Cookies, and following HMTF’s acquisition of Burton’s Foods in 2000, the two businesses were merged. Maryland Cookies subsequently took on Burton's branding. In 2021 Burton's was bought by the Ferrero Group. According to Burton’s, Maryland is among the UK’s best-selling cookie brands. According to a 2019 report in Wales Online, over 12 billion Maryland Cookies are sold within Europe each year. The recipe for Maryland Cookies resembles a chocolate chip shortbread.
