= Choco Treasure =

Chocolate confectionery with toys

Choco Treasure was a confectionery product created and distributed by Candy Treasure LLC in 2010. Intended for children aged three years and older, it consisted of a chocolate egg containing a yellow capsule. Similar to Kinder Surprise, the capsule contained a toy, but featured a seam around its exterior.

== See also ==
- List of confectionery brands
