= Pocket Coffee =

Brand of confectionery

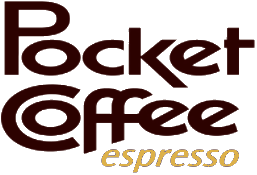

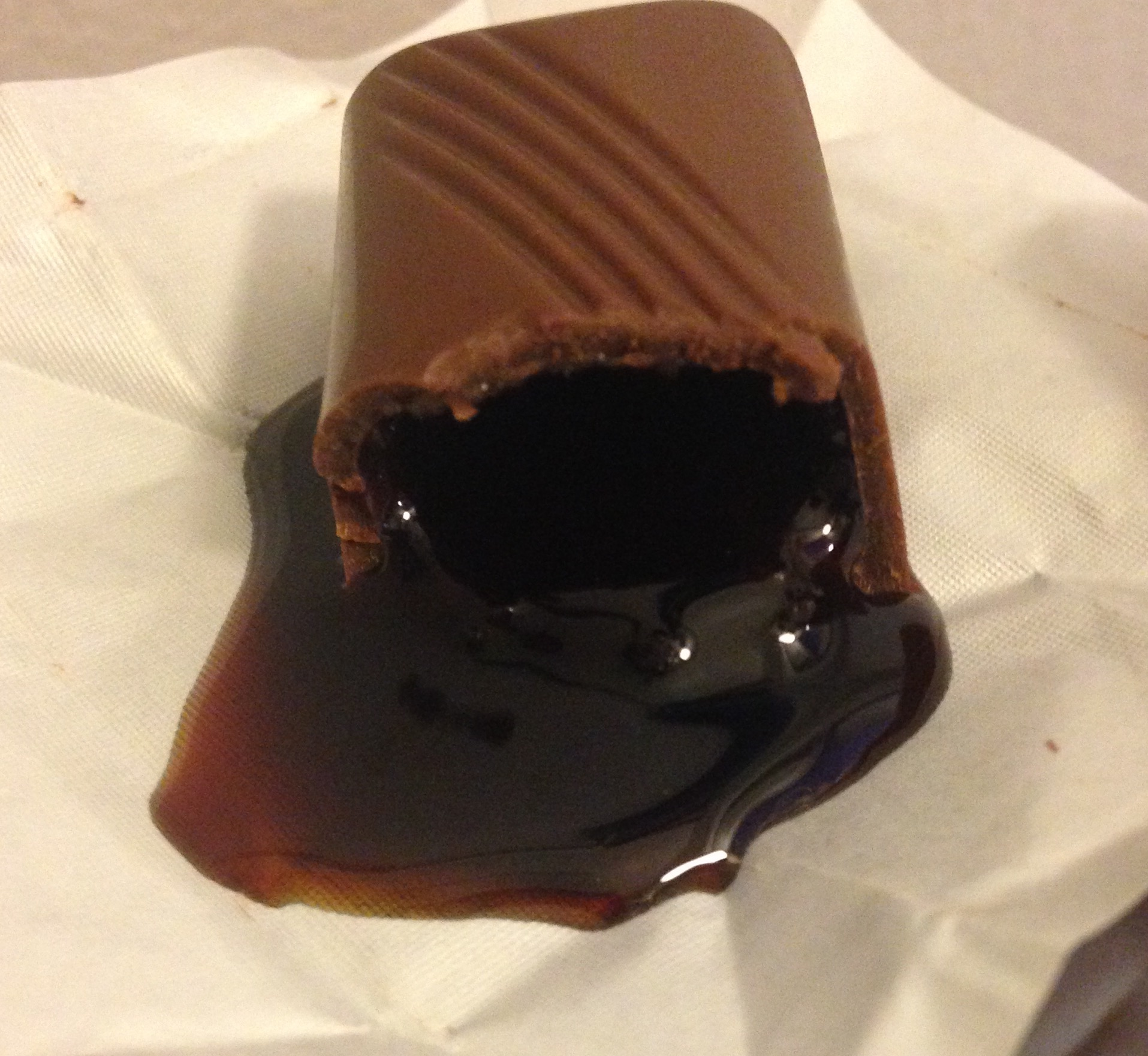
- Opened Pocket Coffee
- Product type: Bonbon
- Current owner: Ferrero SpA
- Country: Italy
- Introduced: 1968; 58 years ago
- Website: ferrero.it/pocketcoffee

Nutritional info
Nutritional value per 100 g (3.5 oz)
- Energy: 1,842 kJ (440 kcal)
- Carbohydrates: 58.8 g (sugar 56.6 g)
- Fat: 20.5 g
- Protein: 4.0 g
- ^{†}Percentages estimated using US recommendations for adults.

Pocket Coffee is a brand of the Ferrero company for a chocolate confectionery, sold internationally. First marketed in Italy in 1968, each Pocket Coffee is an individually wrapped shell of dark chocolate containing liquid espresso. As with Ferrero's Rocher, Mon Chéri, and Raffaello, production limits sales from November to April.

William Salice, assistant to Ferrero's owner, Michele Ferrero, conceived the product in the early 1960s after noticing no bars at Italy's then relatively new Autogrills, a proprietary eponym synonymous with Italian highway rest stops. Ferrero conceived a product for anyone working long hours, e.g., truck drivers. Michele Ferrero conceived the slogan: "the energy of chocolate and the charge of coffee".

== Ingredients ==
- Coffee (sweetened liquid)
- Chocolate (paste)
- Chocolate milk
- Cocoa butter
- Cocoa paste
- Lactose

== Availability ==
Pocket Coffee is sold widely in Italy, with Ferrero headquarters in Alba, Piedmont; Germany is the second largest market. In the 70's it was easily available in shops in France as well.

For many years, it was difficult to obtain Pocket Coffee outside Europe, but the product is available online and in certain major food markets.
