= Burton's Biscuit Company =

British biscuit manufacturer

- Type: Subsidiary
- Founded: 1935; 91 years ago
- Founder: Joseph Burton
- Headquarters: St Albans, United Kingdom
- Area served: Worldwide
- Parent: FBC (Ferrero)
- Website: burtonsbiscuits.com

Burton's Biscuit Company is a British biscuit manufacturer. It is recognised in the United Kingdom as the second-biggest supplier of biscuits. The company was formed by the merger of Burton's Gold Medal Biscuits and Horizon Biscuit Company in October 2000. It re-branded from Burton's Foods to Burton's Biscuit Company in November 2011. It employs over 2,200 people around the UK, in three main manufacturing facilities, Llantarnam, Edinburgh and Blackpool, a chocolate refinery in Moreton, and a central distribution hub in Liverpool. Its head office is in St Albans.

Burton's is the UK's second biggest biscuit maker and many of its products are sold globally.

== History ==
The first Burton's biscuits were baked by George Burton (born 1829, Leek, Staffordshire), who began production on Corporation Street, Blackpool, Lancashire. The Burton's Biscuits firm was founded by George's grandson, Joseph Burton, in 1935. It had a factory in Slough, Berkshire, until the early 1980s, manufacturing potato crisps and snacks, including Potato Puffs and Fish 'n' Chips savoury snacks. In 2014, Burton's re-launched their Fish 'n' Chips snacks due to popular demand.

In 2000, the business was sold by Associated British Foods to Hicks Muse Tate & Furst. On 18 March 2007, Burton's was acquired by Duke Street Capital. In September 2009, Burton's came under the new ownership of Canadian Imperial Bank of Commerce and Apollo Global Management, with a minority stake held by Duke Street.

The Llantarnam factory

In 2013, the company was put up for sale, with an asking price around £350m. In November of that year, it was announced that the company had been bought by the Ontario Teachers' Pension Plan.

In 2016, Burton's sold its licence to make Cadbury-branded biscuits to Mondelēz International (the owners of Cadbury), although they are still made in Burton's factories.

In June 2021, it was announced that the company had been bought by the Ferrero SpA.

== Brands ==
- Jammie Dodgers
- Lyons Biscuits
  - Lyons Coconut Delights
  - Lyons Cookies
  - Lyons Digestive
  - Lyons Fig Rolls
  - Lyons Jam Teacakes
  - Lyons Toffypops
  - Viscount
- Maryland Cookies
- Royal Edinburgh
- Wagon Wheels

== See also ==
- Fox's Biscuits
- Huntley & Palmers
- Jacob Fruitfield Food Group and Jacob's
- Tunnock's
- United Biscuits
