= Royal Dansk =

Danish food brand

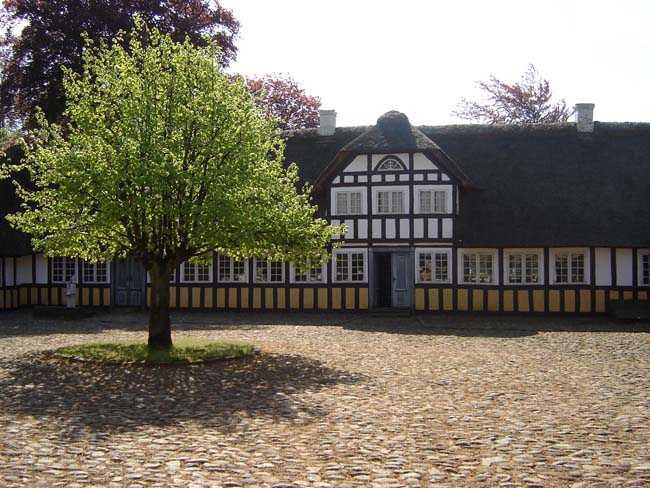
- The Hjemstavnsgaard farmhouse on the island of Funen, pictured in 2006
- Type: Subsidiary
- Industry: Food
- Founded: 1966; 60 years ago
- Fate: Merged with Kjeldsen to form Kelsen; Royal Dansk became a brand
- Headquarters: Helsingør, Denmark
- Products: Butter cookies
- Owner: Ferrero (2019–pres.); Campbell's (2013–19)
- Parent: Kelsen Group A/S
- Website: royal-dansk.com

Royal Dansk (meaning "Royal Danish") is a Danish brand of butter cookies, manufactured by Kelsen Group A/S. It is known for its distinctive royal blue round tin container. Since 2019, the brand is owned by Italian conglomerate Ferrero SpA, after it acquired the Kelsen Company for $300 million.

== History ==
The "Royal Dansk Company" was started in 1966 in Helsingør, Denmark. In 1990, it merged with another Danish biscuit producer, Kjeldsen, whose butter cookies were well known in Hong Kong and mainland China. Following the merger, the combined entity was renamed Kelsen, which was acquired by Campbell in 2013 and then sold to Italian manufacturer Ferrero in 2019 for $300 million.

In 2025, videos circulated on TikTok showing generic butter cookies sold in India under unsanitary conditions. Although none of the videos displayed Royal Dansk branding, some users speculated that the footage depicted products made by the company. In response, Royal Dansk issued a statement clarifying that its cookies are manufactured exclusively in Denmark at its bakeries in Nørre Snede and Ribe, and that the company produces more than 25,000 tonnes (25,000,000 kg) of cookies annually.

== Royal Dansk tin ==
Royal Dansk cookies are packaged in a blue tin featuring an illustration of the Hjemstavnsgaard farmhouse on the island of Funen in Denmark. The product is commonly associated with the holiday season, particularly in the United States, where it is frequently given as a Christmas gift. The tin itself has become a subject of popular culture due to its frequent reuse as a household storage container, particularly for sewing supplies or recipes. This practice has been widely documented in media and popular commentary and is often referenced humorously as a shared cultural experience.

The company has publicly acknowledged the reuse of its tins, stating that the long-term reuse of its tins contributes to its sustainability efforts.
