= Michel et Augustin =

French food brand

Vache à boire

Michel et Augustin (pronounced [miʃɛl e oɡystɛ̃]) is a French brand of food created in 2004 by Michel de Rovira and Augustin Paluel-Marmont, two ESCP-Europe alumni. Michel de Rovira attended HEC Paris, Grenoble School of Management and INSEAD Business School. Michel et Augustin has been owned by the Italian food-product corporation Ferrero since 2024.

The marketing target is French bobos and the products are sold in food stores and coffee shops. The communication of the brand is inspired by buddy brands such as Ben & Jerry's, Nantucket Nectars or Innocent Drinks, capitalizing on complicity with the customer.

== History ==
The brand started by producing flavored cookies (Petits sablés ronds et bons), and soon complemented its range with premium yogurt drinks (Vache à boire) and lassi. In 2007, it started to commercialize yogurt ice-creams. By 2009, they had over 60 stock keeping units.

Michel et Augustin opened a subsidiary in the USA in January 2015. The headquarters are based in Brooklyn, New York, but their cookie squares are sold nationwide, especially by Whole Foods, Delta Air Lines and company cafeterias, such as the Facebook and Google offices.

In September 2019, Sébastien Guillon became the new CEO of Michel et Augustin.

In December 2023, Ferrero announced it had entered into exclusive negotiations to acquire full ownership of Michel et Augustin.
