= Kinder Joy =

Chocolate egg manufactured by Ferrero

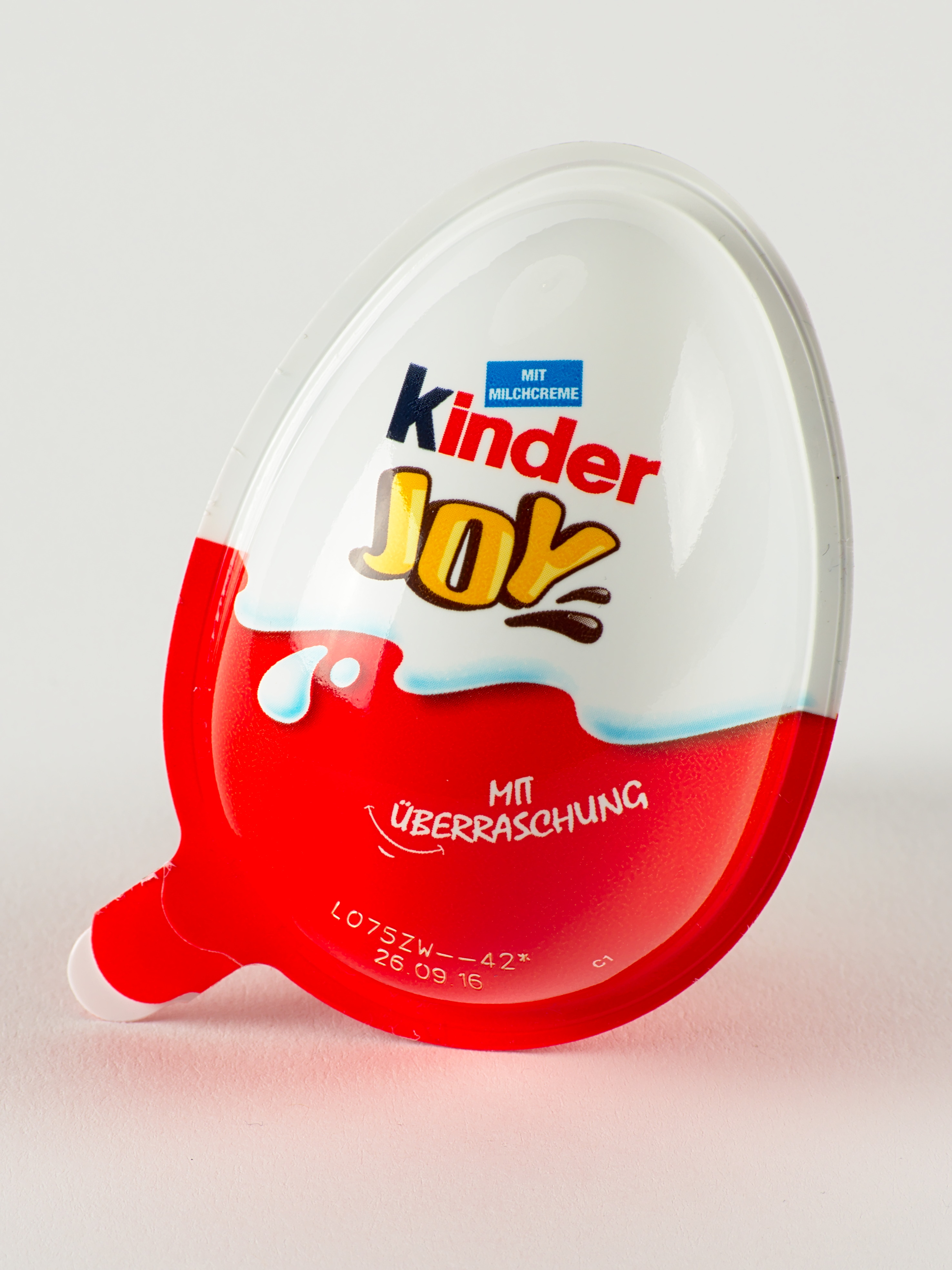
- A Kinder Joy egg
- Produced by: Ferrero
- Introduced: April 22, 2001; 25 years ago
- Related brands: Kinder Chocolate; Kinder Surprise
- Website: kinder.com/joy

Kinder Joy (formerly known as Kinder Merendero in Italy and Bahrain) is a candy made by Italian confectionery company Ferrero as part of its Kinder brand of products. It has plastic egg-shaped packaging that splits into two; one half contains layers of cocoa and milk cream topped with two wafer balls, and the other half contains a toy and a spoon on top of the wrapper. Kinder Joy was first launched in Italy in 2001 and as of 2018 was sold in 170 countries.

== Overview ==
Kinder Joy is a brand within the Kinder line of chocolate products sold by Ferrero. It has a plastic egg-shaped package with a tab to open it into two halves. One sealed half contains layers of cocoa and milk-flavoured creams topped with two cocoa wafer spheres, to be eaten with an included spoon. The other half contains a toy. As of 2015, Kinder Joy is produced in Poland, India, South Africa, Ecuador, Cameroon, and China. Its main ingredients include sugar, vegetable oils (palm and sunflower), milk, and wheat.

== History ==
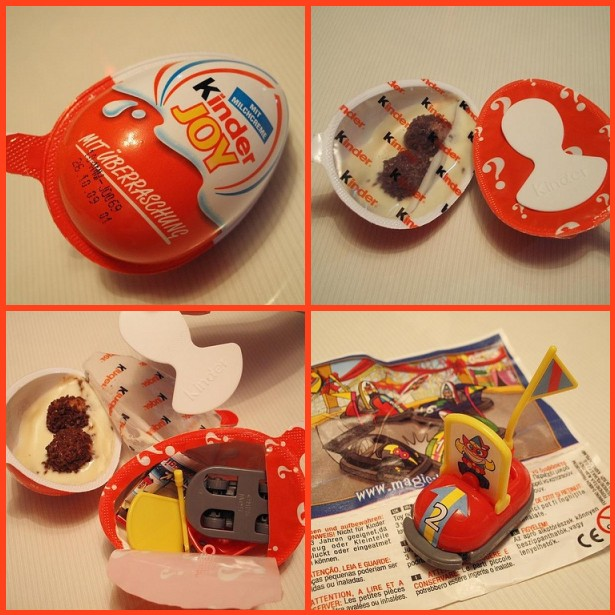
An old Kinder Joy egg's packaging, sealed halves, interior and toy

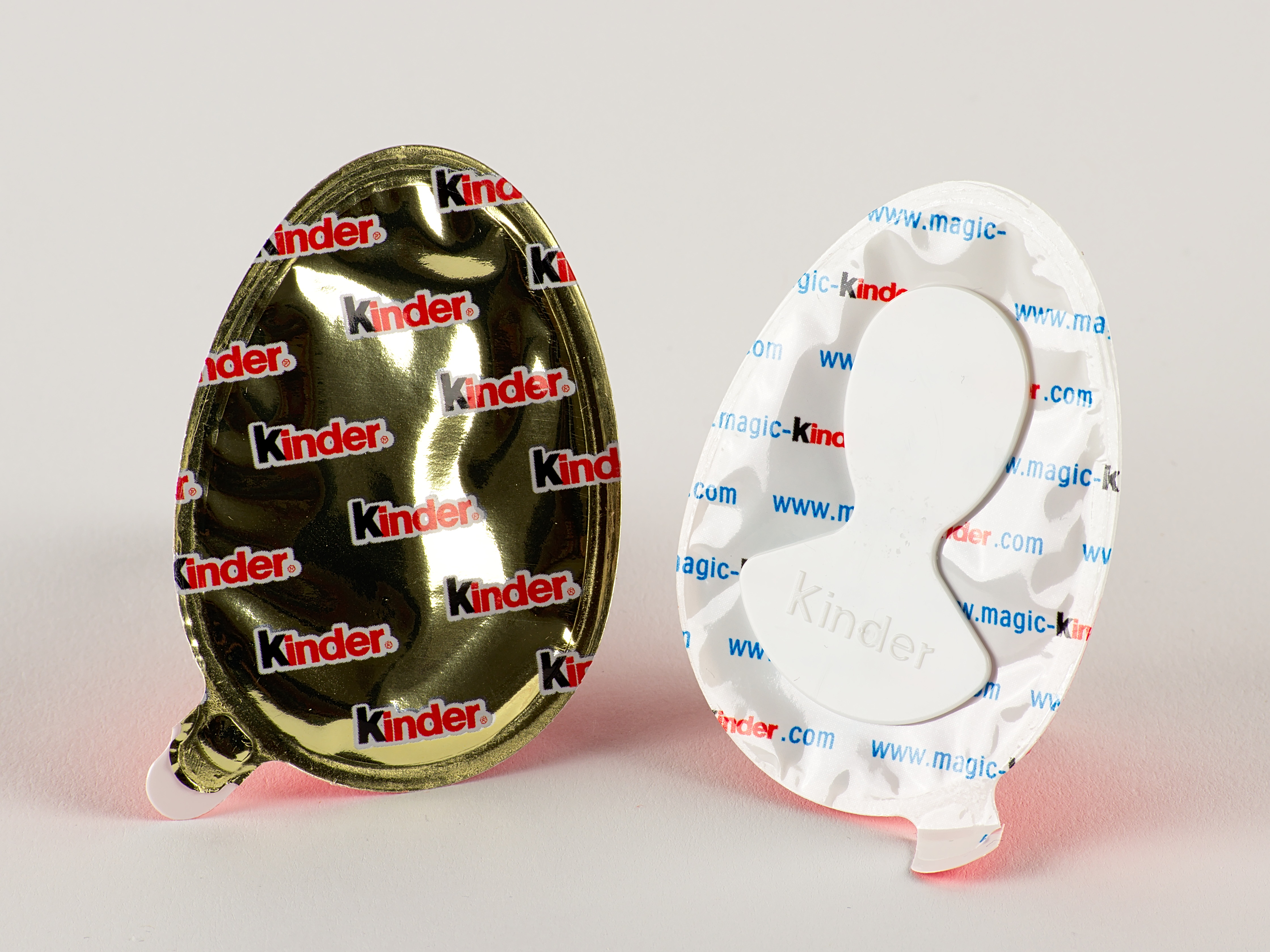
A Kinder Joy egg split into halves

Ferrero launched Kinder Joy in Italy in 2001. It has been sold in Spain since 2004, in Germany since May 2006 and in China and India since 2007. It was launched in Australia and the United States in 2018.

In 2011, Ferrero opened a factory in Baramati, India, to make the eggs, in addition to other products including Tic Tacs. In 2015, the company opened its first factory in China in the Xiaoshan district of Hangzhou, which produced Kinder Joy as its first manufacturing line. As of September 2015 Kinder Joy was one of the highest selling candy products in the Chinese market and had received Nielsen China's Breakthrough Innovation Award.

Kinder Joy became available in Ireland in 2015. Ferrero began to sell the eggs in the United Kingdom the same year in December.

Kinder Joy was launched in the United States in 2018 as its sister product by Kinder, Kinder Surprise, was banned in the U.S. by a federal law. Specifically, the Federal Food, Drug, and Cosmetic Act bans all food products that contain non-nutritive objects embedded within them. Kinder Joy solved this problem as the food and the toy are in two separate containers attached, allowing the product to follow the US guidelines and be sold in the country.

== Promotional collaborations and campaigns ==
Kinder Joy has partnered with entertainment brands for special limited edition toys and collectibles. Ferrero North America teamed up with Warner Bros. Discovery Global Consumer Products and Funco on an April 2024 collection of 16 products based on Harry Potter, such as bookmarks, pencil toppers and sticky notes.

Kinder Joy unveiled a limited edition Super Mario collection, in partnership with Nintendo, in December 2025. There were 26 themed toys and accessories in the collection.

UNIT9's collaboration with Netflix's Stranger Things and Funko debuted in 2025, bringing together collectible toys, digital and experiential promotion, such as an augmented-reality puzzle and live events.

=== Franchise collaborations ===
Kinder Joy has released promotional toy series based on several major entertainment franchises. These include collaborations with DC Comics characters, featuring miniature collectible figures inspired by superheroes such as Batman and Superman. In some markets, the toys were produced in partnership with Funko-style designs, encouraging collectors to obtain multiple figures from the series.

The brand has also introduced themed editions tied to other popular franchises, including Harry Potter and Stranger Things. These promotions included character-based collectibles and encouraged fans to collect the full sets of toys released during the campaign.

Such cross-promotional campaigns are intended to attract both children and collectors, leveraging recognizable characters from film and television to increase engagement with the Kinder Joy product line.

=== "Golden Batman" promotion ===
As part of the DC-themed campaign, Kinder Joy introduced a promotional contest in which certain packages contained a rare "Golden Batman" figurine. Consumers who found the golden collectible could enter a promotional contest for various prizes.

One of the most widely advertised rewards was the chance to win a trip to Australia, alongside additional DC-themed merchandise and collectibles distributed throughout the campaign.

The campaign was designed to create a "treasure hunt" style promotion, encouraging consumers to purchase multiple Kinder Joy products in hopes of discovering the rare figurine and participating in the contest.
