= Thorntons =

British confectionery company

Thorntons Ltd.

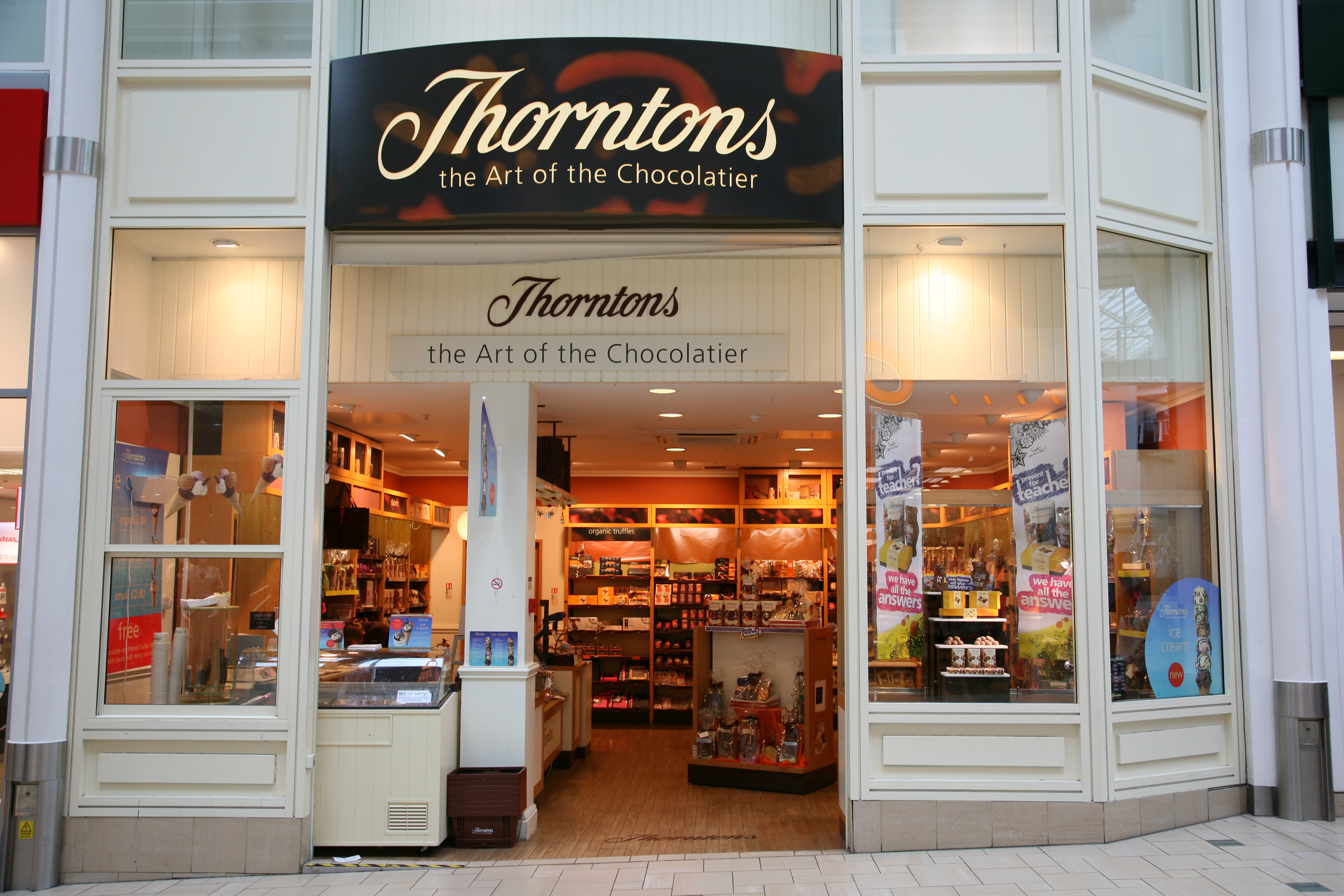
- Thorntons shop in Banbury, pictured in 2008
- Company type: Limited company
- Founded: 1911; 115 years ago) in Sheffield, England
- Founder: William Joseph Thornton
- Headquarters: Alfreton, Derbyshire, England
- Number of locations: ▼0 (all closed after Covid lockdowns in 2021) (Note: (all retail stores closed in 2021))
- Products: Bonbons, chocolate bars, toffees, fudges
- Revenue: ▼£135 million (2018)
- Operating income: ▼ – £38.3 million (2018)
- Net income: ▼ – £22.9 million (2018)
- Number of employees: ▼2,634
- Parent: Ferrero
- Website: thorntons.com

Thorntons Limited is a British chocolate manufacturer owned by the Italian confectionery company, Ferrero. It was established in 1911 by William Joseph Thornton and Joseph Thornton, his father, in Sheffield, Yorkshire, England.

When Cadbury became part of the Mondelez International predecessor Kraft Foods, Thorntons had become the largest confectionery-only parent company in Britain. The company was purchased by the Italian firm Ferrero in June 2015 for £112m.

Until and during the Second World War, the company was an established toffee and fudge maker. With post war rationing ending, the group's primary focus shifted to Belgian and Swiss-style chocolate in sets.

== History ==
=== The Thornton family ===
Thorntons began in Sheffield in 1911, the business being started by William Joseph Thornton (1870–1919), who co opened the company's first shop, at 159 Norfolk Street. William Norman Hinsby Thornton (1896–1984), his son, became the manager, at the age of just 15. Later in the company's history, Peter Thornton (grandson of the founder) served as chairman, but was dismissed from the role in June 1987.

=== 2009–present – trading difficulties ===
After rapid expansion, the results of 2009 showed turnover increasing to £214.8 million, but operating profit decreasing to £7.94 million. A perennial seasonality in sales disappointed strategists and employees. 35% of the sales were in the seven week period before Christmas, and 10%, shortly before Easter Sunday.

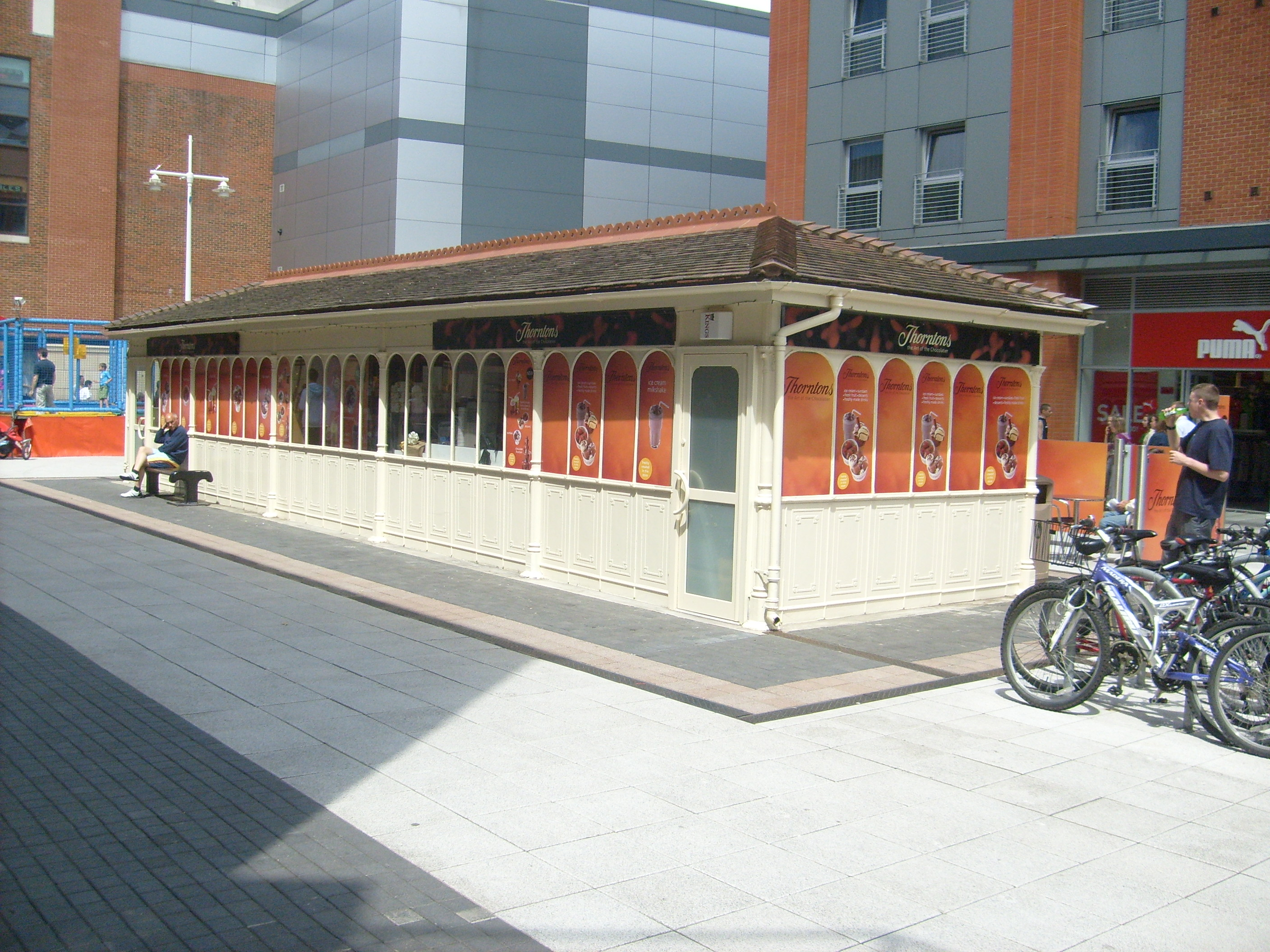
Former branch in a decorative tram shelter in Portsmouth

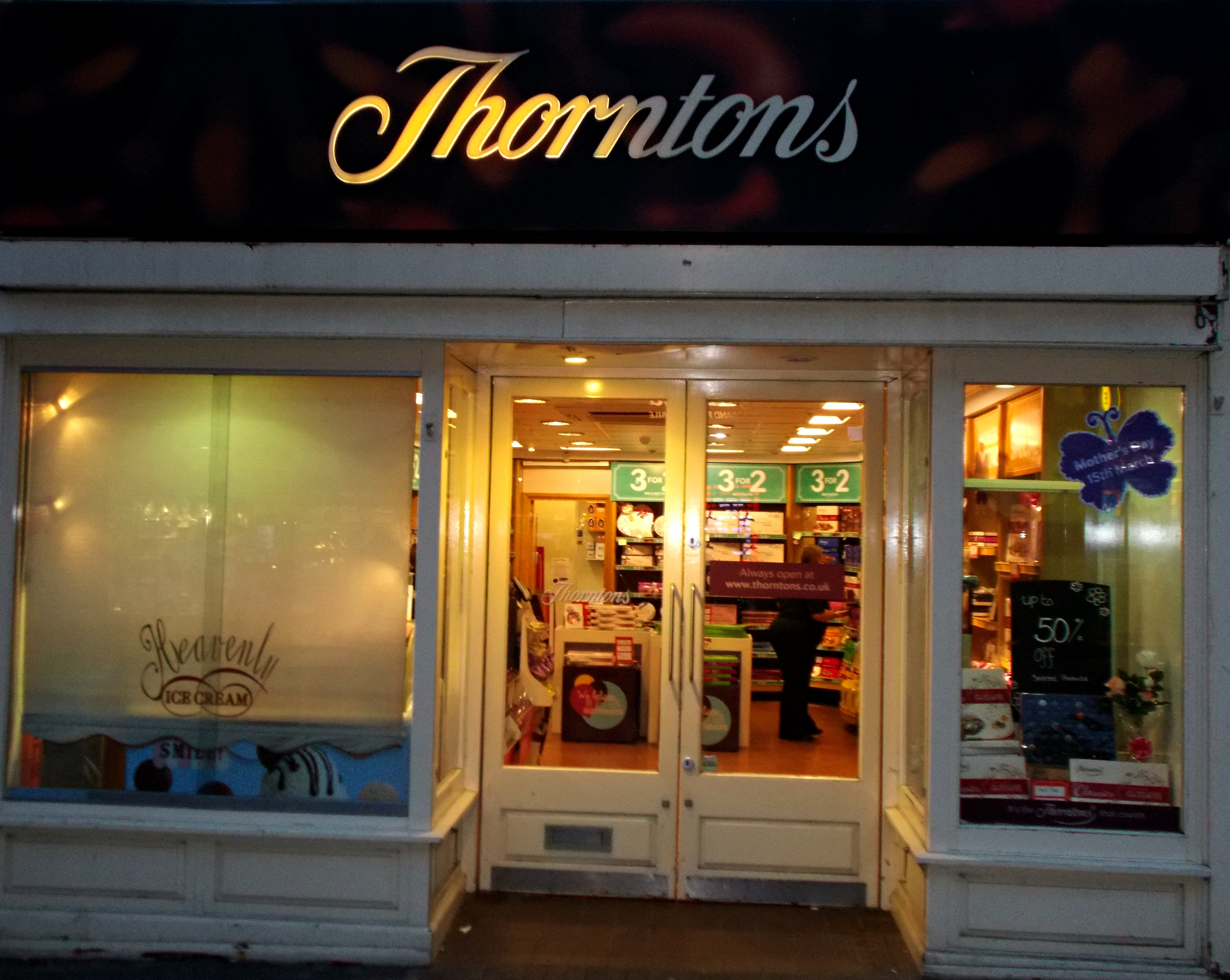
A Thorntons shop in London in 2015

The scale of impact of this, on manufacturing and service, are more pronounced than the average in the food sector, necessitating temporary staffing. Jonathon Hart joined the business, as chief executive officer, in January 2011. Following another resultant strategic review, in June 2011, Thorntons announced it would close between 120 and 180, of its shops.

It was announced in June 2015 that chocolate producer Ferrero would buy Thorntons, for £112 million. Thorntons Ltd are 75% owned by Ferholding UK Ltd, which, in turn, is controlled by Giovanni Ferrero (who holds over 50% of voting rights).

With Ferrero investment into the business to try to increase revenue, through the financial year of 2017 to 2018 sales and production increased. Fewer new shops were opened with some existing locations diversified into cafés, selling a range of both eat-in and take-away food and drinks alongside the traditional confectionary lines. In 2020, Thorntons won the Lausanne Index Prize - Bronze Award.

On 15 March 2021, it was announced that all 61 remaining Thorntons retail stores were to close after UK government COVID-19 pandemic restrictions lifted. The pandemic restrictions had meant that all Thorntons retail stores had closed for much of 2020, and the business was now going to restructure in order to move sales both online and to focus retailing on supermarket distribution channels. While announcing that the physical Thorntons stores would close, the company stated that it had seen a 70% increase in sales through the business website compared to the previous year.

== Publicity ==
The current, main advertising slogans are:

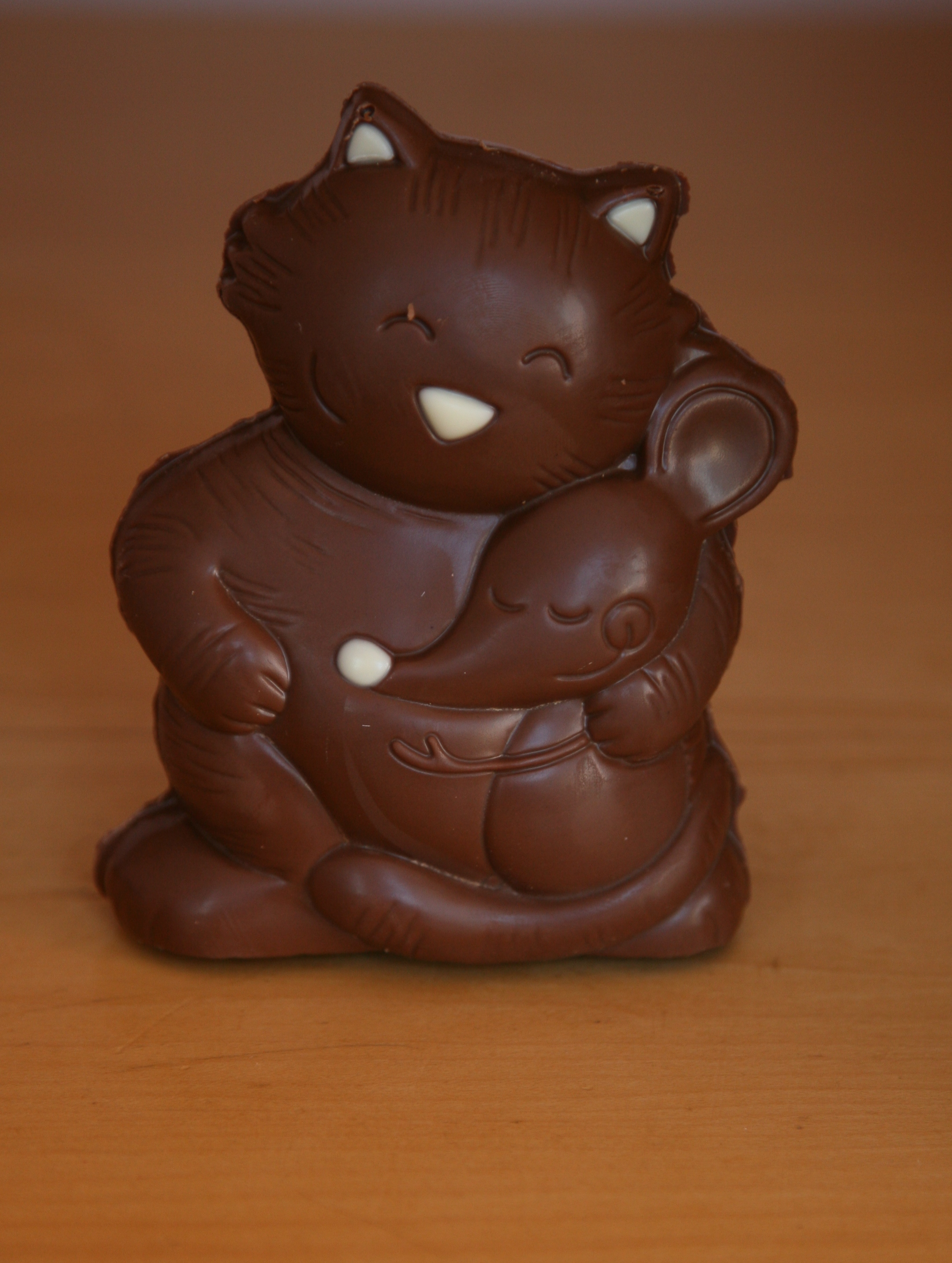
Hollow and solid cats, rabbits and seasonal shapes by the company, often have fine white, or dark chocolate details. (2008)

- Chocolate Heaven Since 1911
- It's The Thorntons That Counts

Thorntons set up a very rare edible billboard, on 3 April 2007, which exceeded four metres length; 14.5 by 9.5 ft (4.4 by 2.9 m) and 390 kg (860 lb) – it was framed outside their shop in Covent Garden, London, and was eaten, within the space of just three hours. The structure included ten chocolate bunnies, seventy two giant chocolate eggs, and 128 chocolate panels, each weighing 2 kg (4.4 lb).

The promotion sought to regain custom lost to competition and a move away from deluxe chocolate gifts, as well as poor sales over the summer of 2006.

== See also ==
- List of bean-to-bar chocolate manufacturers
- Rowntree's
- J. S. Fry & Sons
- Terry's
- Mackintosh's
