= Vegetable oil (disambiguation) =

Vegetable oils are oily (triglyceride-based) liquids or solids derived from plants, including cooking oils like sunflower oil, solid oils like cocoa butter, oils used in paint like linseed oil, and oils for industrial purposes, including as biofuels.

The term may also refer to:

- Essential oils are based on volatile aromatic compounds, and include oils used in flavors, fragrances, and for health purposes, such as lemon oil, or oil of peppermint.
- Macerated oils are oils to which other matter has been added, such as herbs. Typically, the oil used is a food-grade fat-type oil
- Hydrogenated fats and oils are triglyceride-based fats and oils which have been sparged at high temperature and high pressure with hydrogen. The hydrogen bonds with the triglyceride, increasing the molecular weight. Oils are hydrogenated to increase resistance to rancidity (oxidation) or to raise the viscosity and melting point of the fat or oil.

== See also ==
- List of vegetable oils
- List of essential oils
