= Viscount (biscuit) =

British chocolate biscuit

- Type: Biscuit
- Place of origin: United Kingdom
- Created by: Burton's Foods
- Main ingredients: Biscuit, creamy mint or orange flavouring, milk chocolate
- Variations: orange flavour (no longer sold)
- Food energy (per serving): 75 kcal (310 kJ)

Burton's Foods factory, Llantarnam

Viscount (/ˈvaɪkaʊnt/ VY-kownt) biscuits are a classic British biscuit which consist of a circular base of biscuit, topped with a creamy minty or orange flavouring and covered with a layer of milk chocolate flavour coating. They are made by Burton's Foods.

Viscounts have shiny foil wrappers with different colours depending on the biscuit inside—minty biscuits are contained within a green foil wrapper and orange flavoured biscuits (now discontinued) were contained within an orange wrapper. The wrapper features the word Viscount printed on it. A double chocolate version was also available for a time.

Viscount biscuits were redesigned in April 2005, to make the product more appealing to the adult luxury market. The redesign was done by Beswick Design. As part of the redesign, Burton's launched a mini version of the Viscount, which comes in a tub similar to those used for packaging ice cream. However, the coloured wrappers for the two flavours were retained.

For a period during the mid- to late- 1990s, double chocolate Viscount biscuits were available, with a chocolate cream filling, and were sold in a purple foil wrapper.

In November 2010, Burton's launched Cadbury Festives as part of its Cadbury Christmas Biscuits range, these are essentially the same as Viscount Biscuits, but branded under the Cadbury name, with Cadbury Chocolate used in place of the standard chocolate coating.

Burton's customer services department have confirmed (1 October 2014) that they no longer manufacture the orange-flavour Viscount biscuits.
