= Mon Chéri =

Chocolate confectionery

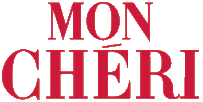

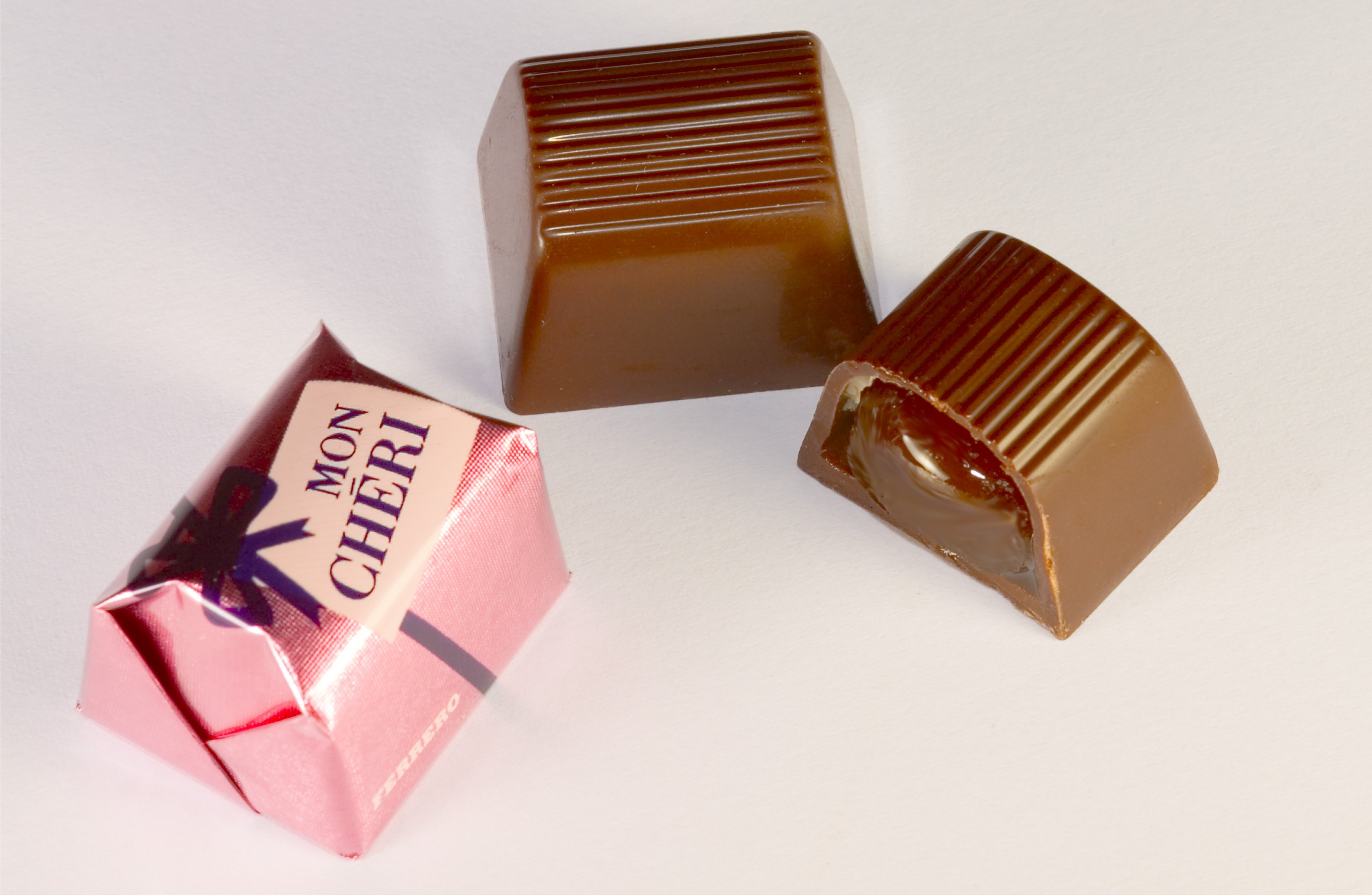
- Product type: Chocolate praline
- Produced by: Ferrero
- Country: Italy
- Introduced: 1956; 70 years ago
- Related brands: Kinder Chocolate; Kinder Surprise
- Markets: International
- Website: ferrero.it/moncheri

Mon Chéri (French for 'My Darling') is an internationally known brand name for a chocolate praline produced by the Italian Ferrero company.

The Mon Chéri is a single-wrapped combination consisting of a "heart" of cherry (18%) floating in a liqueur (13%) and contained in a bittersweet chocolate housing (69%). Each praline contains 46 kilocalories and is packaged in a red/pink wrapper.

Mon Chéri appeared for the first time in Italy in 1956. From 1960 it was produced and marketed on the French and UK markets, and from 1961 on the German market. The name was chosen as a reference to the French way of life and was quickly adopted as the brand name for the international market. Renato Piazza from Feisoglio was working as the head waiter at the Hotel Savona in Alba, the town which houses the Ferrero headquarters. One day, Michele Ferrero (a friend of Francesco Morra, the hotel owner's son) said they were looking for a name for their new creation and Renato, whose step-mother was French, came up with the name Mon Chéri.

== See also ==
- List of confectionery brands
