= Eat Natural =

British food manufacturer

- Company type: Subsidiary
- Industry: Food manufacturing
- Founded: 1997; 28 years ago in Epping, Essex, United Kingdom
- Founders: Praveen Vijh; Preet Grewal
- Headquarters: Halstead, Essex, United Kingdom
- Parent: Ferrero SpA
- Website: www.eatnatural.com

Eat Natural is a cereal bar, toasted muesli and granola maker founded in 1997 in Epping, Essex. In 2005, a journalist said they were "the fastest growing cereal brand in the UK", with between 70,000 and 100,000 bars produced daily, which were distributed to 13 countries. The company now produces nearly 100 million bars a year at its 'Makery' in Halstead, Essex, and exports to 37 countries worldwide.

== History ==
In 1996, fruit and nut importer Praveen Vijh joined forces with best friend and fellow engineering graduate Preet Grewal to create a healthier alternative for a confectionary-centric marketplace. Their first recipe – a date and walnut bar tested in the kitchen of Vijh's Epping flat – is still in production.

The company experienced rapid growth, announcing double-digit growth despite an economic downturn in 2009 and record sales in 2015. In 2017 the company was named Exporter of the Year by The Grocer magazine and in 2018 launched its 'Makery on the Move', an experiential marketing pop-up appearing at Latitude Festival, L'Eroica Britannia, OnBlackheath Festival and Liverpool Food and Drink Festival.

In December 2020, Ferrero announced it was acquiring Eat Natural.

== Products ==
Eat Natural currently makes 22 bars and 8 cereals at its Halstead HQ.

In 2016, Eat Natural launched Bars with Benefits, three new bars that each carried added nutritional claim (extra protein, extra fibre, extra omega-3) based on their ingredients. In 2018, Eat Natural expanded its protein range to include Protein Packed with Salted Caramel and Peanuts, and Protein Packed with Chocolate and Orange. In 2019, the company added two bars – Simply Vegan bar extended its plant-based range, and Fibre Packed addressed demand for a flavour-focussed bar high in dietary fibre.

== Sustainability ==
Eat Natural pledged to achieve plastic neutrality through partnership with Plastic Bank. It reacted to a Brazil nut shortage following a failed harvest in Bolivia by delivering financial assistance to affected communities via local NGO CIPCA.

In 2016, the company launched Pollenation, an initiative supporting the UK honeybee via training and equipping of a new generation of beekeepers. Using £50,000 of company profits, the scheme has built a community of 180 beekeepers. Eighty complete novices were recruited in 2018, each kitted out with full beekeeping kits and Eat Natural hives made from reclaimed wooden pallets previously used to transport fruit and nuts to the company's Makery. In 2019, Eat Natural launched its 'Give Bees A Chance' campaign to extend its support for the British honeybee beyond beekeepers to the wider community.

== Sampling activity ==
In 2019, Eat Natural partnered with fellow Essex brand Ford of Britain, expanding its sampling activities to include more destinations than ever. The company pledged to top its 2018 giveaways which saw around 200,000 bars gifted to charities and community groups. The 2019 programme included student exam kits, university freshers' welcome packs, sports events goodie bags, and more. Summer 2019 saw the return of Eat Natural's 'Makery on the Move', which takes bar-customising activities and ingredient workshops to new locations including CarFest North and South and Bristol International Balloon Fiesta.
