= Kinder (given name) =

Kinder may refer to:

- Kinder Lal (1914–1991), Indian politician
- Kinder Tucker (1875–1939), New Zealand cricketer
