= Kinder (surname) =

Kinder is a surname. Notable people with the surname include:

- Chuck Kinder (1946–2019), American novelist
- Claude W. Kinder (1852–1936), English railway engineer in China
- Derek Kinder (born 1986), American football player
- Donald Kinder (born 1947), American political scientist
- Ellis Kinder (1914–1968), American baseball pitcher
- Gary Kinder (born 1962), American decathlete
- Gary Kinder (author), American writer on sociology and crime
- Hermann Kinder (1944–2021), German writer
- Jan Kinder (1944–2013), Norwegian ice hockey player
- John Kinder (born 1974), American racing driver
- John Kinder (priest) (1819–1903), New Zealand artist and photographer
- Manfred Kinder (born 1938), West German sprinter
- Mary Kinder (1909–1981), Prohibition-era gun moll
- Peter Kinder (born 1954), American politician
- Randy Kinder (born 1975), American football player
- Richard Kinder (born 1944), American businessman, CEO of Kinder Morgan Energy Partners
- Ryan Kinder, American singer
- Steve Kinder, American basketball coach
- Vladimír Kinder (born 1969), Slovak footballer
