= Kinder, Indiana =

- Unincorporated community
- Location within Indiana Location within the United States
- Coordinates: 39°32′38″N 86°11′50″W
- Country: United States
- State: Indiana
- County: Johnson
- Township: White River
- Named for: William Kinder
- Elevation: 791 ft (241 m)
- Time zone: UTC-5 (Eastern)
  - Summer (DST): UTC-4 (Eastern)
- ZIP code: 46106
- FIPS code: 18-39762
- GNIS feature ID: 437313

Kinder is an unincorporated community in White River Township, Johnson County, Indiana.

== History ==
A post office was established at Kinder in 1886, and remained in operation until it was discontinued in 1902. The community may be named for William Kinder, a pioneer.
