= Kinder Bueno =

Chocolate bar made by Ferrero

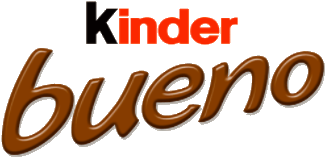

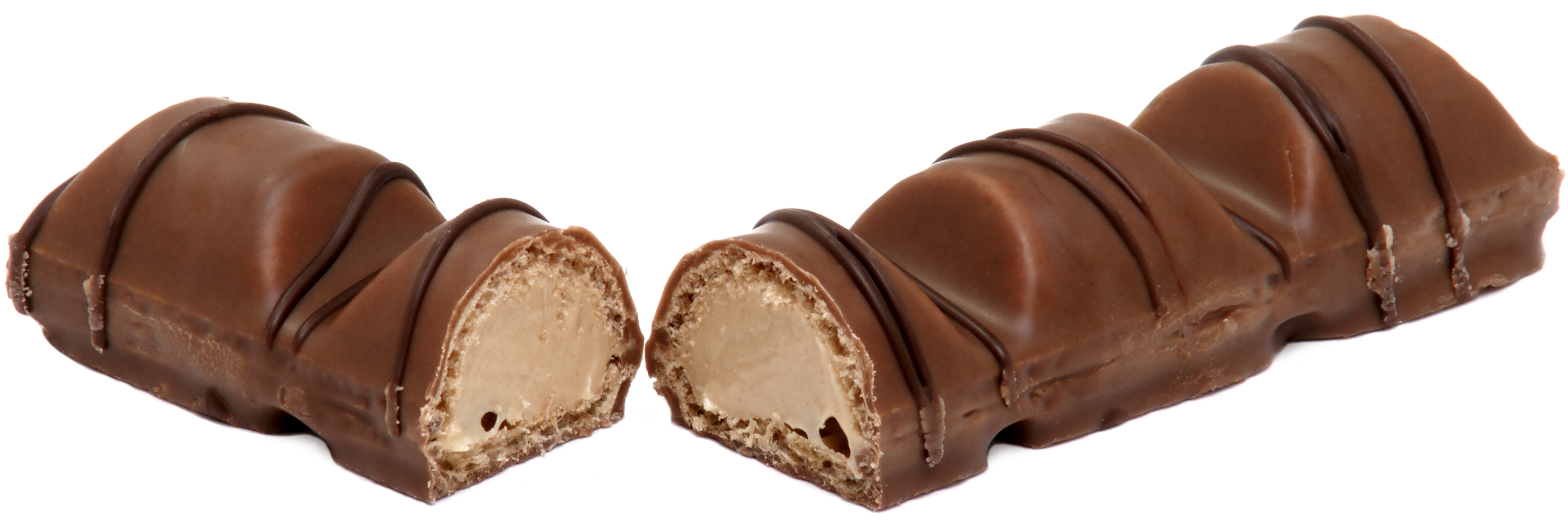
- Product type: Chocolate bar
- Current owner: Ferrero SpA
- Country: Italy
- Introduced: 1990; 36 years ago
- Website: kinder.com/bueno

Nutritional info
Nutritional value per 100 g (3.5 oz)
- Energy: 2,384 kJ (570 kcal)
- Carbohydrates: 49.5 g
- Fat: 37.3 g
- Protein: 8.6 g
Vitamins and minerals
Minerals	Quantity %DV^{†}
Sodium	12% 272 mg
- ^{†}Percentages estimated using US recommendations for adults.

Kinder Bueno (Kinder is German for "children", bueno is Spanish for "good") is a chocolate biscuit and wafer confection made by Italian confectionery maker Ferrero. Part of the Kinder Chocolate brand line, Kinder Bueno is a hazelnut-cream-filled wafer covered in milk chocolate and a dark chocolate drizzle.

Kinder Bueno was launched in 1990 and is available in 60 countries. It is sold in packs of two, three, six, and boxes of ten.

== Production ==
The Kinder Bueno bar is made in the factories of France and Warsaw, Poland. In 2024, Ferrero completed construction of a production facility in Bloomington, Illinois, for the North American market.

== Product range ==
- Kinder Bueno
- Kinder Bueno White – coated with white chocolate and covered in cocoa meringue pieces.
- Kinder Bueno Coconut – with hazelnut cream encased in a coconut milk and white chocolate-covered wafer bar dusted with coconut flakes. It was discontinued in the UK in 2019.
- Kinder Bueno Dark – covered in dark chocolate. It was discontinued in the UK in 2019, but was later relaunched in 2025.
- Kinder Bueno Mini – bite-sized and individually wrapped Kinder Bueno. It is also available in Mini Mix bags, which contains a mix of classic, dark and white Kinder Bueno Mini.
- Kinder Bueno Advent Calendar – advent calendar containing a mix of classic, dark and white Kinder Bueno Mini.
- Kinder Bueno Eggs – mini chocolate easter eggs.
- Kinder Bueno Ice Cream – cone ice cream, available in the classic and white chocolate flavour.

== Mineral oil aromatic hydrocarbon contamination ==
The European Food Safety Authority found the chocolate to be contaminated with high levels of mineral oil aromatic hydrocarbons (MOAH), a likely carcinogen. Hydrocarbon contamination is often caused by grain processing techniques, or is introduced to the food by the product's packaging. Kinder's parent company Ferrero disagreed with the EFSA finding, and maintained all products contain below the maximum levels for human consumption. Other common chocolate products were found to contain similar or higher levels of contamination.
