= Mother's Cookies =

American food brand

- Type: Private (1914–1998)
- Industry: Food
- Founded: 1914; 112 years ago
- Founder: N.M. Wheatley
- Fate: Declared bankruptcy in 2008, becoming a brand
- Owner: Specialty Foods (1998–2000); Parmalat (2000–2005); Catterton Partners (2005–2008); Kellogg's (2008–2019); Ferrero SpA (2019–present)
- Website: motherscookies.com/

Mother's Cookies is a food brand owned by Italian conglomerate Ferrero Group. Mother Cookies began as a bakery based in Oakland, California, that operated from 1914 to 2008. A sister company, Archway Cookies of Battle Creek, Michigan, was founded in 1936. Both Mother's Cookies and Archway declared bankruptcy in 2008. At its height, the company distributed cookies throughout the United States, and was one of the leading cookie makers in the country. The Kellogg Company acquired the Mother's Cookies trademark and recipes in December 2008 and brought the brand back to West Coast grocery store shelves on May 14, 2009.

== History ==
Mother's was founded in 1914 when N.M. Wheatley, a newspaper vendor, purchased the rights to a cookie recipe from a customer. A year later, Wheatley opened a one-person operation on 12th Avenue in Oakland. On May 9, 1914, President Woodrow Wilson had issued a proclamation declaring the first national Mother's Day

Archway was founded in 1936 by the Swansons, a husband-and-wife team who baked soft-batch cookies in their garage. The Swansons expanded their company nationwide in the 1940s, changing its name to Archway to avoid conflict with Swanson, a maker of frozen dinners. In 1962 the founders sold the company to their vice president, George Markham, who bought most of the franchises back over the next several years. Markham in turn sold the company to two employees, who operated it from 1983 to 1998. The company was sold to Specialty Foods in 1998, reportedly for $100 million. The transaction made Specialty Foods the third largest cookie maker in the United States after Keebler and Nabisco.

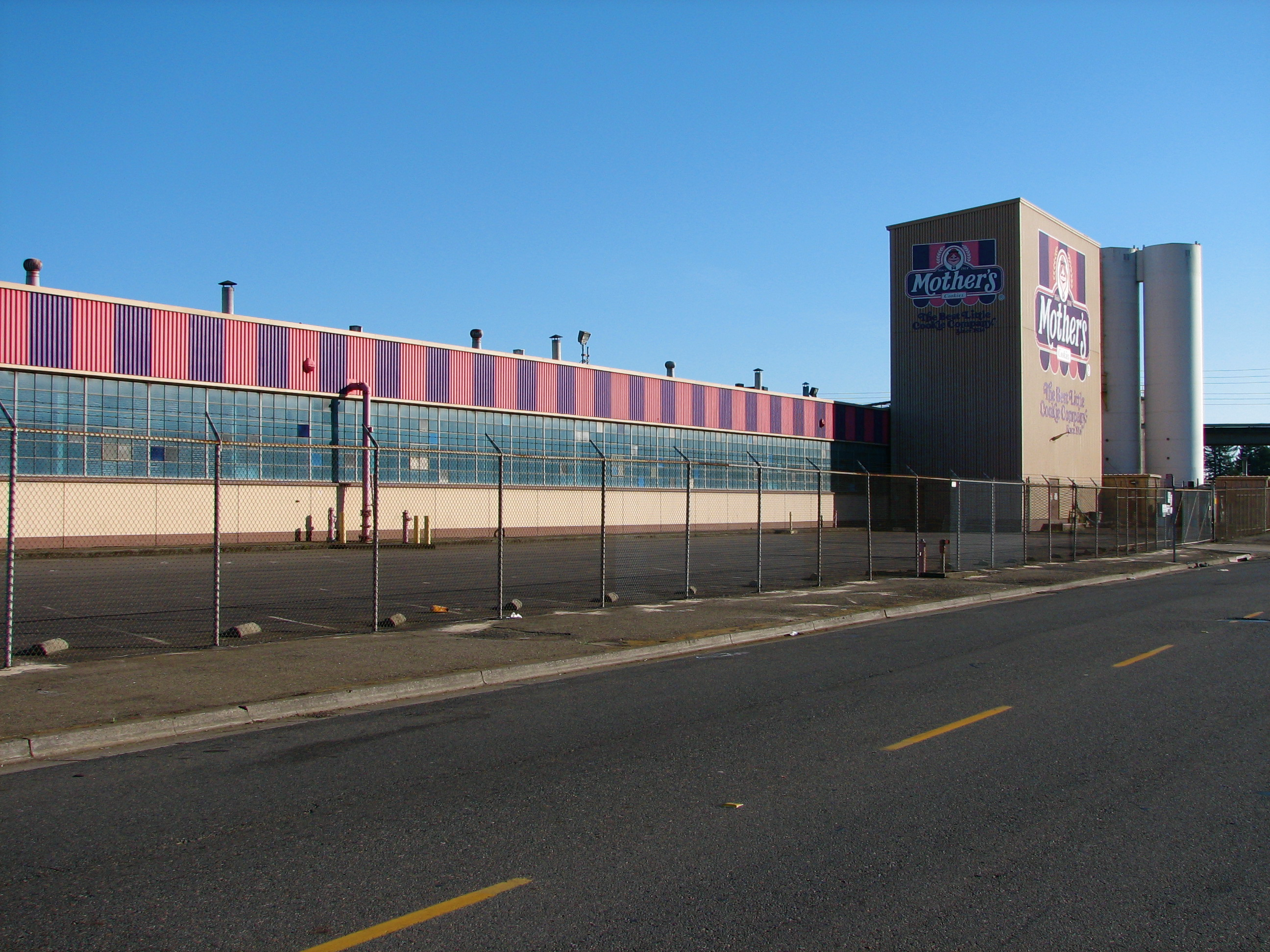
Mother's Cookies factory in Oakland, California, in 2006

The two companies then went through a succession of owners. Mother's was sold to Artal NV, a Belgian company, then bought by Specialty Foods Corp., a conglomerate formed by Robert Bass, who sold Mother's Cake & Cookie Co. and Archway Cookies to Parmalat S.p.A. Specialty Foods sold Mother's and Archway to an Italian firm, Parmalat Finanziaria in 2000 for $250 million. As of 2002 Mother's was baking 17.5 million cookies per day. Cookie sales began to decline after 2000 due to low-fat and low carb diet trends, although sales improved when the company introduced low fat cookies, and accounted for 10% of the United States cookie market as of late 2004. Parmalat filed for bankruptcy amidst a scandal involving illegal sale of corporate bonds. Parmalat in turn sold the companies to Catterton Partners, a private equity firm in Greenwich, Connecticut, in 2005, The new operators closed the Oakland factory in 2006, laid off all 230 workers, and moved baking operations to Ohio and Canada. The company suffered an accounting scandal in 2008 and in October 2008, the company became a victim of the 2008 financial crisis it filed for Chapter 11 bankruptcy and laid off all of its workers.

=== Brand and product returns ===
In December, 2008, Lance Inc. bought the assets of Archway, and soon reopened the former Archway factory in Ashland, Ohio. Also, the same month Kellogg Company was approved to buy the assets of Mother's Cookies with plans to return the products to the shelves in mid-2009. In May 2009, Mother's Cookies returned to store shelves, including Kellogg's launch of a website for the product. After the return of the Mother's Cookies product line, customers noted changes in the recipes, most notably to the Taffy cookie.

In April 2019, Kellogg's announced the sale of Mother's Cookies, among other brands, to Italian confectioner Ferrero SpA, creators of Nutella.

== Products ==
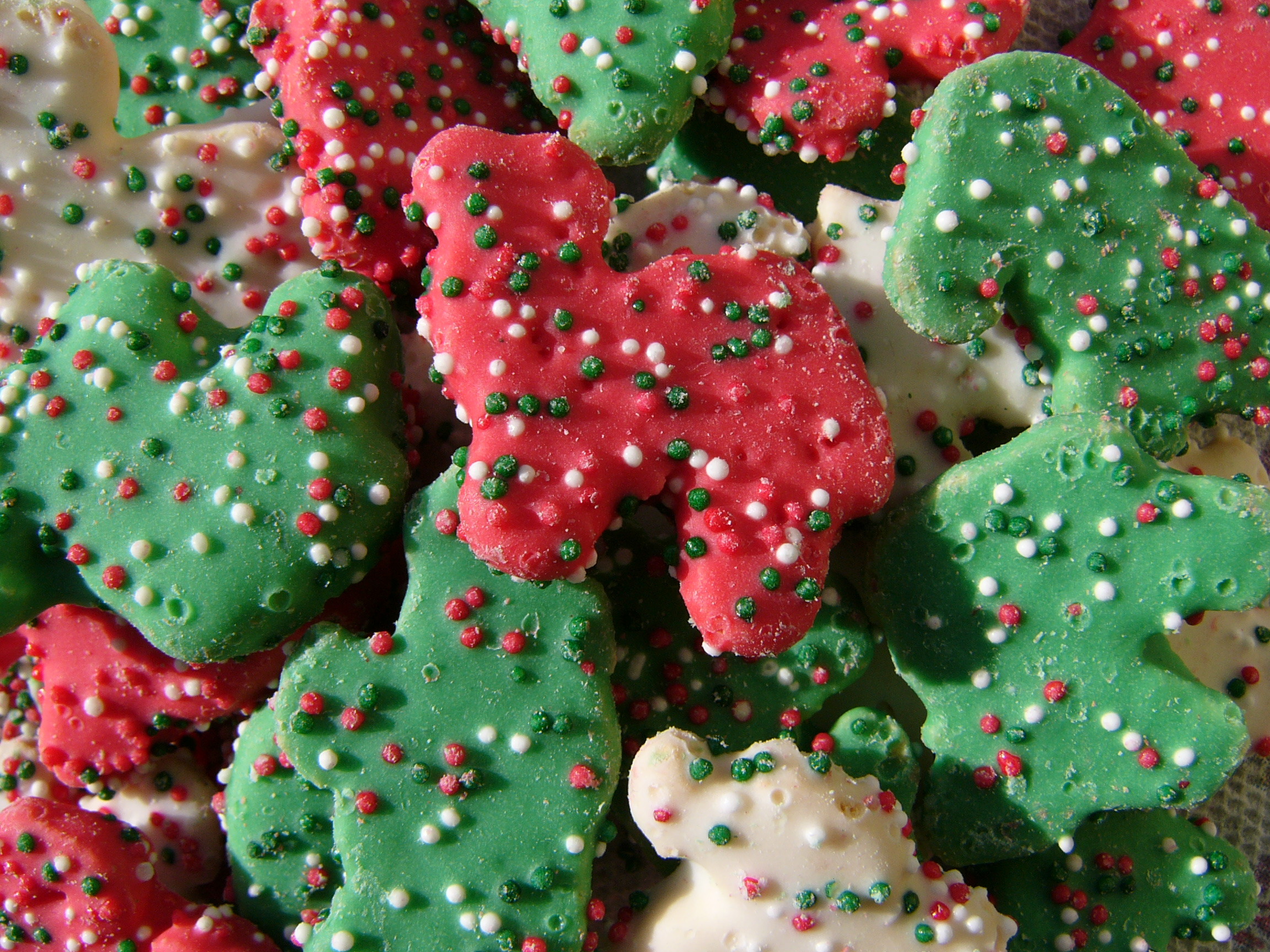
"Holiday" version of Mother's Circus Animal Cookies

Mother's is known for pink and white iced "Circus Animal Cookies", "Taffy Sandwich Cookies" (original recipe), "Peanut Butter Gauchos", and iced oatmeal cookies. Archway's most popular product was Ruth's Oatmeal Cookies, based on a recipe found by one of its franchisees at a county fair, which made up 40% of all sales.

== Promotions ==
The company included collectable baseball cards in their packs of cookies, featuring the Pacific Coast League (1952–53) and several west-coast Major League Baseball teams (1983–2002). Many of those cards were distributed by the teams themselves as promotional stadium giveaways. In the presidential election year of 1992, the company also produced collectable cards featuring the Presidents of the United States.
