= Fox's Biscuits =

British biscuit manufacturer

Fox's Biscuits Limited

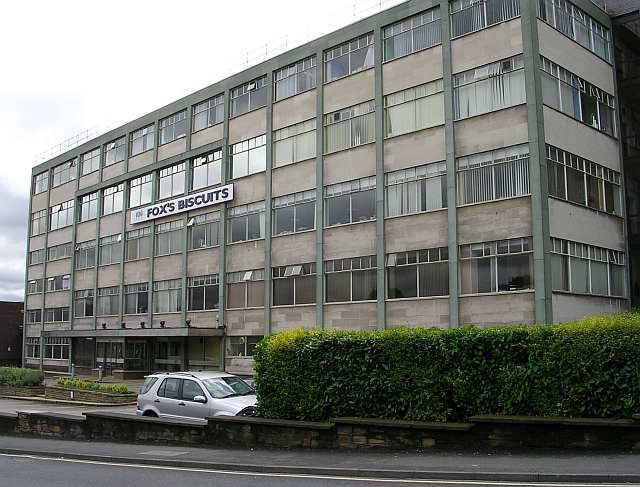
- Fox's head office in Batley, West Yorkshire
- Type: Subsidiary
- Industry: Food manufacturing
- Founded: 1852; 174 years ago
- Founder: Michael Spedding
- Headquarters: Whitaker Street, Batley, West Yorkshire, England
- Number of locations: Batley, West Yorkshire; Wesham, Lancashire
- Products: Biscuits
- Parent: FBC (Ferrero)
- Website: foxs-biscuits.co.uk

Fox's Biscuits is a British biscuit manufacturer, founded by the Fox family in Batley, West Yorkshire, in 1853, and currently a subsidiary of Italian multinational food company Ferrero. The head office and main factory are based in the town, and the company has another site in Wesham in Lancashire. Its biscuits are exported to Europe, North America and Asia.

The business is known for mass-market and chocolate-covered biscuit bars such as Rocky, Classic, Echo, Crunch Creams, and Party Rings. The company also makes own brand biscuit products for a number of supermarkets.

== History ==
The company was founded in 1853 in a terraced house, 17 Whitaker Street, in Batley in West Yorkshire by Michael Spedding, who worked from his small bakehouse making "eatables" to sell at feasts and fairs held throughout the north of England. His daughter Hannah provided the name for the company when she married Fred Ellis Fox in the late 1800s. The house in Whitaker Street still stands. The bakery moved to former wartime allotments site in Batley in 1927.

In 1960, it became a limited company and was named Fox's Biscuits. It was purchased by Northern Foods in 1977, which itself was acquired by 2 Sisters Food Group in 2011. In September 2013, the Yorkshire Society unveiled a White Rose plaque at the site of the first bakery on Whitaker Street: the first time that the society had presented a plaque to commemorate the formation of a business.

The Uttoxeter site was operated as Elkes Biscuits before merging in 2003. Elkes Biscuits, previously Fox's Biscuits, has a factory in Uttoxeter. Elkes was the creator of the malted milk biscuit.

In October 2020, Ferrero bought Fox's Biscuits for £246 million. In 2020, Fox's Biscuits won the Lausanne Index Prize – Bronze Award.

== Advertising ==
On 28 May 2008, Fox's Biscuits launched a TV ad campaign and £5 million marketing campaign centred on "Vinnie", a "danda", cross between a dog and a panda, meant to be Fox's "number one fan" who had travelled across the Atlantic to make sure everybody knew who makes his favourite biscuits (which he mispronounces with a "w" instead of a "u"). The idea of Vinnie was developed with the animation team behind Disney's The Chronicles of Narnia.

== Products ==
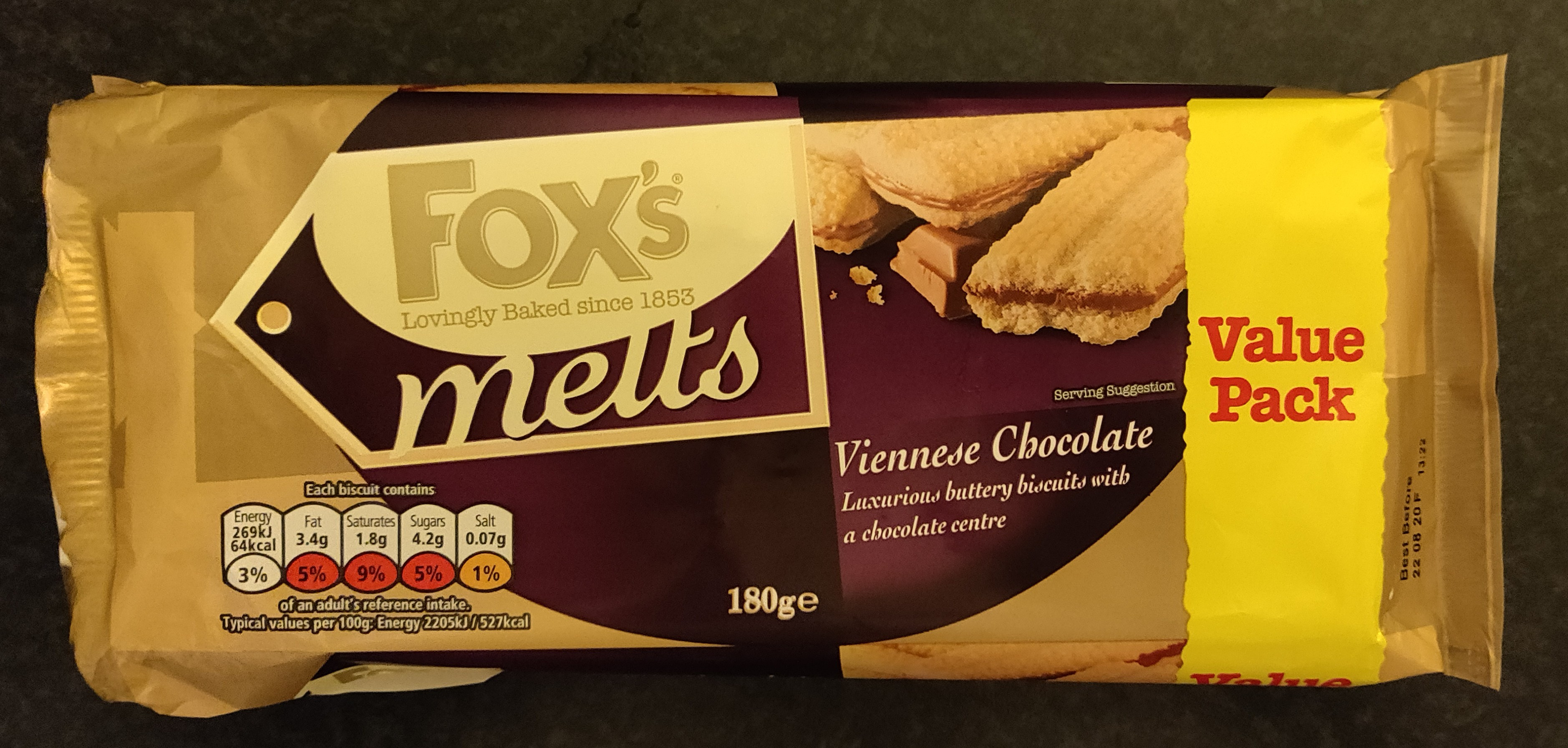
A pack of Fox's Melts Viennese Chocolate biscuits

The company website contains nutritional and allergy information as well as descriptions of each product. The biscuits currently manufactured by Fox's are:

- Rocky (Chocolate, Caramel, Orange[Limited Edition], Crispy Crunch)
- Rocky Chockas (Double Choc, Toffee, Honeycomb)
- Rocky Rocks (Chocolate or Crispy Crunch)
- Echo (Mint, Orange, Chocolate)
- Classic
- Cookie Bars
- Triple
- Viennese (Milk Chocolate, Dark Chocolate)
- Millionaire's Shortcake
- Shortcake Rounds
- Extremely Chocolatey Cookie
- Chunk Cookie (Dark Chocolate, Milk Chocolate, White Chocolate)
- Crunch Creams (Ginger, Golden, Chocolate Fudge, Classic, Double Choc)
- Creams (Rich Tea, Jam Ring, Malted Milk, Nice, Classic)
- Crinkles (Butter, Ginger, Coconut, Milk Chocolate)
- Dunkers (Oaty, Shortcake)
- Sports
- Party Rings
- Minis (Buttery and Oaty)
- Bourbon biscuit
- Creations
- Speciality
- Speciality Brandy Snaps
- Favourites
- Luxury Chocolate Carton
- Wholemeal Cracker (Original, Tomato & Red Pepper, Cheese & Onion and Sunflower Seed & Honey)

== See also ==
- Burton's Biscuit Company
- Huntley & Palmers
- Jacob Fruitfield Food Group
- Tunnock's
- United Biscuits
