= Murray Sugar Free Cookies =

- Founded: 1941
- Founder: John L. Murray
- Website: www.murraysugarfree.com

Murray Sugar Free Cookies, also known as the Murray Biscuit Company, is a commercial bakery in Augusta, Georgia, United States, that produces calorie-reduced biscuits. The company is part of the Ferrero Group, an Italian company best known for its Nutella hazelnut spread, and operates as a division of Ferrero U.S.A., Inc. It was founded by John L. Murray, a salesperson who accepted a cookie machine as payment for a $500 debt.

In 1965, the company was sold to Beatrice Foods.

On April 1, 2019, it was announced that Kellogg's was selling Murray's and its other cookie bakeries to Ferrero SpA for $1.4 billion. On July 29, 2019, that sale was completed.
