= Kinder, West Virginia =

- Unincorporated community
- Location within West Virginia Location within the United States
- Coordinates: 38°10′5″N 82°8′40″W
- Country: United States
- State: West Virginia
- County: Lincoln
- Elevation: 643 ft (196 m)
- Time zone: UTC-5 (Eastern (EST))
  - Summer (DST): UTC-4 (EDT)
- GNIS feature ID: 1741641

Kinder was an unincorporated community in Lincoln County, West Virginia, United States. Its post office is closed.
