= Ferrero SpA =

Italian multinational food corporation

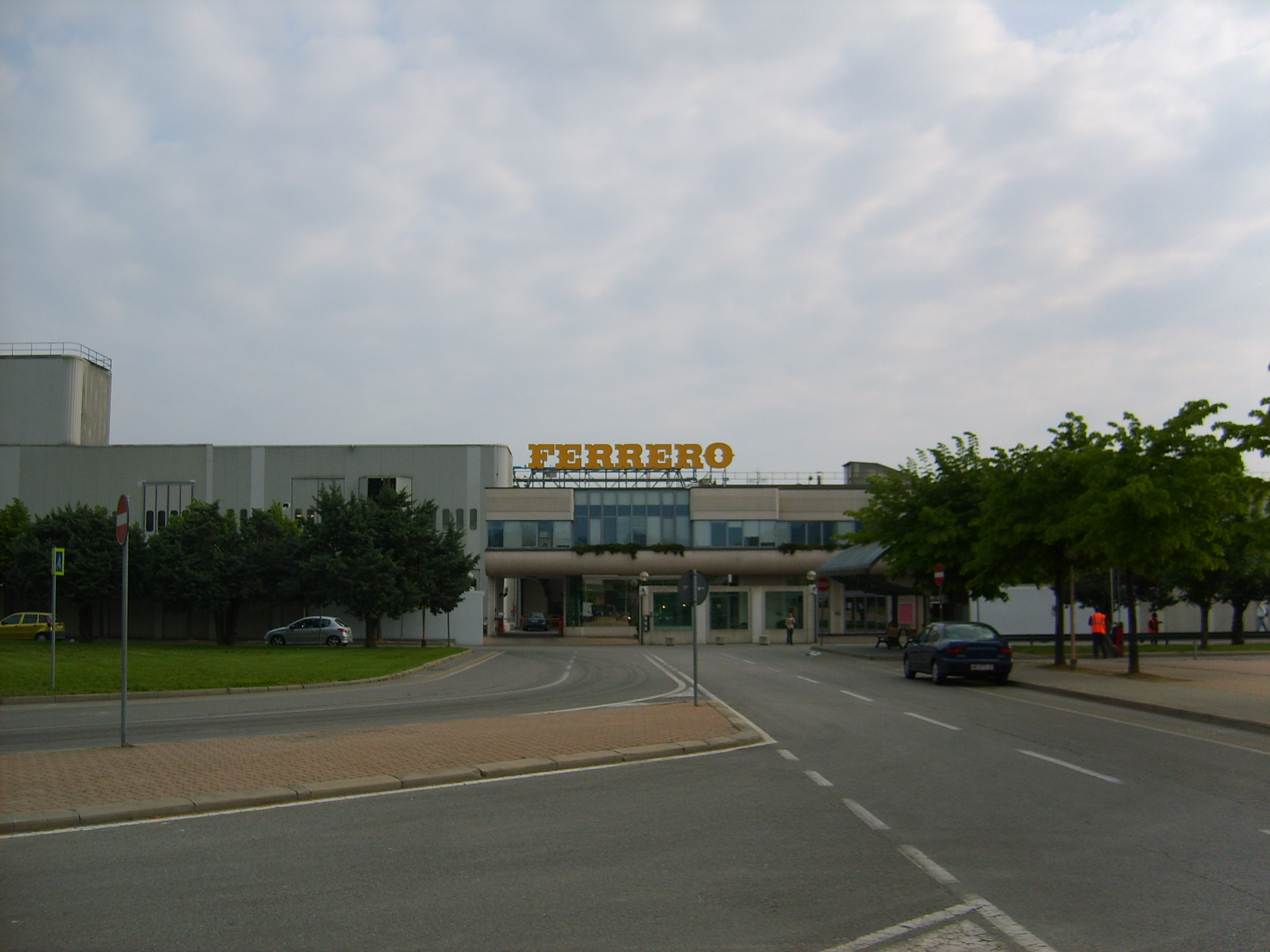
- Headquarters in Alba
- Type: Società per azioni
- Industry: Food
- Founded: 14 May 1946; 80 years ago
- Founder: Pietro Ferrero
- Headquarters: Alba, Piedmont, Italy
- Area served: Worldwide
- Key people: Giovanni Ferrero (president of Ferrero International S.A.); Alessandro Nervegna (CEO of Ferrero Core); Lapo Civiletti (president of Ferrero Ice Cream and WK Kellogg Co.)
- Products: chocolate confectionery; sugar confectionery; mints; biscuits; baked snacks; breakfast cereals; ice cream; frozen desserts; beverages; spreads; snack and nutrition bars
- Brands: List: Delacre; Eat Natural; Famous Amos; Fannie May; Ferrara Candy Company; Ferrero-Küsschen; Ferrero Rocher; Hanuta; Keebler; Kinder Bueno; Kinder Chocolate; Kinder Joy; Kinder Surprise; Mon Chéri; Mother's Cookies; Nutella; Pocket Coffee; Raffaello; Royal Dansk; Thorntons; Tic Tac; WK Kellogg Co; All Ferrero International brands
- Revenue: ▲€ 19 billion (fiscal year 2025)
- Operating income: €1,034 million (FY 2018–2019)
- Owner: Ferrero family
- Number of employees: 48,697 (August 2025)
- Subsidiaries: Burton's Biscuit Company; Carambar & Co; Eat Natural; Fannie May; Ferrara Candy Company; Fox's Biscuits; Keebler Company; Michel et Augustin; Mother's Cookies; Royal Dansk; Thorntons; Wells Enterprises; WK Kellogg Co
- Website: ferrero.com

Ferrero SpA (/fəˈrɛəroʊ/ fə-RAIR-oh, Italian: [ferˈrɛːro]), more commonly known as Ferrero Group or simply Ferrero, is an Italian multinational company with headquarters in Alba, Piedmont. Ferrero is a manufacturer of branded chocolate and confectionery products, and is reportedly the second largest chocolate producer and confectionery company in the world. Ferrero SpA is a private company owned by the Ferrero family and it has been described as "one of the world's most secretive firms".

It was founded in 1946 in Alba by Pietro Ferrero, a confectioner and small-time pastry maker who laid the groundwork for the introduction of Nutella. The company had a period of tremendous growth and success under Pietro's son Michele Ferrero, who in turn handed over the daily operations to his sons, Pietro Jr. and Giovanni Ferrero (the founder's grandsons). In 2015, following Pietro Jr.'s sudden death in 2011, Giovanni Ferrero became the company's sole leader as executive chairman and majority owner.

As of 2025, the Ferrero Group reportedly includes 36 manufacturing plants, and approximately 48,697 employees worldwide. Also as of 2025, it reportedly produces 1.5 million tons of food annually.

== History ==
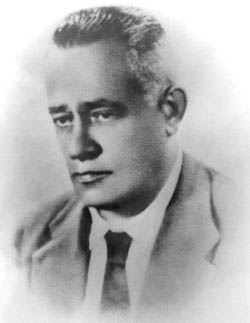
Pietro Ferrero, founder

In 1946, Pietro Ferrero, an Italian pastry chef, invented a cream of hazelnuts and cocoa, a secret recipe that used nuts to cut down on the more expensive cocoa in a spread derived from gianduja (a typical Turin product), calling it Pasta Gianduja. The initial product came in solid loaves wrapped in aluminium foil, which had to be sliced with a knife, and was succeeded by a spreadable version called Supercrema.

With assistance from his brother Giovanni Ferrero Sr., Pietro Ferrero created his new company to produce and market the initial product. Pietro was succeeded by his son Michele Ferrero as chief executive. Michele and his wife Maria Franca relaunched his father's recipe as Nutella, which was first sold in 1964. They opened production sites and offices abroad, and Nutella eventually became the world's leading chocolate-nut spread brand. Ferrero is the world's largest consumer of hazelnuts, buying up 25% of global production in 2014.

Michele Ferrero later passed the reins of daily management to his own sons, Pietro Jr. and Giovanni Ferrero, grandsons to the founder. However, in 2011, Pietro Jr. died at the age of 47 after suffering a heart attack while cycling in South Africa. In 2015, Giovanni Ferrero, grandson of Pietro and son of Michele Ferrero, took the reins as executive chairman and majority owner. In September 2017, Lapo Civiletti, a longtime executive at the company, became the first non-family CEO in the history of the company. Giovanni Ferrero instead became the executive chairman, focusing on long-term strategy. As of July 9, 2024, Giovanni Ferrero was named the wealthiest person in Italy with a net worth of $43.3 billion.

The company places great emphasis on secrecy, reportedly to guard against industrial espionage. It has never held a press conference and does not allow media visits to its plants. Ferrero's products are made with machines designed by an in-house engineering department.

As of April 2024, Fortune Magazine reported that Ferrero was the world's second largest chocolate company, after American company Mars Inc.. In its 2025 financial statements released February 2026, the company reported 48,697 employees worldwide, and 36 manufacturing plants. The company also reported that it produced 1.5 million tons of food in 2025.

In March 2026, the company announced a corporate restructuring to support its sweet packaged foods businesses, to go into effect on September 1, 2026. Ferrero executive chairman Giovanni Ferrero was announced as president of Ferrero International S.A., and two new roles were created reporting to him: Alessandro Nervegna was named CEO of Ferrero Core, a newly established business unit including the company's Confectionery; Biscuits and Bakery; and Better-For-You businesses, and Ferrero CEO Lapo Civiletti was named president of Ferrero Ice Cream and WK Kellogg Co.

In April 2026, the European Commission conducted unannounced antitrust inspections at Ferrero's premises in order to investigate possible violations of Article 101 and Article 102 TFEU. The investigation concerns potentially illegal market segmentation by Ferrero through restrictions on cross-border trade and multi-country purchases within the European single market. According to the Commission, the inspections took place in two EU member states.

Also in 2026, the company launched Nutella Peanut, its first new Nutella flavor since 1964.

=== 2022 salmonella outbreak ===
On 6 April 2022, the European Food Safety Authority (EFSA) and the European Centre for Disease Prevention and Control (ECDC) began investigating a "rapidly evolving" outbreak of salmonella linked to Kinder Surprise chocolate eggs. The outbreak affected European countries, with products being recalled "as a precautionary step". Products were also recalled in Canada and the US.

On 8 April, Belgian authorities ordered the closure of a Kinder chocolate factory in Arlon suspected to be behind the outbreak. On 12 April, the EFSA and the ECDC published a rapid outbreak assessment on a multi-country outbreak of monophasic salmonella typhimurium linked to chocolate products made at the Belgian factory. The report found that in December 2021, salmonella was detected in a buttermilk tank at the Belgian establishment during the manufacturer's own checks. The company implemented some hygiene measures and increased sampling and testing of the products and the processing environment. After negative salmonella testing, it then distributed the chocolate products across Europe and globally.

As of 8 April 2022, 150 cases had been reported in ten European countries including Belgium, France, Germany, Ireland, Luxembourg, the Netherlands, Norway, Spain, Sweden, and the United Kingdom.

== Acquisitions ==
In 2014, Ferrero acquired Oltan Group, the largest hazelnut supplier in the world. In June 2015, Ferrero acquired the British chocolate retailer Thorntons for £112 million. In 2016, Ferrero SpA acquired Belgian biscuit brands Delacre and DeliChoc from United Biscuits. In March 2017, Ferrero SpA bought the US chocolate maker Fannie May from 1-800-Flowers.com. The deal closed on 30 May 2017, and Ferrero paid $115 million. Ferrero indicated that they hope to expand Fannie May, with locations across the US, not just in Chicago. In October, Ferrero announced that they would acquire the Ferrara Candy Company and the acquisition was completed that December.

In January 2018, it was reported that Ferrero was purchasing Nestlé's American confectionery business for $2.8 billion. The deal included the Baby Ruth, Crunch Bar and Butterfinger brands, but did not affect Nestlé's confectionery business elsewhere, and did not include Kit Kat, Nesquik or the Toll House baking line. The acquisition was completed in March 2018. Consumer market strategist Lawrence Allen characterized the merger as Nestlé moving to being a health company, and as Ferrero acquiring a manufacturing base in the US and expanding their US product range.

In July 2019, Ferrero further expanded its US operations by purchasing a collection of business owned by Kellogg's. Included in the deal were Kellogg's cookie, fruit and fruit-flavoured snack, ice cream cone and pie crust businesses, the renowned brands Famous Amos, Murray's, Keebler, Mother's, and Little Brownie Bakers (one of the producers of the cookies for the Girl Scouts of the USA), as well as a leased manufacturing facility in Baltimore, six food manufacturing facilities across the country, and two plants in Chicago. Ferrero paid Kellogg's $1.3 billion. Also in July, a subsidiary of Ferrero purchased Campbell's's stake in the Danish bakery Kelsen Group for $300 million..

In October 2020, it was announced that Ferrero would buy UK company Fox's Biscuits for £250 million. In December 2020, Ferrero announced it was acquiring healthy snack company Eat Natural. In June 2021, Ferrero bought British firm Burton's Biscuit Company, which at the time of purchase employed 2,000 people at six plants in the UK. It is believed the transaction was made for about £360 million.

In April 2022, it was announced Ferrero had acquired the vitamin and protein bar producer Fulfil Nutrition headquartered in Dublin. As part of a pre-existing joint venture with Fulfil, US candy company Hershey was to maintain distribution rights in North America, with Ferrero taking over Fulfil's distribution outside North America. In December, the company announced its acquisition of Wells Enterprises, an American ice cream manufacturer based in LeMars, Iowa. Wells Enterprises is best known for Blue Bunny, Blue Ribbon, Bomb Pop, and Halo Top brands.

In February 2023, it was announced Ferrero would acquire the frozen bakery company Fresystem SPA based in Naples, Italy. In July 2023, Ferrero International's Ferrara Candy affiliate acquired Brazilian sweets and snacks company Dori Alimentos, and in October 2023, Ferrara Candy also acquired Jelly Belly candy.

In January 2025, Ferrero acquired protein snack company Power Crunch from Bio-Nutritional Research, to add to the company's "better-for-you" food category. In July 2025, it was announced that Ferrero would be buying cereal giant WK Kellogg Co in an approximately $3 billion deal; WK Kellogg Co itself was the result of a spinoff of the North American cereal business of the original Kellogg's which retained its international cereals, meals, and snacks business as Kellanova (which was bought by Mars Inc. for just under $36 billion that same year). In October 2025, Ferrero SpA bought Carambar & Co from Eurazeo for €240 million.

In August 2026, Ferrero announced that it was acquiring breakfast brand Purely Elizabeth. While neither company has confirmed the purchase price, some sources estimate the deal at $850 million.

== Products ==
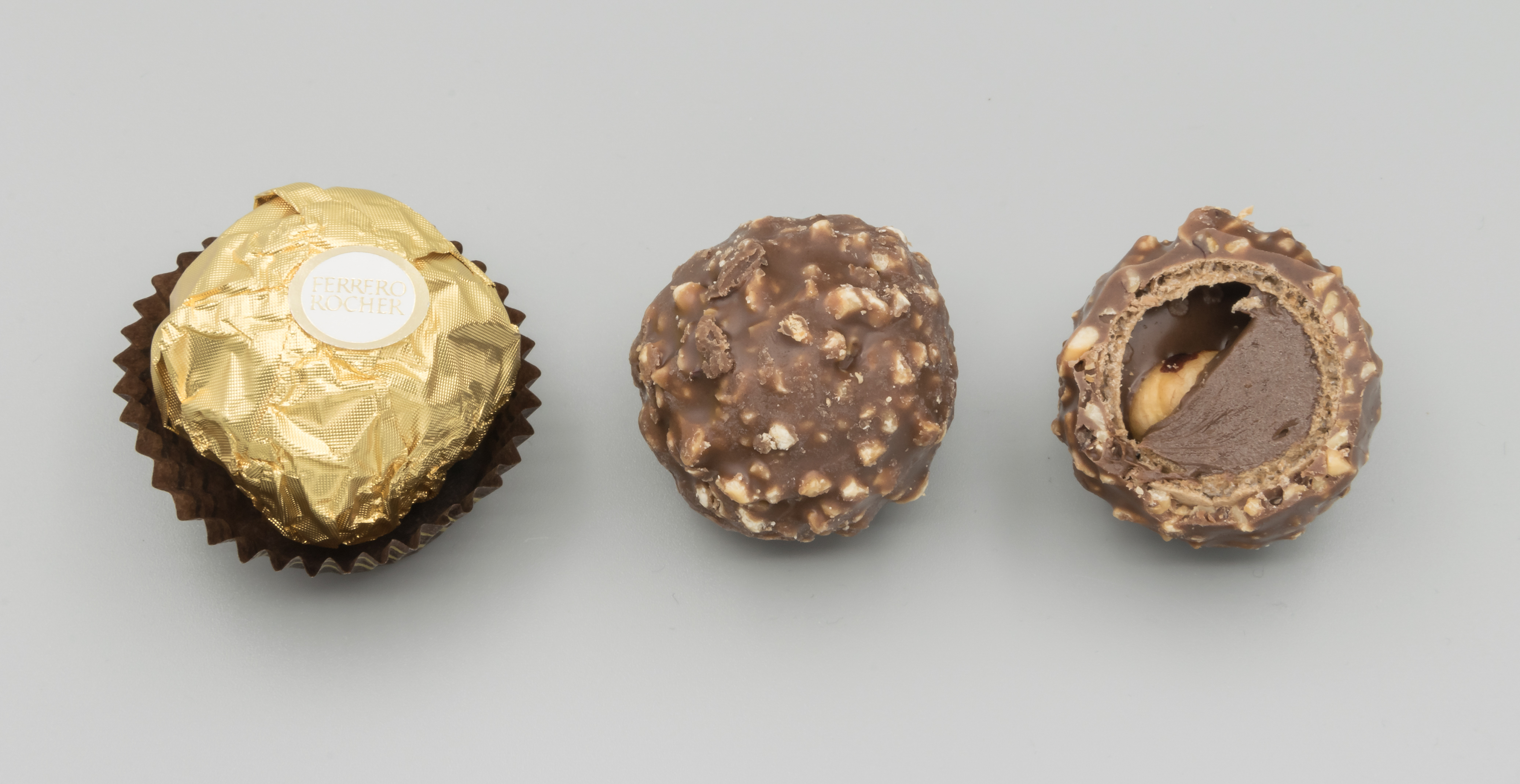
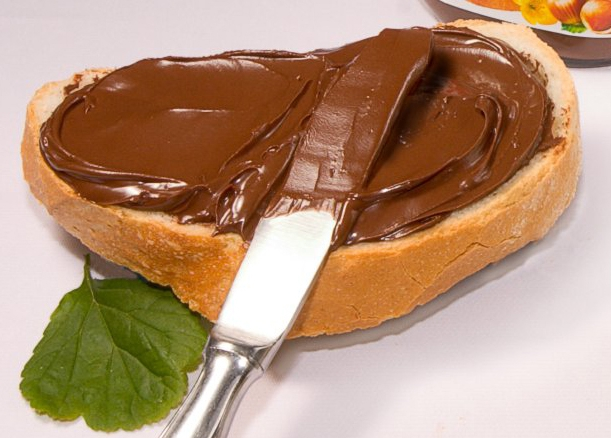
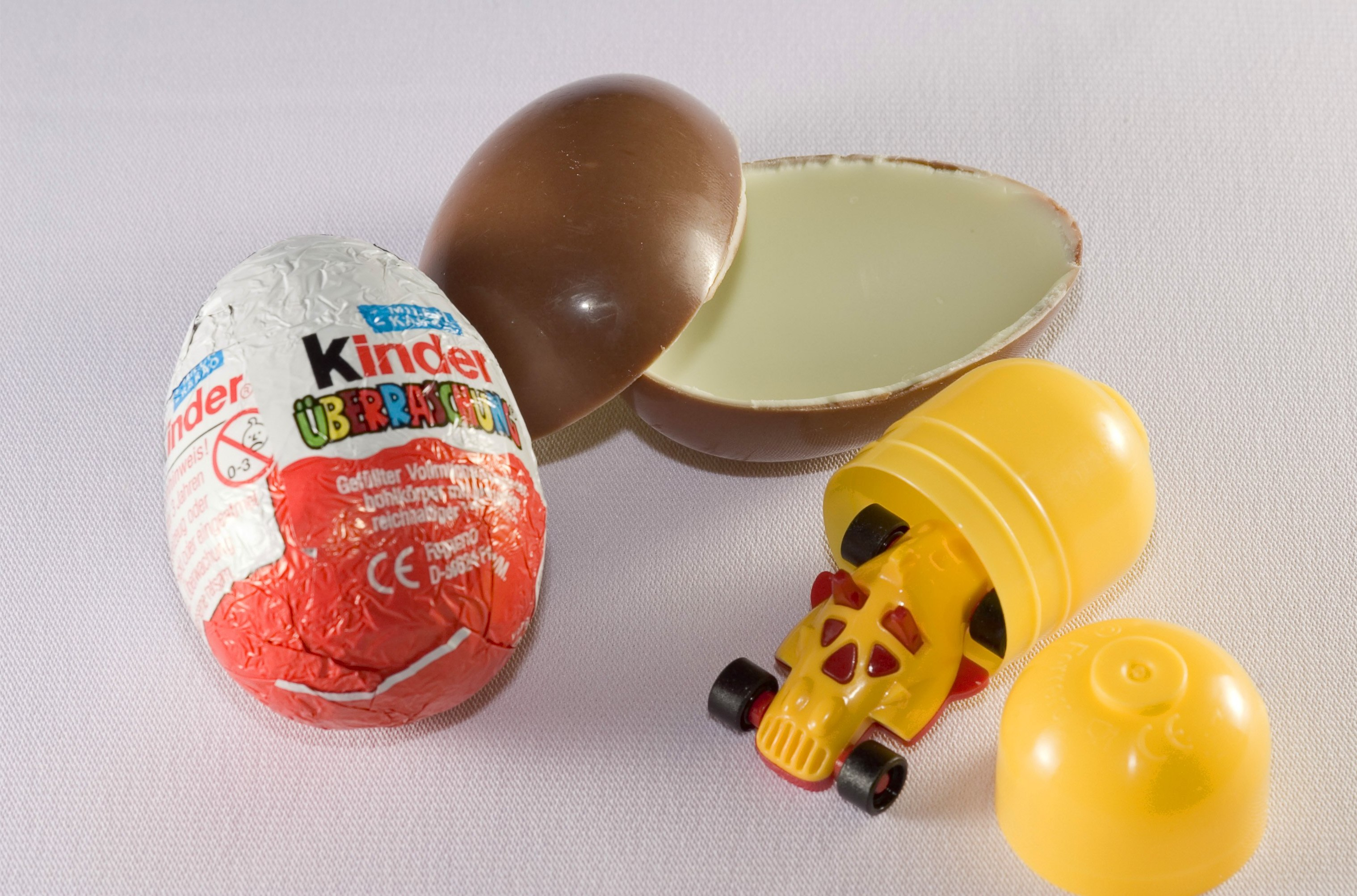
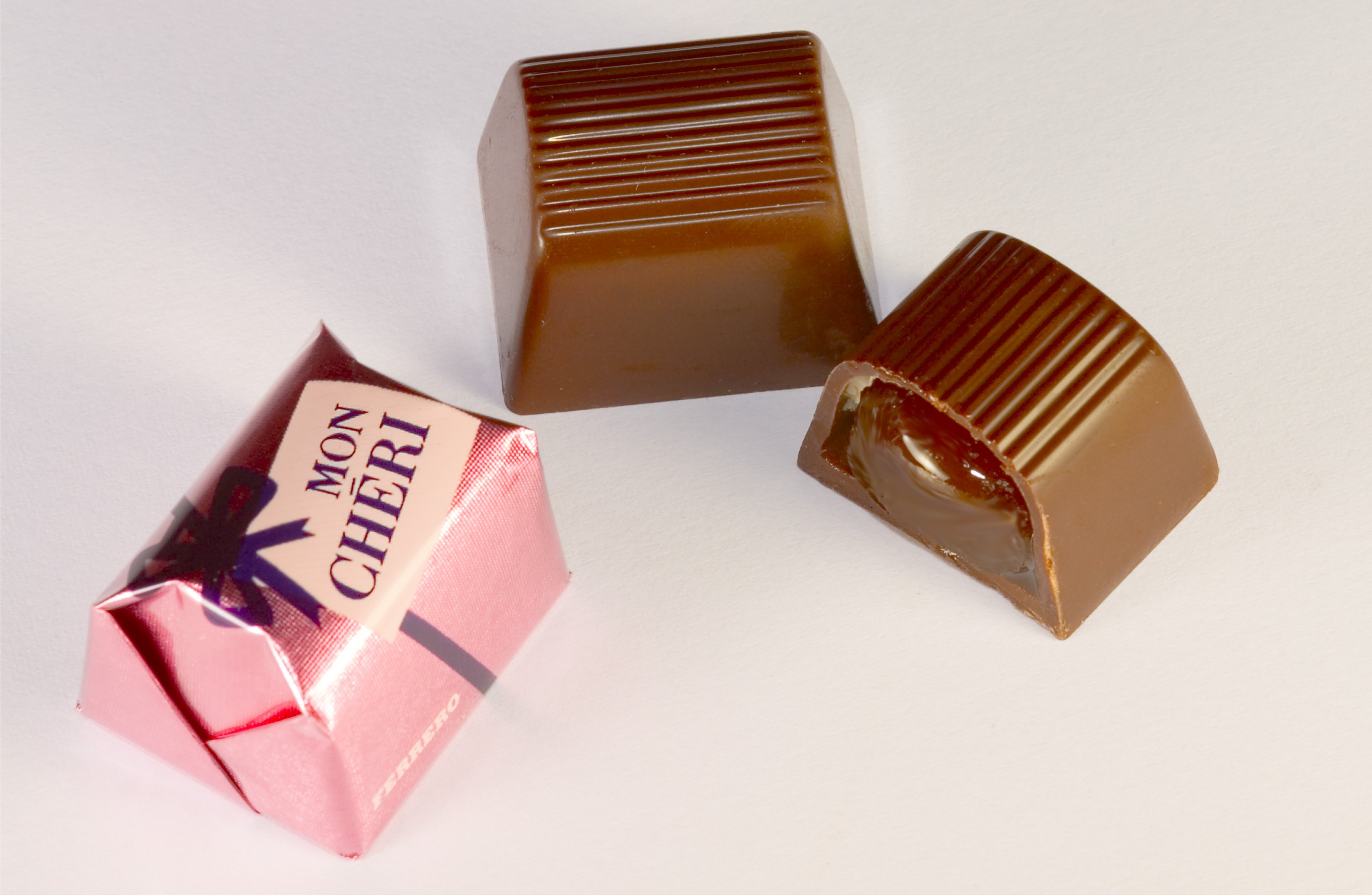
Some products by Ferrero; clockwise from top: Ferrero Rocher bonbon, Nutella spread, Mon Chéri bonbon, Kinder Surprise egg

Ferrero produces several lines of confectionery goods under various brand names, as well as the chocolate-hazelnut spread Nutella (since 1964). Ferrero uses one-quarter of the world's annual hazelnut supply. The Nutella product line includes a Nutella Peanut variety, introduced in 2026.

It also produces the line of Ferrero branded chocolate products, including Pocket Coffee, Mon Chéri, Confetteria Raffaello, Ferrero Küsschen and the Ferrero Prestige line, which comprises three different brands of pralines: Ferrero Rocher, Ferrero Rondnoir, and Garden Coco.

Ferrero's Kinder brand line of chocolate products includes Kinder Surprise, Kinder Joy, Kinder Chocolate, Kinder Happy Hippo, Kinder Maxi, Kinder Duplo, Kinder Country, Kinder Délice, and Kinder Bueno. The company also produces Tic Tac mints, available in a variety of flavours, along with sugar free versions. Other Ferrero products include Raffaello, Giotto, Fiesta Ferrero, Hanuta chocolate hazelnut-filled wafers, and Gran Soleil frozen desserts, which won the company an innovation award in March 2011. Ferrero has been producing Thorntons products since acquiring the company in 2015.

== Philanthropy ==
In 1983, the company established the Ferrero Foundation in Alba, Piedmont, at the wish of Michele Ferrero. The foundation promotes activities in the areas of art, science, history and literature by organizing conventions, conferences, seminars and exhibitions. It also offers health and social assistance to ex-employees who have been with the group for at least 25 years.

== See also ==
- List of Ferrero International brands
- List of confectionery brands
