= Raffaello (confection) =

Coconut sweet from Ferrero

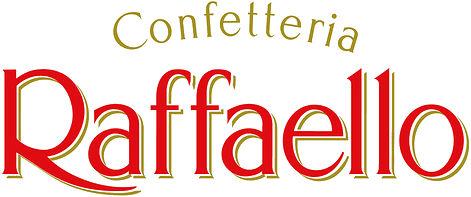

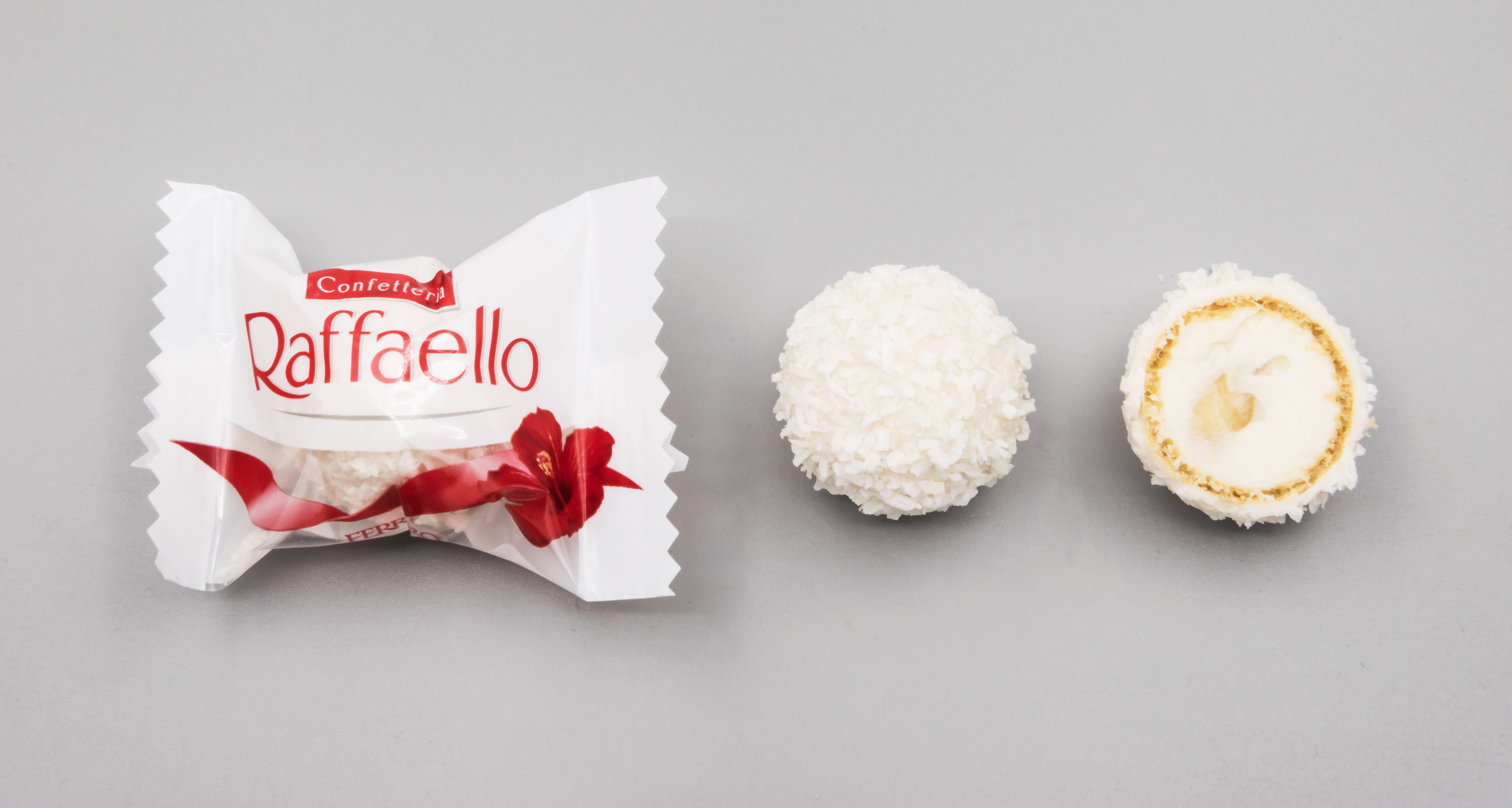
- Product type: Coconut truffle
- Current owner: Ferrero SpA
- Country: Italy
- Introduced: 1990; 36 years ago
- Website: ferrero.it/raffaello

Raffaello is a spherical coconut–almond truffle that Italian manufacturer Ferrero brought to the market in 1990. It consists of a spherical wafer that is filled with a white milk cream and white blanched almonds. It is then surrounded by a white chocolate and coconut layer. It does contain lactose, making Raffaello incompatible for consumers with lactose intolerance.

Ferrero factories which manufacture Raffaello include Vladimir, Russia; Brantford, Canada; and Arlon, Belgium. Russia is Ferrero's largest market for Raffaello.

== History ==
In 2008, Belgian company Soremartec (part of the Ferrero Group) began legal action against Landrin, a Ukrainian company that began producing a sweet in 2007 similar to Raffaello, called Waferatto. Soremartec filed a claim on the grounds that Landrin had violated Soremartec's trademark protecting the appearance of the Raffaello sweets. After a lengthy court battle, the High Commercial Court of Ukraine ruled in favor of Landrin, cancelling the validity of Soremartec's trademark.

In 2017, a court in Frankfurt in Germany ruled that Ferrero would have to list the number of Raffaello sweets in each packet sold, rather than simply providing the weight.

== See also ==
- List of confectionery brands
