= Kinder Surprise =

Chocolate egg candy

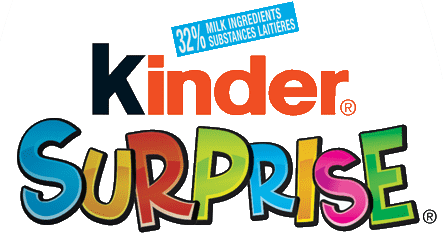

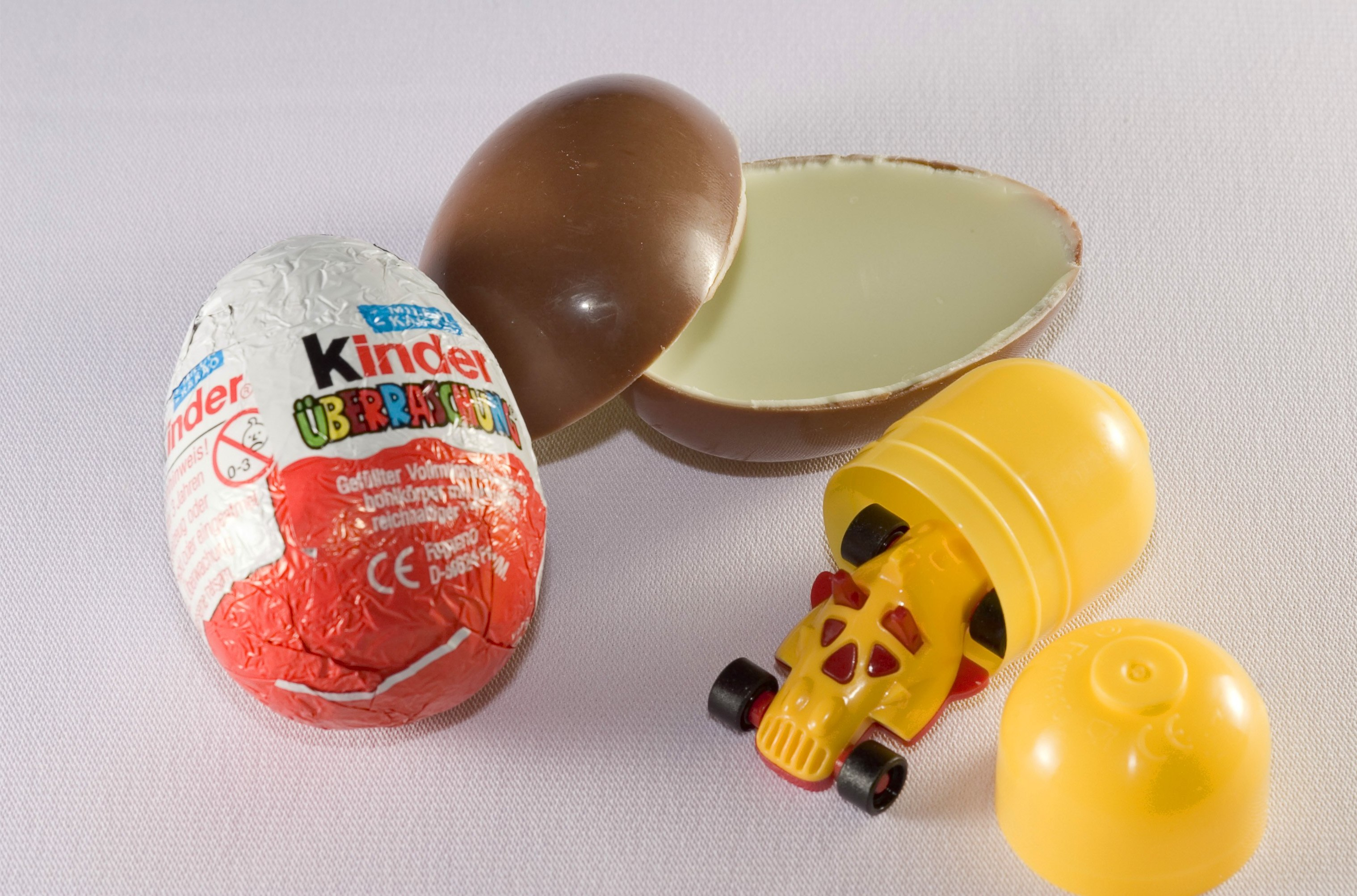
- Product type: Chocolate egg
- Current owner: Ferrero SpA
- Introduced: 17 February 1974; 52 years ago
- Website: kinder.com/sorpresa

Kinder Surprise (Italian: Kinder Sorpresa or Ovetto Kinder), (Note: Kinder means children in German and ovetto means small egg in Italian.) also known as Kinder Egg or Kinder Surprise Egg, is a milk chocolate consisting of a chocolate egg surrounding a yellow plastic capsule with a small toy inside. Manufactured by the Italian company Ferrero since 1974, it was co-created by Michele Ferrero and William Salice, and is one of several confectioneries sold under the Kinder brand.

Kinder Surprise was originally created with children in mind, replicating an Italian Easter family tradition in which adults give children large chocolate eggs with toys inside, but Kinder Surprise toys have become collectible for adults as well. As of 2016, 30 billion Kinder Surprise eggs have been sold worldwide since its launch in 1974.

== Description ==
Kinder Surprise is a milk chocolate egg lined with a layer of white chocolate. Inside each egg is a plastic capsule, which would be twisted open along its circumference, and that contains a small surprise toy, which sometimes requires assembly. The capsule case is colored yellow and sometimes orange, to resemble an egg's yolk. The chocolates have foil packaging with warning labels advising parents to avoid giving the eggs to children under three years old and encouraging supervision during consumption.

Kinder Surprise was originally created with children in mind, replicating an Italian Easter family tradition in which adults give children a large chocolate egg with a toy inside, but Kinder Surprise toys have become collectible for adults as well. Collectors often try to acquire all toys within a themed set. Some even share their egg openings on social media, or create their own toys and re-wrap them in Kinder Surprise packaging. More than 100 new toys are distributed each year. Around 12,000 different toys had been included within Kinder Surprise as of 2016.

According to CNN Business, Kinder Surprise is most popular in Germany, Russia and the United Kingdom. Michele Ferrero and William Salice have been credited as co-creators of the egg.

== History ==
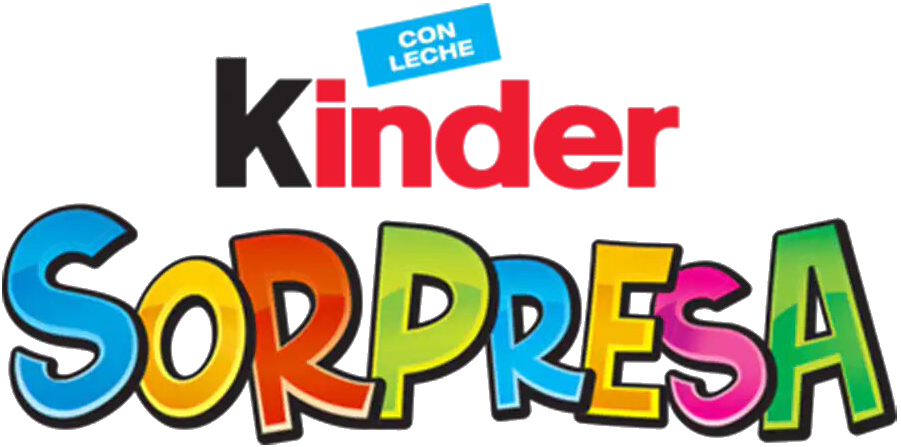
The Italian and Spanish logo

The German version of the first Kinder Surprise logo

In 1968, Michele Ferrero raised the idea with his employees of a product that could be given to children so they could have a little "surprise" every day, based on the Italian tradition of large chocolate eggs given to children by their parents at Easter. Ferrero said that at first his attempt to follow through with this idea was unsuccessful after employees questioned the order he placed for a machine to make the chocolate eggs. They thought it would not make any money, since eggs are only for Easter. Ferrero also said that he wanted the product to have a higher milk content and make that a key part of its promotion; he believed mothers would respond well to the idea of giving their children more milk. Ferrero commissioned William Salice to realize the concept.

The Italian company Ferrero began manufacturing Kinder Surprises in 1974. Since then around 30 billion eggs have been sold worldwide.

Salice, who has been credited as the inventor of Kinder Surprise but insisted he was just "material executor", died in Italy on 29 December 2016, at the age of 83.

== Collections and promotion ==
The toys within Kinder Surprise have been themed for various popular licensed characters. Collections of Kinder Surprise toys have included Asterix, Fantomimi, Smurfs, and Minions. Ferrero and Kinder have also partnered with various companies, institutions, and people to promote Kinder Surprise, including The Walt Disney Company, Universal, and Smart.

== Safety concern ==
=== United Kingdom ===
In 2000, three families who had lost children to choking on toys that had come with chocolate eggs campaigned for the products to be withdrawn from the European Union.

Defenders of the chocolates said that these had been unfortunate fatalities. This was discussed in the House of Commons and also by the Department of Trade and Industry which said: "The child's tragic death was caused by the ingestion of a small part of the egg's contents. Many other products and toys with small parts are available in the market place. If we were to start banning every product that could be swallowed by a child, there would be very few toys left in the market".

=== United States ===
A 1938 law, the Federal Food, Drug, and Cosmetic Act, prohibits confectionery products that contain a "non-nutritive object", unless the non-nutritive object has functional value. Essentially, the Act bans "the sale of any candy that has embedded in it a toy or trinket".

In 1997, the staff of the Consumer Product Safety Commission examined and issued a recall for some Kinder Surprise illegally brought into the US with foreign labels. The staff determined that the toys within the eggs had small parts. The staff presumed that Kinder Surprise, being a chocolate product, was intended for children of all ages, including those under three years of age. On this basis, the staff took the position that Kinder Surprise was in violation of the small parts regulation and should be banned from importation into the US.

Kinder Surprise eggs are legal in Canada and Mexico, but are illegal to import into the US. In January 2011, the US Customs and Border Protection (CBP) threatened a Manitoba resident with a 300 Canadian dollar fine for carrying one egg across the US border into Minnesota. In June 2012, CBP held two Seattle men for two and a half hours after discovering six Kinder Surprise eggs in their car upon returning to the US from a trip to Vancouver. According to Joseph Cummings of Seattle, Washington, one of the men detained, a border guard quoted the potential fine as "$2,500 per egg".

In 2012, the Food and Drug Administration (FDA) re-issued their import alert stating that "the embedded non-nutritive objects in these confectionery products may pose a public health risk as the consumer may unknowingly choke on the object".

Kinder Surprise bears warnings advising the consumer that the toy is "not suitable for children under three years, due to the presence of small parts", and that "adult supervision is recommended".

As of 2017 Kinder Joy eggs, a similar product, are being sold in the United States. Instead of a toy being encased in a chocolate egg, it is in an egg-shaped plastic package with the toy and chocolate separated. Kinder Surprise eggs are still illegal in the US, but remain popular on the black market.

The chocolate content of the Kinder Surprise and Kinder Joy is what differentiates them. Kinder Joy has a spoon to eat a creme inside, while Kinder Surprise is two-layer chocolate: milk chocolate on the outside and white chocolate on the inside.

=== Chile ===
In 2016, new food labeling and packaging laws banning the use of toys as promotional incentives for unhealthy foods resulted in Chile banning the Kinder Surprise.

=== Belgium ===
In 2022, the Belgian food agency reported about 20 cases of salmonella in Belgium due to contaminated Kinder Surprise eggs.

=== Canada ===
In 2022, Ferrero Canada Ltd. recalled 23 Kinder brand chocolate products in Canada. The recall included Kinder Surprise 100 g, and other products containing them. According to the Canadian Food Inspection Agency (CFIA), the recall was voluntary. No illnesses were associated due to the consumption of the product.

== See also ==
- Easter egg
- Capsule toy
- Choco Treasure
- List of confectionery brands
- Wonder Ball
