= Kinder Chocolate =

Italian candy brand

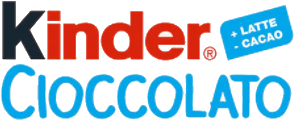
- Logo used in its native country, Italy

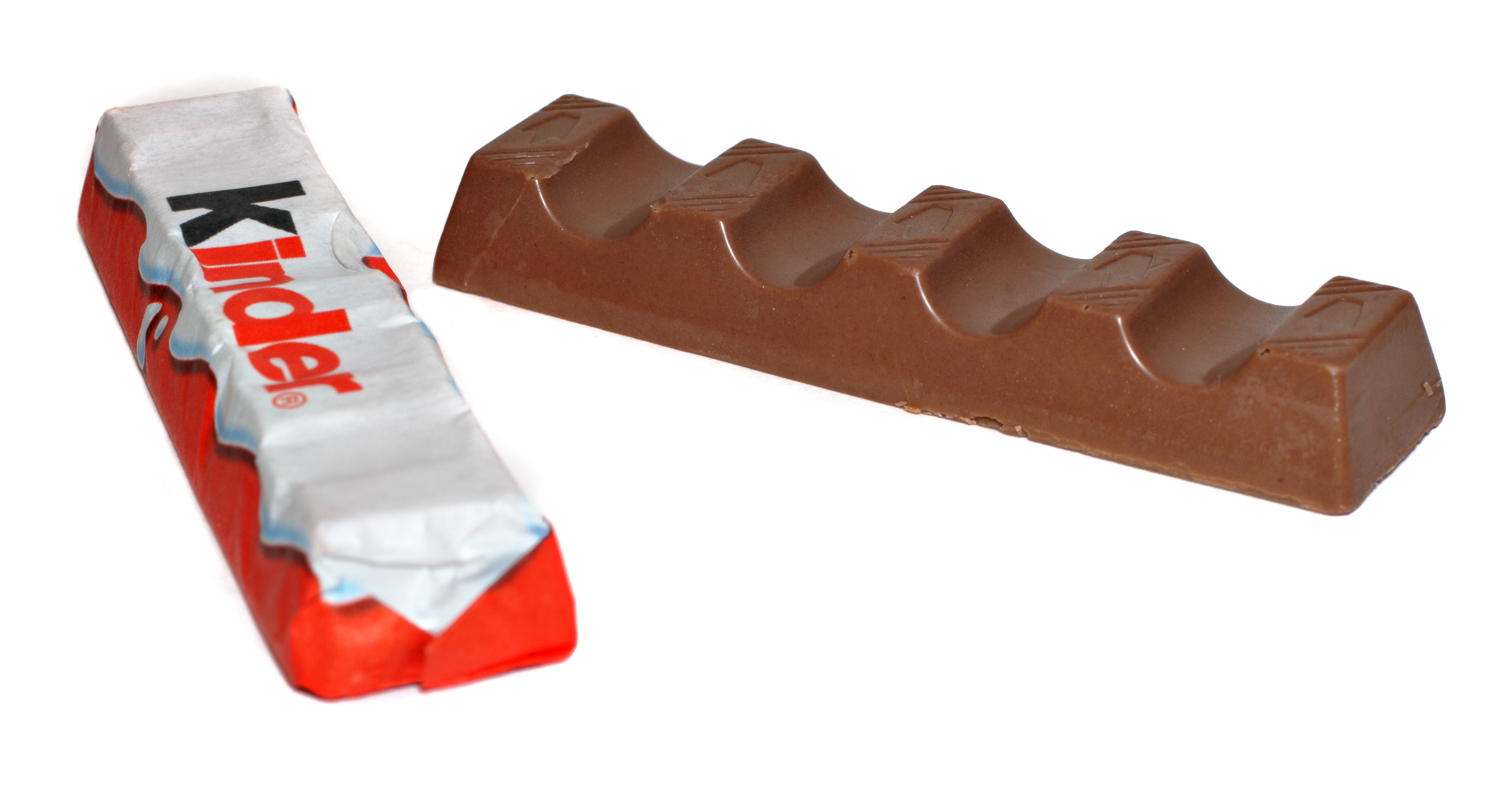
- Product type: Chocolate bar
- Current owner: Ferrero SpA
- Country: Italy
- Introduced: 24 October 1968; 58 years ago
- Website: ferrero.it/Kinder-Cioccolato

Nutritional info
Nutritional value per 100 g (3.5 oz)
- Energy: 236 kJ (56 kcal)
- Carbohydrates: 53.5
- Sugars: 53 g
- Fat: 34.8 g
- Saturated: 22.6 g
- Protein: 8.7 g
Vitamins and minerals
Minerals	Quantity %DV^{†}
Sodium	37% 853 mg
- ^{†}Percentages estimated using US recommendations for adults.

Kinder Chocolate (Italian: Kinder Cioccolato) is a brand of chocolate bar produced by Italian multinational confectionery company Ferrero SpA.

== History ==
In Alba, Italy, in 1968, Michele Ferrero, proposed to market a product that was palatable to children (with chocolate) and at the same time reassuring to mothers (with milk), thus the slogan "+ milk (latte) – cocoa (cacao)" shown on the package. Kinder Chocolate, a milk chocolate with a milky filling, was introduced to the German and Italian markets in the same year. The word "Kinder", used as a universal brand, is German for "children". The product gained commercial success, and was later sold in other European countries. The face of a child is depicted (first by Günter Euringer, then by Matteo Farneti) on the right side of Kinder Chocolate bar packages to suggest to buyers the idea of a product for children.
