= Cline (biology) =

Gradual variation of the characteristics of a species along its territory

In biology, a cline is a measurable gradient in a single characteristic (or biological trait) of a species across its geographical range. Clines usually have a genetic (e.g. allele frequency, blood type), or phenotypic (e.g. body size, skin pigmentation) character. They can show either smooth, continuous gradation in a character, or more abrupt changes in the trait from one geographic region to the next.

A cline is a spatial gradient in a single specific trait, rather than in a collection of traits; a single population can therefore have as many clines as it has traits, at least in principle. Additionally, as Julian Huxley recognised, these multiple independent clines may not act in concordance with each other. For example, it has been observed that in Australia, birds generally become smaller the further towards the north of the country they are found. In contrast, the intensity of their plumage colouration follows a different geographical trajectory, being most vibrant where humidity is highest and becoming less vibrant further into the arid centre of the country. Because of this, Huxley described the notion of clines as an "auxiliary taxonomic principle,” meaning that clinal variation in a species is not awarded taxonomic recognition in the way subspecies or species are.

The term cline was coined by Huxley in 1938 from the Greek κλίνειν klinein, meaning "to lean.” While it and the term ecotype are sometimes used interchangeably, they do in fact differ in that ecotype refers to a population which differs from other populations in a number of characters, rather than the single character that varies among populations in a cline.

== Drivers and the evolution of clines ==
Two populations with individuals moving between the populations to demonstrate gene flow

Clines are often cited to be the result of two opposing drivers: selection and gene flow (also known as migration). Selection causes adaptation to the local environment, resulting in different genotypes or phenotypes being favoured in different environments. This diversifying force is countered by gene flow, which has a homogenising effect on populations and prevents speciation through causing genetic admixture and blurring any distinct genetic boundaries.

=== Development of clines ===
Clines are generally thought to arise under one of two conditions: "primary differentiation" (also known as "primary contact" or "primary intergradation"), or "secondary contact" (also known as "secondary introgression", or "secondary intergradation").

==== Primary differentiation ====
Primary differentiation is demonstrated using the peppered moth as an example, with a change in an environmental variable such as sooty coverage of trees imposing a selective pressure on a previously uniformly coloured moth population. This causes the frequency of melanic morphs to increase the more soot there is on vegetation.

Clines produced through this way are generated by spatial heterogeneity in environmental conditions. The mechanism of selection acting upon organisms is therefore external. Species ranges frequently span environmental gradients (e.g. humidity, rainfall, temperature, or day length) and, according to natural selection, different environments will favour different genotypes or phenotypes. In this way, when previously genetically or phenotypically uniform populations spread into novel environments, they will evolve to be uniquely adapted to the local environment, in the process potentially creating a gradient in a genotypic or phenotypic trait.

Such clines in characters can not be maintained through selection alone if much gene flow occurred between populations, as this would tend to swamp out the effects of local adaptation. However, because species usually tend to have a limited dispersal range (e.g. in an isolation by distance model), restricted gene flow can serve as a type of barrier which encourages geographic differentiation. However, some degree of migration is often required to maintain a cline; without it, speciation is likely to eventually occur, as local adaptation can cause reproductive isolation between populations.

A classic example of the role of environmental gradients in creating clines is that of the peppered moth, Biston betularia, in the UK. During the 19th century, when the industrial sector gained traction, coal emissions blackened vegetation across northwest England and parts of northern Wales. As a result of this, lighter morphs of the moth were more visible to predators against the blackened tree trunks and were therefore more heavily predated relative to the darker morphs. Consequently, the frequency of the more cryptic melanic morph of the peppered moth increased drastically in northern England. This cline in morph colour, from a dominance of lighter morphs in the west of England (which did not suffer as heavily from pollution), to the higher frequency of melanic forms in the north, has slowly been degrading since limitations to sooty emissions were introduced in the 1960s.

==== Secondary contact ====
Secondary contact between two previously isolated populations. Two previously isolated populations establish contact and therefore gene flow, creating an intermediate zone in the phenotypic or genotypic character between the two populations.

Clines generated through this mechanism have arisen through the joining of two formerly isolated populations which differentiated in allopatry, creating an intermediate zone. This secondary contact scenario may occur, for example, when climatic conditions change, allowing the ranges of populations to expand and meet. Because over time the effect of gene flow will tend to eventually swamp out any regional differences and cause one large homogenous population, for a stable cline to be maintained when two populations join there must usually be a selective pressure maintaining a degree of differentiation between the two populations.

The mechanism of selection maintaining the clines in this scenario is often intrinsic. This means that the fitness of individuals is independent of the external environment, and selection is instead dependent on the genome of the individual. Intrinsic, or endogenous, selection can give rise to clines in characters through a variety of mechanisms. One way it may act is through heterozygote disadvantage, in which intermediate genotypes have a lower relative fitness than either homozygote genotypes. Because of this disadvantage, one allele will tend to become fixed in a given population, such that populations will consist largely of either AA (homozygous dominant) or aa (homozygous recessive) individuals. The cline of heterozygotes that is created when these respective populations come into contact is then shaped by the opposing forces of selection and gene flow; even if selection against heterozygotes is great, if there is some degree of gene flow between the two populations, then a steep cline may be able to be maintained. Because instrinsic selection is independent of the external environment, clines generated by selection against hybrids are not fixed to any given geographical area and can move around the geographic landscape. Such hybrid zones where hybrids are a disadvantage relative to their parental lines (but which are nonetheless maintained through selection being counteracted by gene flow) are known as "tension zones".

Another way in which selection can generate clines is through frequency-dependent selection. Characters that could be maintained by such frequency-dependent selective pressures include warning signals (aposematism). For example, aposematic signals in Heliconius butterflies sometimes display steep clines between populations, which are maintained through positive frequency dependence. This is because heterozygosity, mutations and recombination can all produce patterns that deviate from those well-established signals which mark prey as being unpalatable. These individuals are then predated more heavily relative to their counterparts with "normal" markings (i.e. selected against), creating populations dominated by a particular pattern of warning signal. As with heterozygote disadvantage, when these populations join, a narrow cline of intermediate individuals could be produced, maintained by gene flow counteracting selection.

Secondary contact could lead to a cline with a steep gradient if heterozygote disadvantage or frequency-dependent selection exists, as intermediates are heavily selected against. Alternatively, steep clines could exist because the populations have only recently established secondary contact, and the character in the original allopatric populations had a large degree of differentiation. As genetic admixture between the population increases with time however, the steepness of the cline is likely to decrease as the difference in character is eroded. However, if the character in the original allopatric populations was not very differentiated to begin with, the cline between the populations need not display a very steep gradient. Because both primary differentiation and secondary contact can therefore give rise to similar or identical clinal patterns (e.g. gently sloping clines), distinguishing which of these two processes is responsible for generating a cline is difficult and often impossible. However, in some circumstances a cline and a geographic variable (such as humidity) may be very tightly linked, with a change in one corresponding closely to a change in the other. In such cases it may be tentatively concluded that the cline is generated by primary differentiation and therefore moulded by environmental selective pressures.

==== No selection (drift/migration balance) ====
While selection can therefore clearly play a key role in creating clines, it is theoretically feasible that they might be generated by genetic drift alone. It is unlikely that large-scale clines in genotype or phenotype frequency will be produced solely by drift. However, across smaller geographical scales and in smaller populations, drift could produce temporary clines. The fact that drift is a weak force upholding the cline however means that clines produced this way are often random (i.e. uncorrelated with environmental variables) and subject to breakdown or reversal over time. Such clines are therefore unstable and sometimes called "transient clines."

== Clinal structure and terminology ==
Clinal characters change from one end of the geographic range to another. The extent of this change is reflected in the slope of the cline.

The steepness, or gradient, of a cline reflects the extent of the differentiation in the character across a geographic range. For example, a steep cline could indicate large variation in the colour of plumage between adjacent bird populations. It has been previously outlined that such steep clines may be the result of two previously allopatric populations with a large degree of difference in the trait having only recently established gene flow, or where there is strong selection against hybrids. However, it may also reflect a sudden environmental change or boundary. Examples of rapidly changing environmental boundaries like this include abrupt changes in the heavy metal content of soils, and the consequent narrow clines produced between populations of Agrostis that are either adapted to these soils with high metal content, or adapted to "normal" soil. Conversely, a shallow cline indicates little geographical variation in the character or trait across a given geographical distance. This may have arisen through weak differential environmental selective pressure, or where two populations established secondary contact a long time ago and gene flow has eroded the large character differentiation between the populations.

The gradient of a cline is related to another commonly referred to property, clinal width. A cline with a steep slope is said to have a small, or narrow, width, while shallower clines have larger widths.

== Types of clines ==
Categories and subcategories of clines, as defined by Huxley

According to Huxley, clines can be classified into two categories; continuous clines and discontinuous stepped clines. These types of clines characterise the way that a genetic or phenotypic trait transforms from one end of its geographical range of the species to the other.

=== Continuous clines ===
In continuous clines, all populations of the species are able to interbreed and there is gene flow throughout the entire range of the species. In this way, these clines are both biologically (no clear subgroups) and geographically (contiguous distribution) continuous. Continuous clines can be further sub-divided into smooth and stepped clines.

- Continuous smooth clines are characterised by the lack of any abrupt changes or delineation in the genetic or phenotypic trait across the cline, instead displaying a smooth gradation throughout. Huxley recognised that this type of cline, with its uniform slope throughout, was unlikely to be common.
- Continuous stepped clines consist of an overall shallow cline, interspersed by sections of much steeper slope. The shallow slope represents the populations, and the shorter, steeper sections the larger change in character between populations. Stepped clines can be further subdivided into horizontally stepped clines, and obliquely stepped clines.
  - Horizontally stepped clines show no intra-population variation or gradation in the character, therefore displaying a horizontal gradient. These uniform populations are connected by steeper sections of the cline, characterised by larger changes in the form of the character. However, because in continuous clines all populations exchange genetic material, the intergradation zone between the groups can never have a vertical slope.
  - In obliquely stepped clines, conversely, each population also demonstrates a cline in the character, albeit of a shallower slope than the clines connecting the populations together. Huxley compared obliquely stepped clines to looking like a "stepped ramp", rather than taking on the formation of a staircase as in the case of horizontally stepped clines.

=== Discontinuous stepped clines ===
Unlike in continuous clines, in discontinuous clines the populations of species are allopatric, meaning there is very little or no gene flow amongst populations. The genetic or phenotypic trait in question always shows a steeper gradient between groups than within groups, as in continuous clines. Discontinuous clines follow the same principles as continuous clines by displaying either

- Horizontally stepped clines, where intra-group variation is very small or non-existent and the geographic space separating groups shows a sharp change in character
- Obliquely stepped clines, where there is some intra-group gradation, but this is less than the gradation in the character between populations

== Clines and speciation ==
Parapatric speciation

It was originally assumed that geographic isolation was a necessary precursor to speciation (allopatric speciation). The possibility that clines may be a precursor to speciation was therefore ignored, as they were assumed to be evidence of the fact that in contiguous populations gene flow was too strong a force of homogenisation, and selection too weak a force of differentiation, for speciation to take place. However, the existence of particular types of clines, such as ring species, in which populations did not differentiate in allopatry but the terminal ends of the cline nonetheless do not interbreed, cast into doubt whether complete geographical isolation of populations is an absolute requirement for speciation.

Because clines can exist in populations connected by some degree of gene flow, the generation of new species from a previously clinal population is termed parapatric speciation. Both extrinsic and intrinsic selection can serve to generate varying degrees of reproductive isolation and thereby instigate the process of speciation. For example, through environmental selection acting on populations and favouring particular allele frequencies, large genetic differences between populations may accumulate (this would be reflected in clinal structure by the presence of numerous very steep clines). If the local genetic differences are great enough, it may lead unfavourable combinations of genotypes and therefore to hybrids being at a decreased fitness relative to the parental lines. When this hybrid disadvantage is great enough, natural selection will select for pre-zygotic traits in the homozygous parental lines that reduce the likelihood of disadvantageous hybridisation - in other words, natural selection will favour traits that promote assortative mating in the parental lines. This is known as reinforcement and plays an important role in parapatric and sympatric speciation.

== Clinal maps ==
Clines can be portrayed graphically on maps using lines that show the transition in character state from one end of the geographic range to the other. Character states can however additionally be represented using isophenes, defined by Ernst Mayr as "lines of equal expression of a clinally varying character". In other words, areas on maps that demonstrate the same biological phenomenon or character will be connected by something that resembles a contour line. When mapping clines therefore, which follow a character gradation from one extreme to the other, isophenes will transect clinal lines at a right angle.

== Examples of clines ==
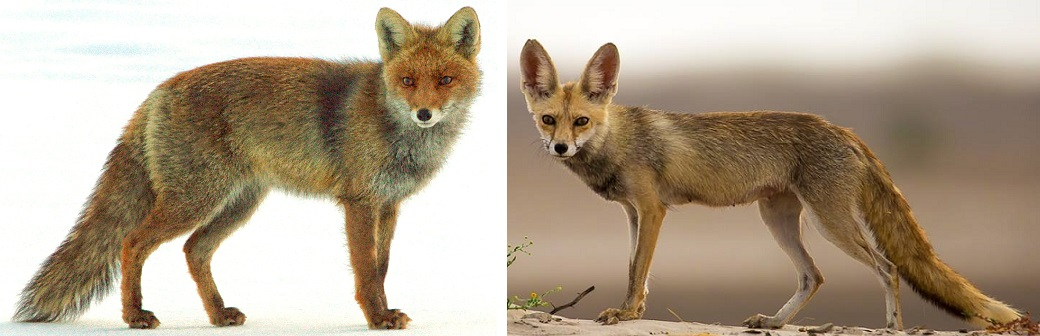
Bergmann's Rule demonstrated showing the difference in size between a larger northern fox, whose range spans colder regions, and a smaller desert fox, whose range is primarily in hot regions

Although the term "cline" was first officially coined by Huxley in 1938, gradients and geographic variations in the character states of species have been observed for centuries. Indeed, some gradations have been considered so ubiquitous that they have been labelled ecological "rules". One commonly cited example of a gradient in morphology is Gloger's Rule, named after Constantin Gloger, who observed in 1833 that environmental factors and the pigmentation of avian plumage tend to covary with each other, such that birds found in arid areas near the Equator tend to be much darker than those in less arid areas closer to the Poles. Since then, this rule has been extended to include many other animals, including flies, butterflies, and wolves.

Other ecogeographical rules include Bergmann's Rule, coined by Carl Bergmann in 1857, which states that homeotherms closer to the Equator tend to be smaller than their more northerly or southerly conspecifics. One of the proposed reasons for this cline is that larger animals have a relatively smaller surface area to volume ratio and therefore improved heat conservancy – an important advantage in cold climates. The role of the environment in imposing a selective pressure and producing this cline has been heavily implicated due to the fact that Bergmann's Rule has been observed across many independent lineages of species and continents. For example, the house sparrow, which was introduced in the early 1850s to the eastern United States, evolved a north-south gradient in size soon after its introduction. This gradient reflects the gradient that already existed in the house sparrow's native range in Europe.

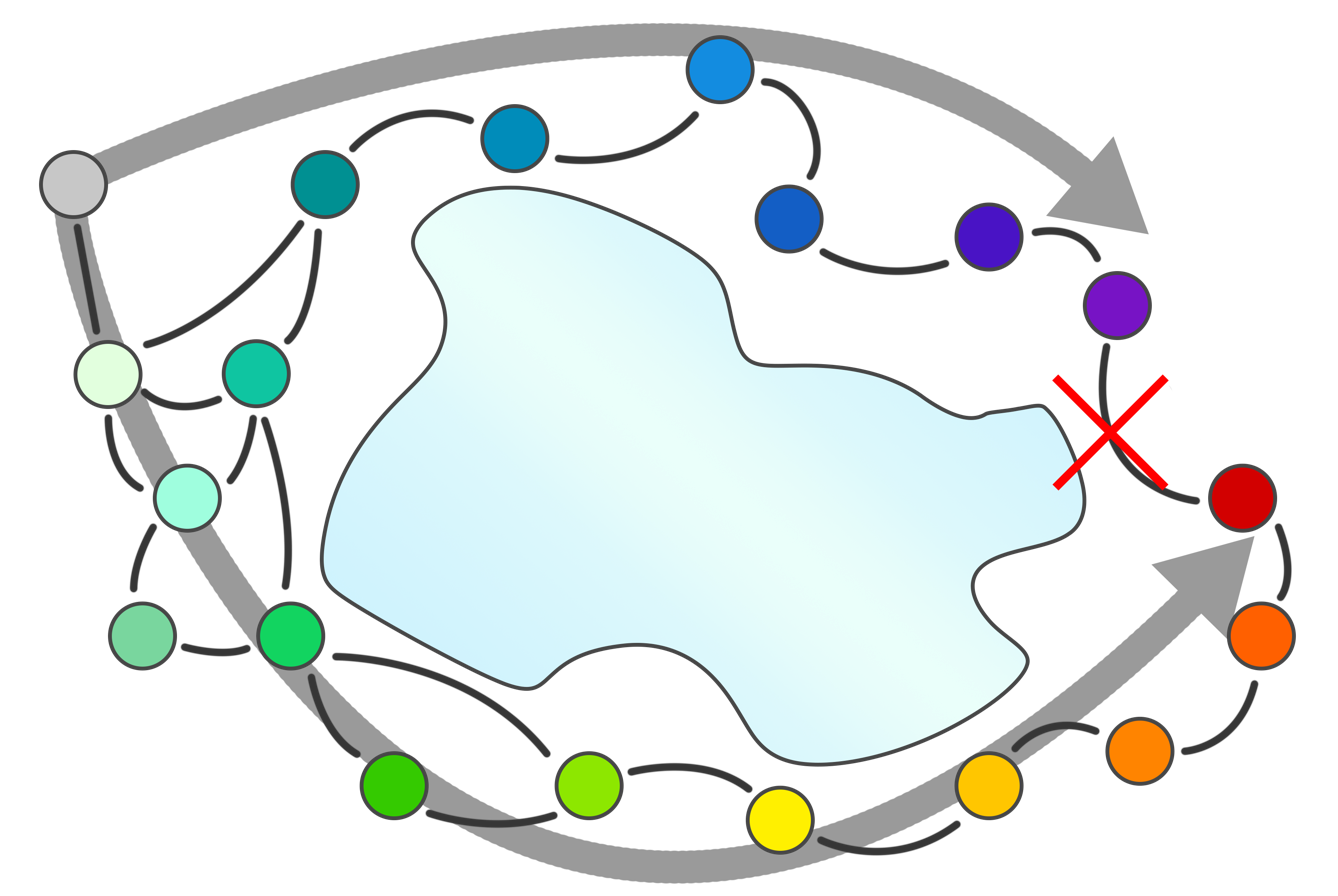
Interbreeding populations represented by a gradient of coloured circles around a geographic barrier

The Larus gulls interbreed in a ring around the arctic. 1: Larus argentatus argentatus, 2: Larus fuscus (sensu stricto), 3: Larus fuscus heuglini, 4: Larus argentatus birulai, 5: Larus argentatus vegae, 6: Larus argentatus smithsonianus, 7: Larus argentatus argenteus

Ring species are a distinct type of cline where the geographical distribution in question is circular in shape, so that the two ends of the cline overlap with one another, giving two adjacent populations that rarely interbreed due to the cumulative effect of the many changes in phenotype along the cline. The populations elsewhere along the cline interbreed with their geographically adjacent populations as in a standard cline. In the case of Larus gulls, the habitats of the end populations even overlap, which introduces questions as to what constitutes a species: nowhere along the cline can a line be drawn between the populations, but they are unable to interbreed.

In humans, clines in the frequency of blood types has allowed scientists to infer past population migrations. For example, the Type B blood group reaches its highest frequency in Asia, but become less frequent further west. From this, it has been possible to infer that some Asian populations migrated towards Europe around 2,000 years ago, causing genetic admixture in an isolation by distance model. In contrast to this cline, blood Type A shows the reverse pattern, reaching its highest frequency in Europe and declining in frequency towards Asia.
