= Bernhard Rensch =

German evolutionary biologist and ornithologist (1900–1990)

- Bernhard Rensch
- Born: 21 January 1900; Thale, Germany
- Died: 4 April 1990 (aged 90)
- Known for: Modern evolutionary synthesis
- Awards: Darwin-Wallace Medal (Silver, 1958)
- Scientific career
- Fields: Ornithology

Bernhard Rensch (21 January 1900 – 4 April 1990) was a German evolutionary biologist and ornithologist who did field work in Indonesia and India. Starting his scientific career with pro-Lamarckian views, he shifted to selectionism and became one of the architects of the modern synthesis in evolutionary biology, which he popularised in Germany. Besides his work on how environmental factors influenced the evolution of geographically isolated populations and on evolution above the species level, which contributed to the modern synthesis, he also worked extensively in the area of animal behavior (ethology) and on philosophical aspects of biological science. His education and scientific work were interrupted by service in the German military during both World War I and World War II.

== Biography ==
Rensch was born in Thale and as a young boy, he took an interest in observing the natural world and discovered a talent for drawing and painting. He served in the German army from 1917 to 1920 and began to observe natural phenomena while he was held prisoner in France. He returned to Germany and began his studies on feather structure under Valentin Haecker (1864–1927) who had himself studied under August Weismann. Until the 1930s Rensch held anti-Darwinian and Lamarckian views. Rensch also took an interest in the philosophy of science and was fascinated by Theodor Ziehen (1862–1950). Rensch also studied expressionist painting and in later life examined the biological roots of art. He received his Ph.D. from the University of Halle in 1922. He joined the zoological museum of the University of Berlin as an assistant in 1925. In 1927 he participated in a zoological expedition to the Sunda Islands. He studied the geographical distribution of subspecies of polytypic species and of complexes of closely related species with attention to how local environmental factors, especially climate, influenced their evolution. In 1929 he published the book Das Prinzip geographischer Rassenkreise und das Problem der Artbildung that discussed the relationship between geography and speciation. His work in this area would influence Ernst Mayr, who was also an assistant at the museum from 1927 to 1930, and would contribute to the development of the modern evolutionary synthesis. In 1937 he was forced to leave the museum because he refused to join the Nazi party, and took a position at a zoological garden in Münster. In 1940 he was recalled for military service, but was discharged for medical reasons in 1942.

In 1947 he published a book that would later be translated into English under the title Evolution above the species level. The book discussed how the evolutionary mechanisms that drove speciation could also explain the differences between higher taxa. He introduced the concept of Artenkreis (which Mayr translated as a "superspecies" and defined as "a monophyletic group of closely related and largely or entirely allopatric species”). It was considered a major document in the modern synthesis. That same year he became chairman of the zoology department and director of the zoological institute at the University of Münster. In 1953 he would take part in a zoological expedition to India. Later in his career he would work extensively in the areas of animal behavior (ethology), learning, and memory. Rensch also wrote on human behaviour and he suggested that the human evolutionary connection with organisms would lead to sympathy. He published an autobiography in 1979 and remained scientifically active until his death in 1990.

== Biological rules ==
Rensche sought out universal patterns in biology. He was responsible for naming Allen's Rule and Gloger's Rule, and proposed what is now called Rensch's rule in 1950. It is an allometric law about the relationship between sexual size dimorphism and which sex is larger. It observes that across species size dimorphism increases with increasing body size when the male is the larger sex, and decreases with increasing average body size when the female is the larger sex.

== Awards and recognition ==
He was awarded the Linnean Society of London's prestigious Darwin-Wallace Medal in 1958.

Since 2004, the German Society for Biological Systematics (GfBS) has awarded the Bernhard Rensch prize for achievements of young scientists, writing in German or English, in the field of systematics and biodiversity research.

A species of Indonesian lizard, Cryptoblepharus renschi, is named in his honor.

== Works ==
This is a select list of books alone and includes English translations.

- (1930) Eine biologische Reise nach den kleinen Sunda-Inseln. Berlin: Bornträger
- (1947) Neuere Probleme der Abstammungslehre. F. Enke. 1947.
- (1947) Evolution above the Species Level. London: Methuen. (German original 1947; 3rd enlarged ed. 1972.)
- (1971) Biophilosophy. New York: Columbia University Press. (German original 1968.)
- (1972) Homo sapiens: From Man to Demigod. London: Methuen. (German original 1959.)
- (1973) Gedächtnis, Begriffsbildung und Planhandlungen bei Tieren. Berlin: Parey.
- (1979) Lebensweg eines Biologen in einem turbulenten Jahrhundert. Stuttgart: Fischer.
- (1979) Gesetzlichkeit, psychophysischer Zusammenhang, Willensfreiheit und Ethik. Berlin: Duncker and Humblot.
- (1984) Psychologische Grundlagen der Wertung bildender Kunst. Essen: Die blaue Eule.
- (1985) Biophilosophical Implications of Inorganic and Organismic Evolution. Essen: Die blaue Eule.

Academic offices
Preceded by Hermann Reichling	Director of the Westphalian Museum of Natural History; 1937 – 1956	Succeeded by Ludwig Franzisket
