= Jordan's rule =

Jordan's rule (sense 1) is an ecogeographical rule that describes the inverse relationship between water temperature and meristic characteristics in various species of fish. The most commonly observed relationship is that fin ray, vertebrae, or scale numbers increase with decreasing temperature. The rule is named after David Starr Jordan (1851–1931), the father of American ichthyology.

Jordan's law (or rule) (sense 2) is also an ecogeographical rule (named after the same scientist) that states: "‘[g]iven any species in any region, the nearest related species is not likely to be found in the same region nor in a remote region, but in a neighbouring district separated from the first by a barrier of some sort’ This "rule" is frequently violated (see discussion in Fitzpatrick & Turelli 2007), but when patterns are consistent with Jordan's rule (sense 2), this suggests an important role for allopatric speciation in the diversification of the clade in question. Jordan himself wrote: "To this generalization Dr. Allen, in a late number of Science, gives the name of 'Jordan's Law.' The present writer makes no claim to the discovery of this law. The language above quoted is his, but the idea is familiar to all students of geographical distribution and goes back to the master in that field, Moritz Wagner." Thus, Jordan's law is an example of Stigler's law.

== See also ==
- Allen's rule
- Allopatric speciation
- Bergman's rule
- Jordan's Principle
