= Tamás Székely =

Tamás Székely may refer to:

- Tamás Székely (skier) (1923 – 1976), Hungarian alpine skier
- Tamás Székely (biologist) (born 1959), Hungarian evolutionary biologist and conservationist
- Tamás Székely, Hungarian sound editor and recipient of the Silver Bear for Outstanding Artistic Contribution for Katalin Varga
