= Eichler's rule =

Coevolutionary principle regerding parasites and hosts

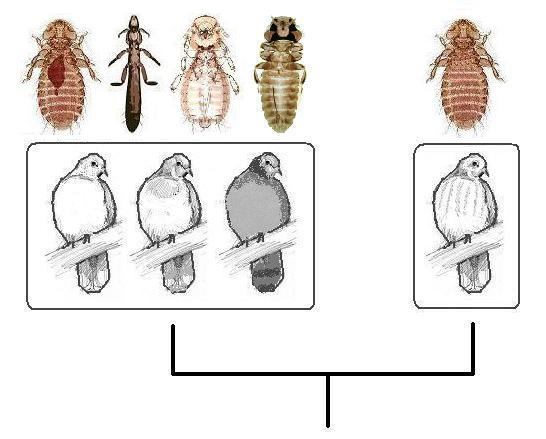
When comparing host sister clades we tend to find taxonomically richer parasite fauna on the taxonomically richer group of hosts.

Eichler's rule is one of several coevolutionary rules which states that parasites tend to be highly specific to their hosts, and thus it seems reasonable to expect a positive co-variation between the taxonomic richness of hosts and that of their parasites.

== History ==
A rule to describe the taxonomic relationship between parasites and their hosts was developed in 1942 by Wolfdietrich Eichler (1912–1994), a German authority in zoology and parasitology who served as a professor of parasitology at Leipzig University. The principle was later dubbed 'Eichler's rule'. It is one of the first three coevolutionary rules, created in opposition to Heinrich Fahrenholz's research into coevolution.

== Research ==
As a part of their 2012 study, Vas and his co-authors tested Eichler's rule, and concluded that exceptionally strong correlational evidence supports the positive co-variation between the species richness of avian and mammalian families and the generic richness of their parasitic lice.

In volume nine of Advances in Parasitology, parasitologist W. Grant Inglis posited that, when studying the co-variation between the taxonomic richness of hosts and parasites, it is easier to study parasites than free-living host organisms.
