= Surface-area-to-volume ratio =

Surface area per unit volume

Graphs of surface area, A against volume, V of the Platonic solids and a sphere, showing that the surface area decreases for rounder shapes (higher sphericity), and the surface-area-to-volume ratio decreases with increasing volume. Their intercepts with the dashed lines show that when the volume increases 8 (2³) times, the surface area increases 4 (2²) times.

The surface-area-to-volume ratio or surface-to-volume ratio (denoted as SA:V, SA/V, or sa/vol) is the ratio between surface area and volume of an object or collection of objects.

SA:V is an important concept in science and engineering. It is used to explain the relation between structure and function in processes occurring through the surface and the volume. Good examples for such processes are processes governed by the heat equation, that is, diffusion and heat transfer by thermal conduction. SA:V is used to explain the diffusion of small molecules, like oxygen and carbon dioxide between air, blood and cells, water loss by animals, bacterial morphogenesis, organisms' thermoregulation, design of artificial bone tissue, artificial lungs and many more biological and biotechnological structures. For more examples see Glazier.

The relation between SA:V and diffusion or heat conduction rate is explained from flux and surface perspective, focusing on the surface of a body as the place where diffusion, or heat conduction, takes place, i.e., the larger the SA:V there is more surface area per unit volume through which material can diffuse, therefore, the diffusion or heat conduction, will be faster. Similar explanation appears in the literature: "Small size implies a large ratio of surface area to volume, thereby helping to maximize the uptake of nutrients across the plasma membrane", and elsewhere.

For a given volume, the object with the smallest surface area (and therefore with the smallest SA:V) is a ball, a consequence of the isoperimetric inequality in 3 dimensions. By contrast, objects with acute-angled spikes will have very large surface area for a given volume.

== For solid spheres ==
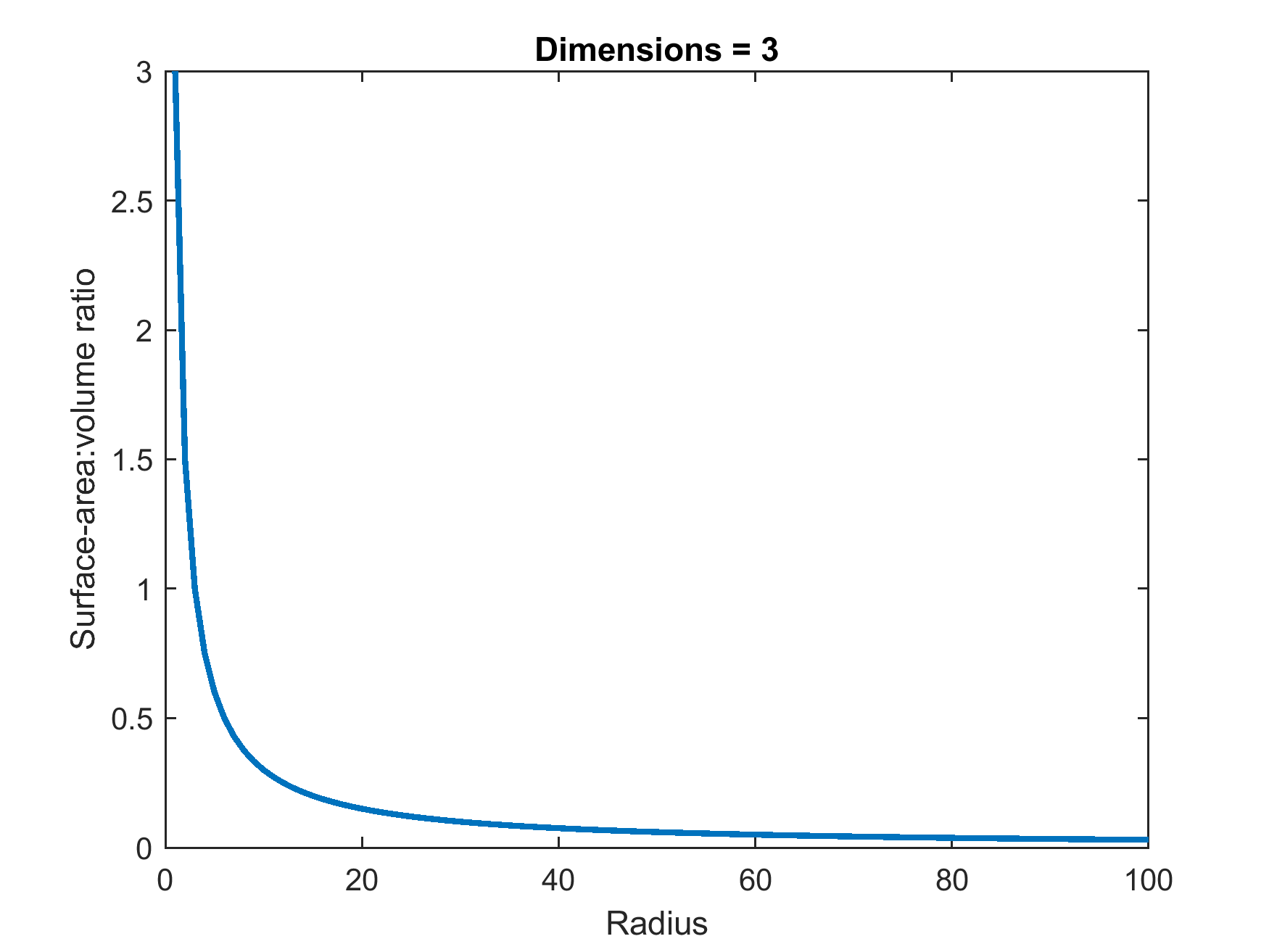
Plot of the surface-area:volume ratio (SA:V) for a 3-dimensional ball, showing the ratio declining inversely as the radius of the ball increases.

A solid sphere or ball is a three-dimensional object, being the solid figure bounded by a sphere. (In geometry, the term sphere properly refers only to the surface, so a sphere thus lacks volume in this context.)

For an ordinary three-dimensional ball, the SA:V can be calculated using the standard equations for the surface and volume, which are, respectively, $SA=4\pi{r^2}$ and $V=(4/3)\pi{r^3}$. For the unit case in which r = 1 the SA:V is thus 3. For the general case, SA:V equals 3/r, in an inverse relationship with the radius - if the radius is doubled, the SA:V halves (see figure).

=== For n-dimensional balls ===
Graphs of volumes ($V_n$) and surface areas ($S_{n-1}$) of n-balls of radius 1.

Balls exist in any dimension and are generically called n-balls or hyperballs, where n is the number of dimensions. The same reasoning can be generalized to n-balls using the general equations for volume and surface area, which are:

$$V=\frac{r^n\pi^{n/2}}{\Gamma(1+n/2)}$$
$$SA=\frac{nr^{n-1}\pi^{n/2}}{\Gamma(1+{n/2})}$$

So the ratio equals $SA/V=nr^{-1}$. Thus, the same linear relationship between area and volume holds for any number of dimensions (see figure): doubling the radius always halves the ratio.

== Dimension and units ==
The surface-area-to-volume ratio has physical dimension inverse length (L^{−1}) and is therefore expressed in units of inverse metre (m^{−1}) or its prefixed unit multiples and submultiples. As an example, a cube with sides of length 1 cm will have a surface area of 6 cm^{2} and a volume of 1 cm^{3}. The surface to volume ratio for this cube is thus

$$\mbox{SA:V} = \frac{6~\mbox{cm}^2}{1~\mbox{cm}^3} = 6~\mbox{cm}^{-1}$$.

For a given shape, SA:V is inversely proportional to size. A cube 2 cm on a side has a ratio of 3 cm^{−1}, half that of a cube 1 cm on a side. Conversely, preserving SA:V as size increases requires changing to a less compact shape.

== Applications ==
=== Physical chemistry ===
Materials with high surface area to volume ratio (e.g. very small diameter, very porous, or otherwise not compact) react at much faster rates than monolithic materials, because more surface is available to react. See Dust explosion. An example is grain dust: while grain is not typically flammable, grain dust is explosive. Finely ground salt dissolves much more quickly than coarse salt.

A high surface area to volume ratio provides a strong "driving force" to speed up thermodynamic processes that minimize free energy.

=== Biology ===
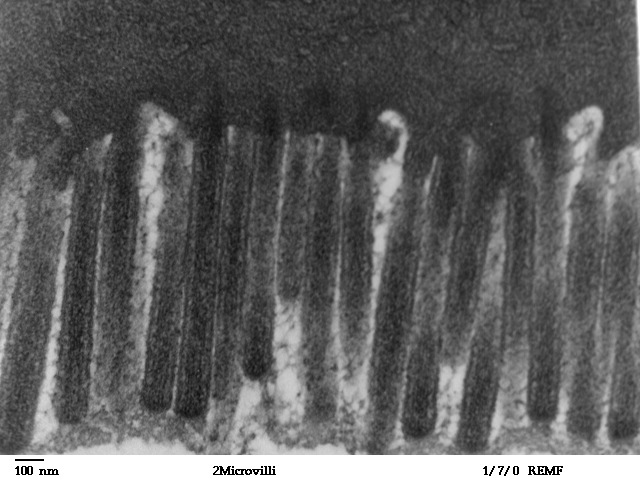
Cells lining the small intestine increase the surface area over which they can absorb nutrients with a carpet of tuftlike microvilli.

The ratio between the surface area and volume of cells and organisms has an enormous impact on their biology, including their physiology and behavior. For example, many aquatic microorganisms have increased surface area to increase their drag in the water. This reduces their rate of sink and allows them to remain near the surface with less energy expenditure.

An increased surface area to volume ratio also means increased exposure to the environment. The finely-branched appendages of filter feeders such as krill provide a large surface area to sift the water for food.

Individual organs like the lung have numerous internal branchings that increase the surface area; in the case of the lung, the large surface supports gas exchange, bringing oxygen into the blood and releasing carbon dioxide from the blood. Similarly, the small intestine has a finely wrinkled internal surface, allowing the body to absorb nutrients efficiently.

Cells can achieve a high surface area to volume ratio with an elaborately convoluted surface, like the microvilli lining the small intestine.

Increased surface area can also lead to biological problems. More contact with the environment through the surface of a cell or an organ (relative to its volume) increases loss of water and dissolved substances. High surface area to volume ratios also present problems of temperature control in unfavorable environments.

The surface to volume ratios of organisms of different sizes also leads to some biological rules such as Allen's rule, Bergmann's rule and gigantothermy.

=== Fire spread ===
In the context of wildfires, the ratio of the surface area of a solid fuel to its volume is an important measurement. Fire spread behavior is frequently correlated to the surface-area-to-volume ratio of the fuel (e.g. leaves and branches). The higher its value, the faster a particle responds to changes in environmental conditions, such as temperature or moisture. Higher values are also correlated to shorter fuel ignition times, and hence faster fire spread rates.

=== Planetary cooling ===
A body of icy or rocky material in outer space may, if it can build and retain sufficient heat, develop a differentiated interior and alter its surface through volcanic or tectonic activity. The length of time through which a planetary body can maintain surface-altering activity depends on how well it retains heat, and this is governed by its surface area-to-volume ratio. For Vesta (r=263 km), the ratio is so high that astronomers were surprised to find that it did differentiate and have brief volcanic activity. The Moon, Mercury and Mars have radii in the low thousands of kilometers; all three retained heat well enough to be thoroughly differentiated although after a billion years or so they became too cool to show anything more than very localized and infrequent volcanic activity. As of April 2019, however, NASA has announced the detection of a "marsquake" measured on April 6, 2019, by NASA's InSight lander. Venus and Earth (r>6,000 km) have sufficiently low surface area-to-volume ratios (roughly half that of Mars and much lower than all other known rocky bodies) so that their heat loss is minimal.

== Mathematical examples ==
Shape	Image	Characteristic length $a$	SA/V ratio	SA/V ratio for unit volume
Tetrahedron		edge	$\frac{6\sqrt{6}}{a} \approx \frac{14.697}{a}$	7.21
Cube		edge	$\frac{6}{a}$	6
Octahedron		edge	$\frac{3\sqrt{6}}{a} \approx \frac{7.348}{a}$	5.72
Dodecahedron		edge	$\frac{12\sqrt{25+10\sqrt{5}}}{(15+7\sqrt{5})a} \approx \frac{2.694}{a}$	5.31
Capsule		radius (R)	$\frac{12}{5a}$	5.251
Icosahedron		edge	$\frac{12 \sqrt{3}}{(3+\sqrt{5})a} \approx \frac{3.970}{a}$	5.148
Sphere		radius	$\frac{3}{a}$	4.83598

Examples of cubes of different sizes
Side of cube a	a^{2}	Area of a single face	6a^{2}	Area of entire cube (6 faces)	a^{3}	Volume	Ratio of surface area to volume =6a^{2}/a^{3} =6/a
2	2×2	4	6×4	24	2×2×2	8	3:1
4	4×4	16	6×16	96	4×4×4	64	3:2
6	6×6	36	6×36	216	6×6×6	216	3:3
8	8×8	64	6×64	384	8×8×8	512	3:4
12	12×12	144	6×144	864	12×12×12	1,728	3:6
20	20×20	400	6×400	2,400	20×20×20	8,000	3:10
50	50×50	2,500	6×2,500	15,000	50×50×50	125,000	3:25
1,000	1,000×1,000	1,000,000	6×1,000,000	6,000,000	1,000×1,000×1,000	1,000,000,000	3:500

== See also ==
- Compactness measure of a shape
- Dust explosion
- On Being the Right Size
- Square–cube law
- Specific surface area
