= Cold and heat adaptations in humans =

Cold and heat adaptations in humans are a part of the broad adaptability of Homo sapiens. Adaptations in humans can be physiological, genetic, or cultural, which allow people to live in a wide variety of climates. There has been a great deal of research done on developmental adjustment, acclimatization, and cultural practices, but less research on genetic adaptations to colder and hotter temperatures.

The human body always works to remain in homeostasis. One form of homeostasis is thermoregulation. Body temperature varies in every individual, but the average internal temperature is 37.0 °C (98.6 °F). Sufficient stress from extreme external temperature may cause injury or death if it exceeds the ability of the body to thermoregulate. Hypothermia can set in when the core temperature drops to 35 °C (95 °F). Hyperthermia can set in when the core body temperature rises above 37.5–38.3 °C (99.5–100.9 °F). Humans have adapted to living in climates where hypothermia and hyperthermia were common primarily through culture and technology, such as the use of clothing and shelter.

== Origin of cold and heat adaptations ==
Modern humans emerged from Africa approximately 70,000 years ago during a period of unstable climate, leading to a variety of new traits among the population. When modern humans spread into Europe, they outcompeted Neanderthals. Researchers hypothesize that this suggests early modern humans were more evolutionarily fit to live in various climates. This is supported in the variability selection hypothesis proposed by Richard Potts, which says that human adaptability came from environmental change over the long term.

=== Ecogeographic rules ===
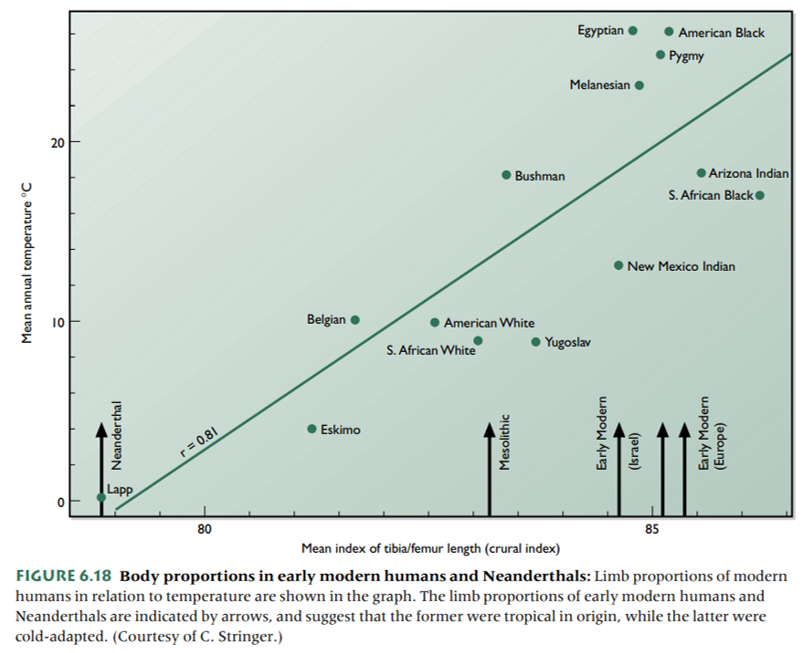
Body proportions of select modern human population groups in relation to temperature. Mean index of tibia/femur length (crural index).

Bergmann's rule states that endothermic animal subspecies living in colder climates have larger bodies than those of the subspecies living in warmer climates. Individuals with larger bodies are better suited for colder climates because larger bodies produce more heat due to having more cells, and have a smaller surface area to volume ratio compared to smaller individuals, which reduces the proportional heat loss. A study by Frederick Foster and Mark Collard found that Bergmann's rule can be applied to humans when the latitude and temperature between groups differ widely.

Allen's rule is a biological rule that says the limbs of endotherms are shorter in cold climates and longer in hot climates. Limb length affects the body's surface area, which helps with thermoregulation. Shorter limbs help to conserve heat, while longer limbs help to dissipate heat. Marshall T. Newman argues that this can be observed in Eskimo, who have shorter limbs than other people and are laterally built.

Paleoanthropologist John F. Hoffecker found that both Bermann's and Allen's biogeographical rules were confirmed, with it being seen that in modern populations, there is a clear trend of shorter distal limb segments in colder environments.

== Physiological adaptations ==
Origins of heat and cold adaptations can be explained by climatic adaptation. Ambient air temperature affects how much energy investment the human body must make. The temperature that requires the least amount of energy investment is 21 °C (70 °F). The body controls its temperature through the hypothalamus. Thermoreceptors in the skin send signals to the hypothalamus, which indicate when vasodilation and vasoconstriction should occur.

=== Cold ===
The human body has two methods of thermogenesis, which produces heat to maintain an elevated core body temperature. The first is shivering, which occurs in an unclothed person when the ambient air temperature is under 25 °C (77 °F). It may be limited by the amount of glycogen available in the body. The second is non-shivering, which occurs in brown adipose tissue and skeletal muscles.

Population studies have shown that the San tribe of Southern Africa and the Sandawe of Eastern Africa have reduced shivering thermogenesis in the cold, and poor cold-induced vasodilation in fingers and toes compared to that of Caucasians.

=== Heat ===
The only mechanism the human body has to cool itself is by sweat evaporation. Sweating occurs when the ambient air temperature is above 35 °C (95 °F) and the body fails to return to the normal internal temperature. The evaporation of the sweat helps cool the blood beneath the skin. It is limited by the amount of water available in the body, which can cause dehydration.

Humans adapted to heat early on. In Africa, the climate selected for traits that helped them stay cool. Also, humans had physiological mechanisms that reduced the rate of metabolism and that modified the sensitivity of sweat glands to provide an adequate amount for cooldown without the individual becoming dehydrated.

There are two types of heat the body is adapted to, humid heat and dry heat, but the body adapts to both in similar ways. Humid heat is characterized by warmer temperatures with a high amount of water vapor in the air, while dry heat is characterized by warmer temperatures with little to no vapor, such as desert conditions. With humid heat, the moisture in the air can prevent the evaporation of sweat. Regardless of acclimatization, humid heat poses a far greater threat than dry heat; the theoretical limit to human survival, even in the shade and with unlimited water, is a wet-bulb temperature exceeding 35 °C (95 °F) – theoretically equivalent to a heat index of 70 °C (158 °F). Dry heat, on the other hand, can cause dehydration, as sweat will tend to evaporate extremely quickly. Individuals with less fat and slightly lower body temperatures can more easily handle both humid and dry heat.

=== Acclimatization ===
When humans are exposed to certain climates for extended periods of time, physiological changes occur to help the individual adapt to hot or cold climates. This helps the body conserve energy.

==== Cold ====
The Inuit have more blood flowing into their extremities, and at a hotter temperature, than people living in warmer climates. A 1960 study on the Alacaluf Indians shows that they have a resting metabolic rate 150 to 200 percent higher than the white controls used. The Sami do not have an increase in metabolic rate when sleeping, unlike non-acclimated people. Aboriginal Australians undergo a similar process, where the body cools but the metabolic rate does not increase.

==== Heat ====
Humans and their evolutionary predecessors in Central Africa have been living in similar tropical climates for millions of years, which means that they have similar thermoregulatory systems.

A study done on the Bantus of South Africa showed that Bantus have a lower sweat rate than that of acclimated and nonacclimated white people. A similar study done on Aboriginal Australians produced similar results, with Indigenous Australians having a much lower sweat rate than Caucasians.

== Culture ==
Social adaptations enabled early modern humans to occupy environments with temperatures that were drastically different from that of Africa. (Potts 1998). Culture enabled humans to expand their range to areas that would otherwise be uninhabitable.

=== Cold ===
Humans have been able to occupy areas of extreme cold through clothing, buildings, and manipulation of fire. Furnaces have further enabled the occupation of cold environments.

Historically many Indigenous Australians wore only genital coverings. Studies have shown that the warmth from the fires they build is enough to keep the body from fighting heat loss through shivering. Inuit use well-insulated houses that are designed to transfer heat from an energy source to the living area, which means that the average indoor temperature for coastal Inuit is 10 to 20 °C (50 to 68 °F).

=== Heat ===
Humans inhabit hot climates, both dry and humid, and have done so for millions of years. Selective use of clothing and technological inventions such as air conditioning allows humans to live in hot climates.

One example is the Chaamba, who live in the Sahara Desert. They wear clothing that traps air in between skin and the clothes, preventing the high ambient air temperature from reaching the skin.

== See also ==
- Apparent temperature
- Recent human evolution
- Thermal comfort
