= Tamás Székely (biologist) =

Hungarian evolutionary biologist (born 1959)

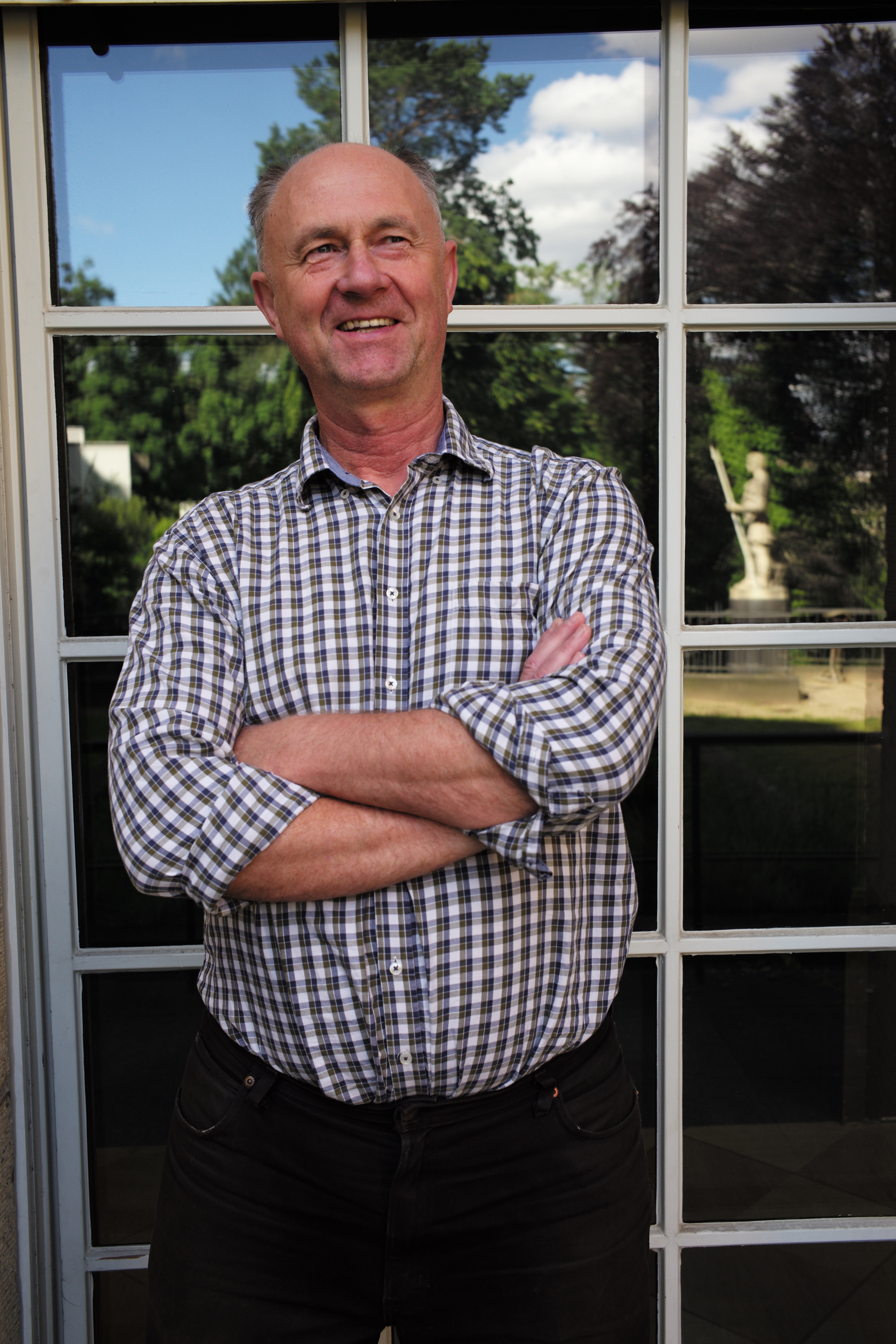
- Born: 24 May 1959 (age 67); Miskolc, Hungary
- Education: University of Debrecen (formerly Kossuth University)
- Known for: Demographic hypothesis of sex roles evolution
- Awards: Royal Society Wolfson Research Merit Award
- Scientific career
- Fields: Behavioral ecology, Evolutionary biology
- Workplaces: University of Debrecen; University of Bristol; University of Bath
- Thesis: Niche-structure of an oak-forest bird community (1986)
- Website: https://www.szekelylab.com/

Tamás Székely (born 24 May 1959) is a Hungarian evolutionary biologist and conservationist. He is the Professor of Biodiversity at the University of Bath and he holds an Honorary Professor position at the University of Debrecen, Hungary. He is also the Director of the Debrecen Biodiversity Centre. His 1999 article, Brood Desertion in Kentish Plover, examined sex differences in remating opportunities following brood desertion, demonstrating the social environment's influence on parental care dynamics.

His research focuses on Székely the demographic hypothesis regarding the origin of sex roles. In 2007, Székely co-edited Sex, Size & Gender Roles, confirming Darwin's conjectures that sexual selection is a major contributor to the overall pattern of male-biased size dimorphism in mammals, birds, and reptiles. Alongside others, he identified that the distribution of size differences between sexes in birds and mammals is leptokurtic. Székely co-edited Social Behaviour in 2010, offering an integrative perspective on studying behavioral complexity. Alongside Allen J. Moore and Jan Komdeur, he coined the term systems biology approach. Additionally, he founded the Maio Biodiversity Foundation in Cabo Verde in 2010.

== Education ==
In 1978, Tamás Székely commenced his studies at Kossuth University (now the University of Debrecen), Hungary, and successfully obtained a diploma in teaching biology and chemistry. From 1983 to 1986, he dedicated himself to his Ph.D. training at Kossuth University, concentrating on the temporal patterns of niche structure in forest passerine birds. The foundational conceptual framework he developed during these years was significantly shaped by Prof. Zoltán Varga's integrative research approach, emphasizing the critical importance of phylogeny in comprehending core patterns in ecology.

From 1987 to 1988, he spent a year as a postdoctoral research fellow at the Edward Grey Institute of Field Ornithology at Oxford, where he delved into the emerging topic of reproductive strategies within the nascent field of sociobiology (known as behavioral ecology in Europe).

== Work ==
=== Evolutionary Biology ===
Székely and his research team is recognized for describing the interactions of the components of sex roles in non-human animals: mate selection, parental care, and pair-bonding. His focus on shorebirds, including plovers, sandpipers, and related species, stems from the group's remarkable diversity in breeding systems, parenting behaviors, and sexual size dimorphism.

Using diverse methods including field studies, comparative analysis, and dynamic game theory modeling, he and his team has uncovered the influence of breeding systems, environmental conditions, and sexual dimorphism on courtship behaviors and sex biases.

His team also showed the crucial role of the social environment, particularly the adult sex ratio, in predicting parental cooperation across taxa. Their research also discovered formerly unknown adaptive parental care strategies that influence individual reproductive success, like the fact that incubating parent birds serve as visual cues to predators.

=== Conservation ===
Székely is renowned for both his theoretical and practical interventions in the conservation of shorebirds, water birds, and marine fauna, including sharks, whales, and sea turtles.

Through comparative analyses, Székely's team identified both extrinsic and intrinsic factors contributing to the decline in shorebird populations. They revealed a distinct pattern in the abundance trends of waterbirds, indicating a steeper decline at lower latitudes, particularly in the tropics, compared to higher latitudes. These contrasting responses suggested a potential global-scale poleward shift in species abundance due to climate change. Székely's team also demonstrated that climate change adversely affects northern latitudes by decreasing food resource availability and increasing predation rates. This work gained prominence for illustrating that ecosystems once considered safe for shorebirds are transforming into inhospitable environments.

In 2010, Székely founded the Maio Biodiversity Foundation (FMB, as per its Portuguese acronym) in Cabo Verde. The foundation's mission is to protect wildlife and natural habitats by actively engaging with local communities, with a focus on safeguarding sharks, whales, sea turtles, and various bird species. The conservation initiatives by FMB played a pivotal role in the designation of Salina Porto Ingles, one of Cape Verde's key shorebird breeding sites, as a Ramsar Site.

== Awards and recognition ==
=== Awards ===
- 2017 - Royal Society Wolfson Merit Award
- 2017 - Honorary Professor of Debrecen University
- 2019 - Honorary Plaquette of Kazincbarcika City (Hungary)
- 2019 - Foreign Member of Hungarian Academy of Sciences
- 2020 - Hungarian Order of Merit (Magyar Érdemrend Tisztikeresztje)
- 2023 - Medal of Merit awarded to Maio Biodiversity Foundation (FMB) by the President of Cabo Verde

=== Achievements ===
Throughout his career, Prof Székely's research has not only been recognised through awards, but his contributions to the field has improved our knowledge and understanding of the field of social behaviour. In 2010, Prof Szekely founded the FMB (Maio Biodiversity Foundation) conservation NGO in Cape Verde and lead the NGO as its president for 8 years. Prof Székely developed both a field methodology and research protocol for investigating shorebird social behaviour, which is now widely used around the globe [Szekely & Kosztolanyi 2006,. Through the use of this protocol, he analysed mathematically, experimentally and phylogenetically reproductive strategies. More recently, this has progressed into having developed a general framework for understanding the causes and consequences of adult sex ratio variation for social evolution. In addition, he identified sexual selection as a major driver of the Rensch's rule.

=== Media ===
In 2020, Prof Szekely was recognised for his work on social behaviour by being interviewed for the "Staff Spotlight" (https://www.bath.ac.uk/announcements/staff-spotlight-on-tamas-szekely/ ). In addition, Prof Szekely's research has been in numerous news articles, such as the BBC "Sex role reversal: Female shorebirds rule the roost" (https://www.bbc.co.uk/news/science-environment-21741912 ), Audubon "The Arctic is no longer a safe haven for breeding shorebirds" (an American magazine (https://www.audubon.org/news/the-arctic-no-longer-safe-haven-breeding-shorebirds), Science News "Climate change may have made the Arctic deadlier for baby shorebirds" (https://www.sciencenews.org/article/climate-change-may-have-made-arctic-deadlier-baby-shorebirds), Science Daily "Decline in shorebirds linked to climate change, experts warn" (https://www.sciencedaily.com/releases/2018/11/181108142405.htm) and EukekAlert! "Decline in shorebirds linked to climate change, experts warn" (https://www.eurekalert.org/news-releases/600065).

== Selected publications ==
=== Books ===
- Basic research planning, statistical and project evaluation methods in supra-individual biology (1995), co-editor.
- Sex, size and gender roles (2007), co-editor.
- Social behaviour: genes, ecology and evolution (2010), co-editor.

=== Journal articles ===
- Genetic similarity between mates explains extra-pair parentage in three species of waders (2002), in Nature, co-author.
- Sexual selection explains Rensch's rule of size dimorphism in shorebirds (2004), in PNAS, co-author.
- Conflict over parental care (2005), in Trends in Ecology and Evolution, co-author.
- The evolution of sex roles in birds is related to adult sex ratio (2013), in Nature Communications, co-author.
- Adult sex ratio variation: implications for breeding system evolution (2014), in Journal of Evolutionary Biology, co-author.
- The evolution of parental cooperation in birds (2015), in PNAS, co-author.
- The genetic sex-determination system predicts adult sex ratios in tetrapods (2015), in Nature, co-author.
- Global pattern of nest predation is disrupted by climate change in shorebirds (2018), in Science, co-author.
