= Climatic adaptation =

Organism response to some abiotic factors

Climatic adaptation refers to adaptations of an organism that are triggered due to the patterns of variation of abiotic factors that determine a specific climate. Annual means, seasonal variation and daily patterns of abiotic factors are properties of a climate where organisms can be adapted to. Changes in behavior, physical structure, internal mechanisms and metabolism are forms of adaptation that is caused by climate properties. Organisms of the same species that occur in different climates can be compared to determine which adaptations are due to climate and which are influenced majorly by other factors. Climatic adaptations limits to adaptations that have been established, characterizing species that live within the specific climate. It is different from climate change adaptations which refers to the ability to adapt to gradual changes of a climate. Once a climate has changed, the climate change adaptation that led to the survival of the specific organisms as a species can be seen as a climatic adaptation. Climatic adaptation is constrained by the genetic variability of the species in question.

== Climate patterns ==
The patterns of variation of abiotic factors determine a climate and thus climatic adaptation. There are many different climates around the world, each with its unique patterns. Because of this, the manner of climatic adaptation shows large differences between the climates. A subarctic climate, for instance, shows daylight time and temperature fluctuations as most important factors, while in rainforest climate, the most important factor is characterized by the stable high precipitation rate and high average temperature that doesn't fluctuate a lot. Humid continental climate is marked by seasonal temperature variances which commonly lead to seasonal climate adaptations. Because the variance of these abiotic factors differ depending on the type of climate, differences in the manner of climatic adaptation are expected.

== Research ==
Research on climatic adaptations are mostly aimed on species living in different climates to understand which of these species would have a higher chance to survive climate change, based on their current climatic adaptations. Climates with larger abiotic fluctuations tend to have species with a higher fluctuation tolerance, hence being able to adapt better to climate change. Other research questions involve the clarification of distinct differences between relatable species such as average size and behavioral patterns.

== Measuring Climatic Adaptation ==
Generally, the experimental measure of climate adaptation is conducted by exposing an experimental population to different environmental stimuli. Successful studies outside of a laboratory setting take place in locations with a variable annual climate. Areas where annual temperature and weather extremes vary greatly can give insight into the climate adaptability of organisms that live there. Tropical or arctic microclimates, for example, would be ideal settings for experimentation, as annual temperature and weather can vary greatly. Additionally, laboratory settings could work with certain creatures that have defense mechanisms for certain environmental changes, such as Drosophila's chill-coma adaptation.

The population's performance or behavior can then be plotted against the ecological-climatic factor being tested. High changes in individual behavior in response to a change in environment point to the conclusion that the population has high climate adaptability. Adaptation lag can occur when local populations perform significantly better than populations from other environments; however, this lag can be compensated for if the species in question has very high genetic diversity.

== Examples ==
Many species have varying levels of climatic adaptation. Differing average annual temperatures can have varying effects on a population's average body temperature, metabolic rate, or body size. But the actual effect of climatic adaptation depends greatly on the species in question and often the amount of genetic variability within that species.

- The bodies of some animals, such as woodrats, are inversely correlated with the mean annual temperature of their environment. This is an applied example of Bergmann's rule
- Drosophila species occur in both tropical climates, where the temperature is warm, and temperate climates, where the temperature is colder. When both groups of species are brought to a cold induced comatose state, the species of the tropical climates either way don't survive or recover significantly slower from the cold induced comatose state when brought back to room temperature compared to the species of the temperate Drosophila. The ability to recover fast from a cold induced comatose state indicates a climatic adaptation that can be referred to as chill-coma tolerance.
- Many arctic birds and mammals can change their heat dissipation and metabolic rate in response to changes in temperature, as different populations of the same species display different averages depending on their current climate.
- In arctic foxes (Alopex lagopus), starvation experiments indicate that the body mass in the arctic fox is regulated according to a seasonally changing set point and not by the availability of food. The basic metabolic rate varies seasonally being lower in winter than summer. The fur thickness can increase 140% from summer to winter.

== See also ==
- Adaptation to global warming, ways social and biological systems can respond to climate change to reduce their vulnerability to its effects
- Climate change (general concept)
- Global warming (recent warming)
- Evolution
- Evolutionary biology
- Melanism, in relation to “industrial melanism”
