= Lack's principle =

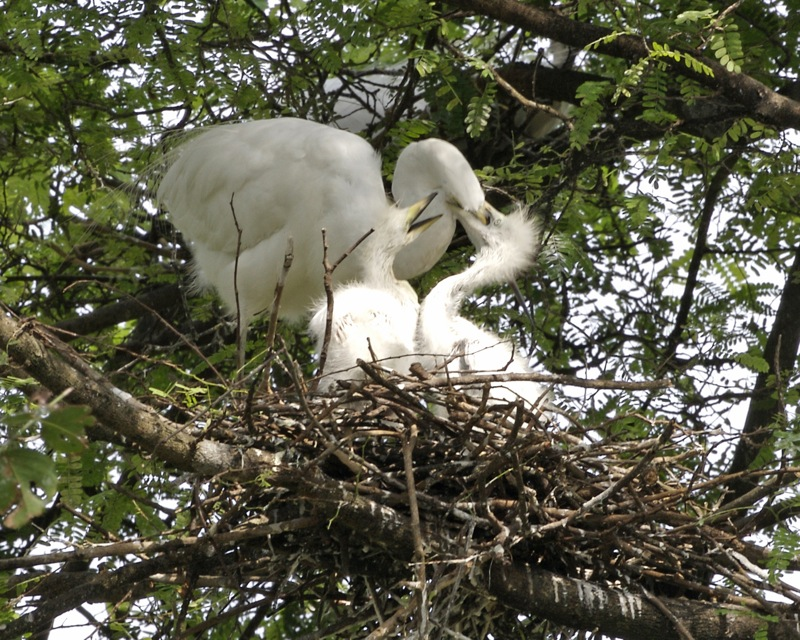
Birds lay only as many eggs as they will be able to provide for.

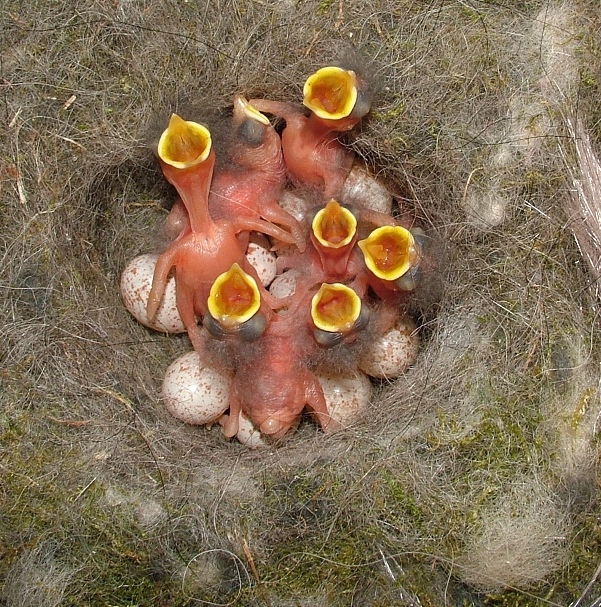
If there are too many mouths to feed, fewer young will survive, reducing the parents' reproductive fitness.

Lack's principle, proposed by the British ornithologist David Lack in 1954, states that "the clutch size of each species of bird has been adapted by natural selection to correspond with the largest number of young for which the parents can, on average, provide enough food". As a biological rule, the principle can be formalised and generalised to apply to reproducing organisms in general, including animals and plants. Work based on Lack's principle by George C. Williams and others has led to an improved mathematical understanding of population biology.

== Principle ==
Lack's principle implies that birds that happen to lay more eggs than the optimum will most likely have fewer fledglings (young that successfully fly from the nest) because the parent birds will be unable to collect enough food for them all. Evolutionary biologist George C. Williams notes that the argument applies also to organisms other than birds, both animals and plants, giving the example of the production of ovules by seed plants as an equivalent case. Williams formalised the argument to create a mathematical theory of evolutionary decision-making, based on the framework outlined in 1930 by R. A. Fisher, namely that the effort spent on reproduction must be worth the cost, compared to the long-term reproductive fitness of the individual. Williams noted that this would contribute to the discussion on whether (as Lack argued) an organism's reproductive processes are tuned to serve its own reproductive interest (natural selection), or as V.C. Wynne-Edwards proposed, to increase the chances of survival of the species to which the individual belonged (group selection). The zoologist J.L. Cloudsley-Thompson argued that a large bird would be able to produce more young than a small bird. Williams replied that this would be a bad reproductive strategy, as large birds have lower mortality and therefore a higher residual reproductive value over their whole lives (so taking a large short-term risk is unjustified). Williams' reply "is one of the most cited papers in life history evolution because it ... made it conceptually possible to find the optimal life history strategies in age-structured populations".

== See also ==
- Evolution
- Survival of the fittest
