= Biological rules =

Generalized principle to describe patterns observed in living organisms

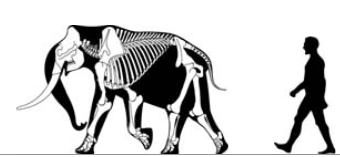
The pygmy mammoth is an example of insular dwarfism, a case of Foster's rule, its unusually small body size an adaptation to the limited resources of its island home.

A biological rule or biological law is a generalized law, principle, or rule of thumb formulated to describe patterns observed in living organisms. Biological rules and laws are often developed as succinct, broadly applicable ways to explain complex phenomena or salient observations about the ecology and biogeographical distributions of plant and animal species around the world, though they have been proposed for or extended to all types of organisms. Many of these regularities of ecology and biogeography are named after the biologists who first described them.

From the birth of their science, biologists have sought to explain apparent regularities in observational data. In his biology, Aristotle inferred rules governing differences between live-bearing tetrapods (in modern terms, terrestrial placental mammals). Among his rules were that brood size decreases with adult body mass, while lifespan increases with gestation period and with body mass, and fecundity decreases with lifespan. Thus, for example, elephants have smaller and fewer broods than mice, but longer lifespan and gestation. Rules like these concisely organized the sum of knowledge obtained by early scientific measurements of the natural world, and could be used as models to predict future observations. Among the earliest biological rules in modern times are those of Karl Ernst von Baer (from 1828 onwards) on embryonic development (see von Baer's laws), and of Constantin Wilhelm Lambert Gloger on animal pigmentation, in 1833 (see Gloger's rule). There is some scepticism among biogeographers about the usefulness of general rules. For example, J.C. Briggs, in his 1987 book Biogeography and Plate Tectonics, comments that while Willi Hennig's rules on cladistics "have generally been helpful", his progression rule is "suspect".

== List of biological rules ==
Bergmann's rule states that body mass increases with colder climate, as here in Swedish moose.

- Allen's rule states that the body shapes and proportions of endotherms vary by climatic temperature by either minimizing exposed surface area to minimize heat loss in cold climates or maximizing exposed surface area to maximize heat loss in hot climates. It is named after Joel Asaph Allen who described it in 1877.
- Bateson's rule states that extra legs are mirror-symmetric with their neighbours, such as when an extra leg appears in an insect's leg socket. It is named after the pioneering geneticist William Bateson who observed it in 1894. It appears to be caused by the leaking of positional signals across the limb-limb interface, so that the extra limb's polarity is reversed.
- Bergmann's rule states that within a broadly distributed taxonomic clade, populations and species of larger size are found in colder environments, and species of smaller size are found in warmer regions. It applies with exceptions to many mammals and birds. It was named after Carl Bergmann who described it in 1847.
- Bogert's Rule (also known as Thermal Melanin Hypothesis) states that many animals with darker-pigments evolved in colder regions, while animals with lighter-pigments evolved in hotter regions. It can conflict with Gloger's Rule.
- Cope's rule states that animal population lineages tend to increase in body size over evolutionary time. The rule is named for the palaeontologist Edward Drinker Cope.
- Deep-sea gigantism, noted in 1880 by Henry Nottidge Moseley, states that deep-sea animals are larger than their shallow-water counterparts. In the case of marine crustaceans, it has been proposed that the increase in size with depth occurs for the same reason as the increase in size with latitude (Bergmann's rule): both trends involve increasing size with decreasing temperature.

Dollo's law of irreversibility asserts that once an organism has evolved in a certain way, it will not return exactly to a previous form.

- Dollo's law of irreversibility, proposed in 1893 by French-born Belgian paleontologist Louis Dollo states that "an organism never returns exactly to a former state, even if it finds itself placed in conditions of existence identical to those in which it has previously lived ... it always keeps some trace of the intermediate stages through which it has passed."
- Eichler's rule states that the taxonomic diversity of parasites co-varies with the diversity of their hosts. It was observed in 1942 by Wolfdietrich Eichler, and is named for him.
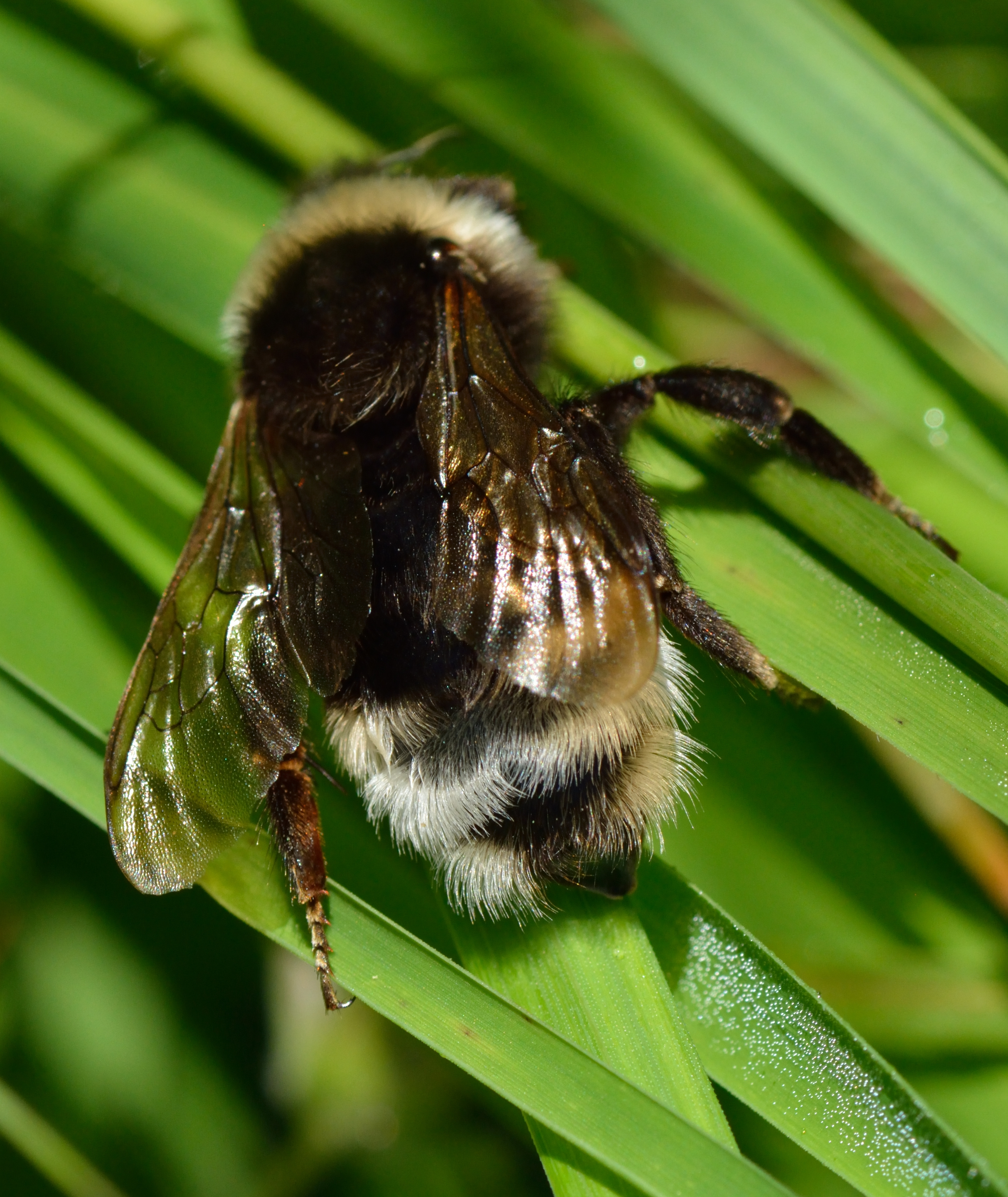
  Emery's rule states that insect social parasites like cuckoo bumblebees choose closely related hosts, in this case other bumblebees.
- Emery's rule, noticed by Carlo Emery, states that insect social parasites are often closely related to their hosts, such as being in the same genus.
- Foster's rule, the island rule, or the island effect states that members of a species get smaller or bigger depending on the resources available in the environment. The rule was first stated by J. Bristol Foster in 1964 in the journal Nature, in an article titled "The evolution of mammals on islands".
- Gause's law or the competitive exclusion principle, named for Georgy Gause, states that two species competing for the same resource cannot coexist at constant population values. The competition leads either to the extinction of the weaker competitor or to an evolutionary or behavioral shift toward a different ecological niche.
- Gloger's rule states that within a species of endotherms, more heavily pigmented forms tend to be found in more humid environments, e.g. near the equator. It was named after the zoologist Constantin Wilhelm Lambert Gloger, who described it in 1833.
- Haldane's rule states that if in a species hybrid only one sex is sterile, that sex is usually the heterogametic sex. The heterogametic sex is the one with two different sex chromosomes; in mammals, this is the male, with XY chromosomes. It is named after J.B.S. Haldane.
- Hamilton's rule states that genes should increase in frequency when the relatedness of a recipient to an actor, multiplied by the benefit to the recipient, exceeds the reproductive cost to the actor. This is a prediction from the theory of kin selection formulated by W. D. Hamilton.
- Harrison's rule states that parasite body sizes co-vary with those of their hosts. He proposed the rule for lice, but later authors have shown that it works equally well for many other groups of parasite including barnacles, nematodes, fleas, flies, mites, and ticks, and for the analogous case of small herbivores on large plants.
- Hennig's progression rule states that when considering a group of species in cladistics, the species with the most primitive characters are found within the earliest part of the area, which will be the center of origin of that group. It is named for Willi Hennig, who devised the rule.
- Jordan's rule states that there is an inverse relationship between water temperature and meristic characteristics such as the number of fin rays, vertebrae, or scale numbers, which are seen to increase with decreasing temperature. It is named after the father of American ichthyology, David Starr Jordan.
- Kleiber's law states that the metabolic rate of animals and plants scales to 3/4ths the power of their mass. This is named for Max Kleiber, who observed it first in animals in 1932.
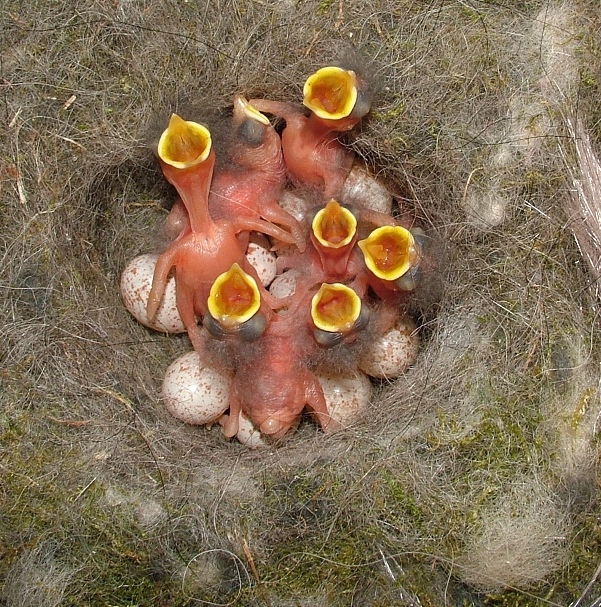
  Lack's principle matches clutch size to the largest number of young the parents can feed
- Lack's principle, proposed by David Lack, states that "the clutch size of each species of bird has been adapted by natural selection to correspond with the largest number of young for which the parents can, on average, provide enough food".
- Rapoport's rule states that the latitudinal ranges of plants and animals are generally smaller at lower latitudes than at higher latitudes. It was named after Eduardo H. Rapoport by G. C. Stevens in 1989.
- Rensch's rule states that, across animal species within a lineage, sexual size dimorphism increases with body size when the male is the larger sex, and decreases as body size increases when the female is the larger sex. The rule applies in primates, pinnipeds (seals), and even-toed ungulates (such as cattle and deer). It is named after Bernhard Rensch, who proposed it in 1950.
- Schmalhausen's law, named after Ivan Schmalhausen, states that a population at the extreme limit of its tolerance in any one aspect is more vulnerable to small differences in any other aspect. Therefore, the variance of data is not simply noise interfering with the detection of so-called "main effects", but also an indicator of stressful conditions leading to greater vulnerability.
- Thorson's rule states that benthic marine invertebrates at low latitudes tend to produce large numbers of eggs developing to pelagic (often planktotrophic [plankton-feeding]) and widely dispersing larvae, whereas at high latitudes such organisms tend to produce fewer and larger lecithotrophic (yolk-feeding) eggs and larger offspring, often by viviparity or ovoviviparity, which are often brooded. It was named after Gunnar Thorson by S. A. Mileikovsky in 1971.
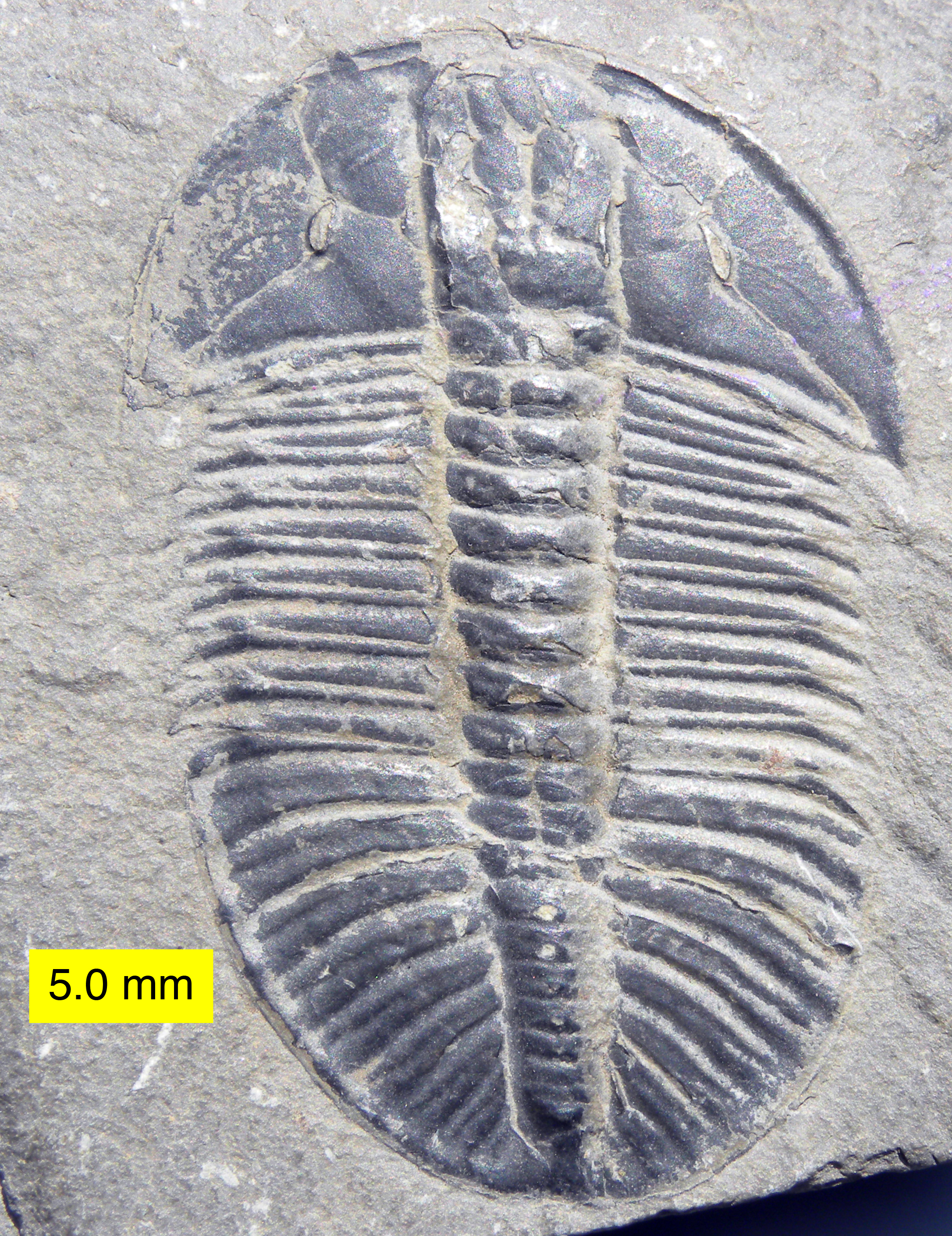
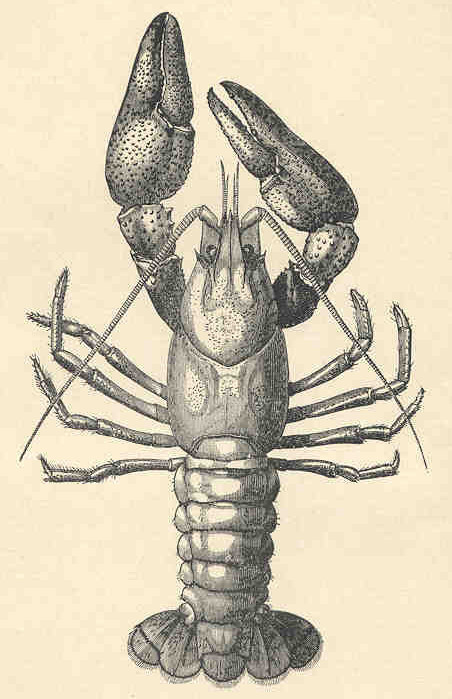
  Williston's law states that in lineages such as the arthropods, limbs tend to become fewer and more specialised, as shown by the crayfish (right), whereas the more basal trilobites had many similar legs.
- Van Valen's law states that the probability of extinction for species and higher taxa (such as families and orders) is constant for each group over time; groups grow neither more resistant nor more vulnerable to extinction, however old their lineage is. It is named for the evolutionary biologist Leigh Van Valen.
- von Baer's laws, discovered by Karl Ernst von Baer, state that embryos start from a common form and develop into increasingly specialised forms, so that the diversification of embryonic form mirrors the taxonomic and phylogenetic tree. Therefore, all animals in a phylum share a similar early embryo; animals in smaller taxa (classes, orders, families, genera, species) share later and later embryonic stages. This was in sharp contrast to the recapitulation theory of Johann Friedrich Meckel (and later of Ernst Haeckel), which claimed that embryos went through stages resembling adult organisms from successive stages of the scala naturae from supposedly lowest to highest levels of organisation.
- Williston's law, first noticed by Samuel Wendell Williston, states that parts in an organism tend to become reduced in number and greatly specialized in function. He had studied the dentition of vertebrates, and noted that where ancient animals had mouths with differing kinds of teeth, modern carnivores had incisors and canines specialized for tearing and cutting flesh, while modern herbivores had large molars specialized for grinding tough plant materials.

== See also ==
- Aristotle's biology
