= Advances in Parasitology =

- Language: English

Publication details
- History: 1963-present
- Publisher: Academic Press

Standard abbreviations
- ISO 4: Adv. Parasitol.

Indexing
- CODEN: ADPRAD
- ISSN: 0065-308X
- OCLC no.: 01325467

Advances in Parasitology is a book series of reviews addressing topics in parasitology, for both human and veterinary medicine. First published as an annual volume in 1963, the book is now released quarterly. It is currently published by Elsevier and is abstracted and indexed in MEDLINE.
