= Gloger's rule =

Ecogeographical rule for endotherms

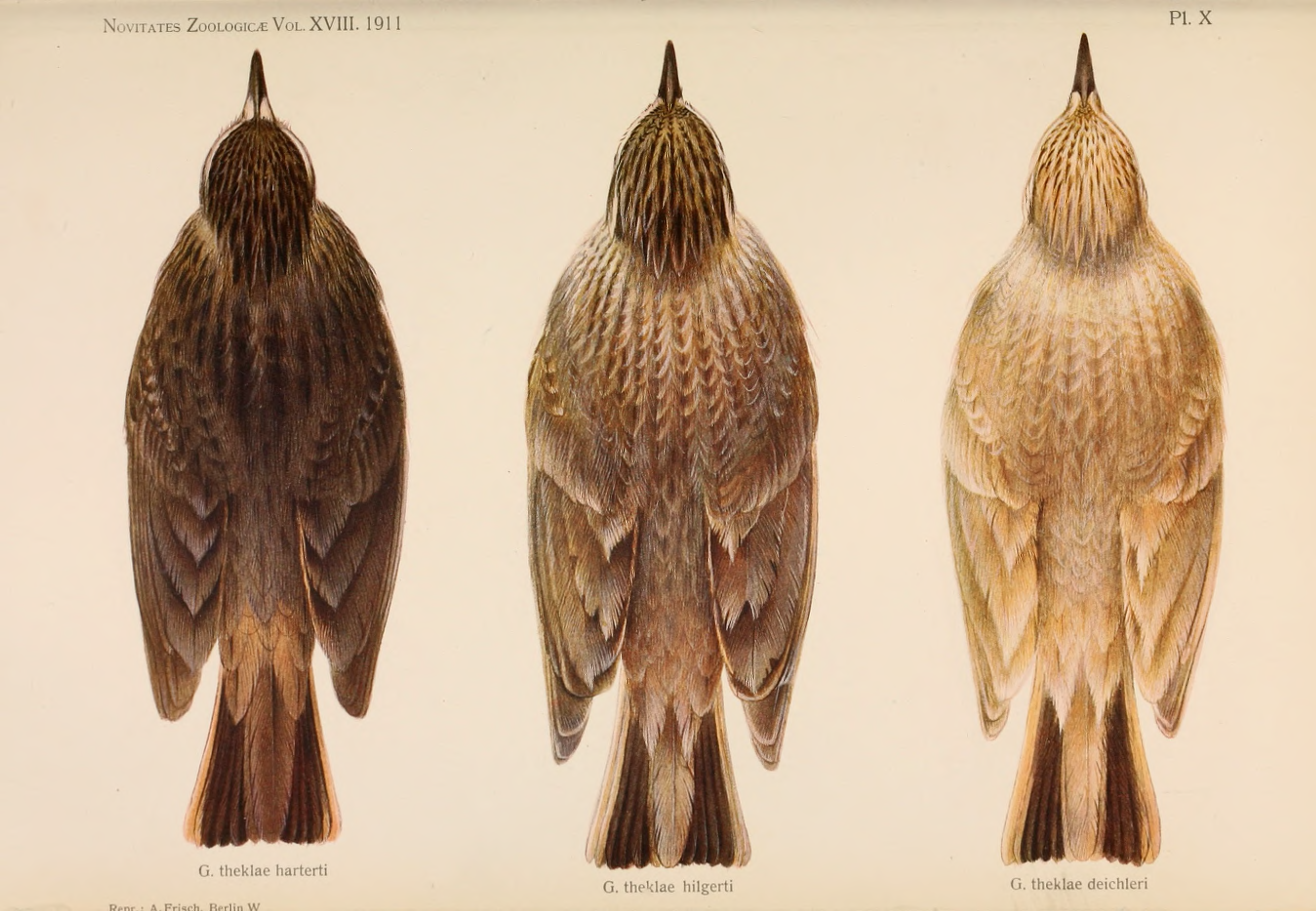
The Algerian subspecies of Thekla's Lark (Galerida theklae) demonstrate Gloger's Rule. Left to right: G.t."harterti" (=ruficolor) from the warm and humid coastal plains G.t."hilgerti" (=superflua) from the colder and drier Atlas Mountains G.t."deichleri" (=carolinae) from the hot and very dry Sahara desert

Gloger's rule is an ecogeographical rule which states that within a species of endotherms, more heavily pigmented forms tend to be found in more humid environments, e.g. near the equator. It was named after the zoologist Constantin Wilhelm Lambert Gloger, who first remarked upon this phenomenon in 1833 in a review of covariation of climate and avian plumage color. Erwin Stresemann later noted that the idea had been expressed even earlier by Peter Simon Pallas in Zoographia Rosso-Asiatica (1811). Gloger found that birds in more humid habitats tended to be darker than their relatives from regions with higher aridity. Over 90% of 52 North American bird species studied conform to this rule.

One explanation of Gloger's rule in the case of birds appears to be the increased resistance of dark feathers to feather- or hair-degrading bacteria such as Bacillus licheniformis. Feathers in humid environments have a greater bacterial load, and humid environments are more suitable for microbial growth; dark feathers or hair are more difficult to break down. More resilient eumelanins (dark brown to black) are deposited in hot and humid regions, whereas in arid regions, pheomelanins (reddish to sandy color) predominate due to the benefit of crypsis.

Gloger's rule concerns coloration visible to humans. However, about 55% of solar energy is in the near-infrared. A study found that northern bobwhite populations whose back plumage was equally dark in visible light absorbed different shares of sunlight across the ultraviolet-to-near-infrared range, with birds from Iowa, the coolest of the three areas sampled, absorbing the most.

Among mammals, there is a marked tendency in equatorial and tropical regions to have a darker skin color than poleward relatives. In this case, the underlying cause is probably the need to better protect against the more intense solar UV radiation at lower latitudes. However, absorption of a certain amount of UV radiation is necessary for the production of certain vitamins, notably vitamin D (see also osteomalacia).

Gloger's rule is also found among human populations. Populations that evolved in sunnier environments closer to the equator tend to be darker-pigmented than populations originating farther from the equator. There are exceptions, however; among the most well known are the Tibetans and Inuit, who have darker skin than might be expected from their native latitudes. In the first case, this is apparently an adaptation to the extremely high UV radiation on the Tibetan Plateau, whereas in the second case, the necessity to absorb UV radiation is alleviated by the Inuit's diet, which is naturally rich in vitamin D, and the year-round snow and ice, which effectively reflects UV into the environment.

== See also ==
- Allen's rule
- Bergmann's rule – correlating latitude with body mass in animals

== Sources ==
- Burtt, Edward H. Jr.; Ichida, Jann M. (2004). "Gloger's Rule, feather-degrading bacteria, and color variation among Song Sparrows" (PDF). The Condor. 106 (3): 681–686. doi:10.1650/7383. ISSN 0010-5422. S2CID 5857742. Archived (PDF) from the original on 2012-11-20.
- Ember, Carol R.; Ember, Melvin; Peregrine, Peter N. (2002). Anthropology (10th ed.). Prentice Hall. ISBN 978-0-13-091836-9. LCCN 2001033927. OCLC 47018472.
- Gloger, Constantin Wilhelm Lambert (1833). "§. 5. Abänderungsweise der einzelnen, einer Veränderung durch das Klima unterworfenen Farben". Das Abändern der Vögel durch Einfluss des Klimas [The Evolution of Birds Through the Impact of Climate] (in German). Breslau: August Schulz. pp. 11–24. ISBN 978-3-8364-2744-9. OCLC 166097356.
- Stresemann, Erwin (August 1975). Cottrell, G. William (ed.). Ornithology: from Aristotle to the present. Translated by Epstein, Hans J.; Epstein, Cathleen. Cambridge, MA: Harvard University Press. p. 70. ISBN 978-0-674-64485-4. LCCN 74025035. OCLC 1499768.
- Zink, Robert M.; Remsen, James V. Jr. (1986). "Evolutionary Processes and Patterns of Geographic Variation in Birds". In Johnston, Richard F. (ed.). Current Ornithology. Vol. 4. New York, NY: Plenum Press. pp. 1–69. ISBN 0-306-42352-9.
