= Isolation by distance =

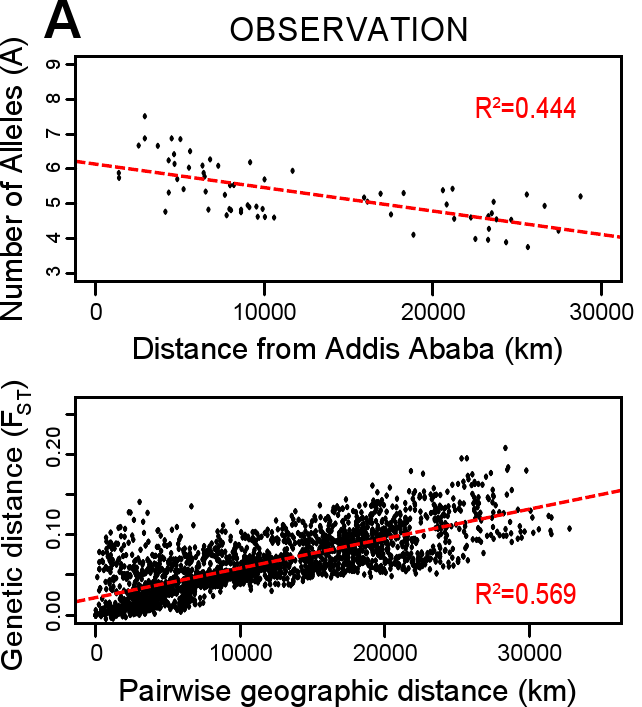
The patterns of isolation by distance as shown among human genetic data representing 346 microsatellite loci taken from 1484 individuals in 78 human populations. The horizontal axis of both charts is geographic distance as measured along likely routes of human migration. The upper graph illustrates that as populations are further from East Africa (represented by the city of Addis Ababa), they have declining genetic diversity as measured in average number of microsatellite repeats at each of the loci. The bottom chart measures the genetic distance between all pairs of populations according to the Fst statistic. Populations separated by greater distance are more dissimilar than those that are geographically close.

Isolation by distance (IBD) is a term used to refer to the accrual of local genetic variation under geographically limited dispersal. The IBD model is useful for determining the distribution of gene frequencies over a geographic region. Both dispersal variance and migration probabilities are variables in this model and both contribute to local genetic differentiation. Isolation by distance is usually the simplest model for the cause of genetic isolation between populations. Evolutionary biologists and population geneticists have been exploring varying theories and models for explaining population structure. Yoichi Ishida compares two important theories of isolation by distance and clarifies the relationship between the two. According to Ishida, Sewall Wright's isolation by distance theory is termed ecological isolation by distance while Gustave Malécot's theory is called genetic isolation by distance. Isolation by distance is distantly related to speciation. Multiple types of isolating barriers, namely prezygotic isolating barriers, including isolation by distance, are considered the key factor in keeping populations apart, limiting gene flow.

== Sewall Wright- Ecological Isolation By Distance ==
Wright introduced two different models of population structure, one not taking short-distance dispersal into account and one model incorporating short-distance dispersal. The "island model" is quite artificial and proposes the idea that a population is divided into two geographically, unique subpopulations (islands) with random mating occurring with exchange of individuals occurring when a migrant is drawn randomly from the total population. In a more realistic model, where short-distance dispersal is taken into account, a population is compiled of continuously distributed individuals over a region of space. Populations in remote locations may become differentiated simply by isolation by distance, restricting the probability of individuals mating with one another. Local populations are small in comparison to the total population and reproduction occurs solely within the local population. This ecological isolation by distance, according to Wright, can create genetic differentiation among subpopulations, leading to evolutionary change. Individuals within the subpopulation are neighbors in the sense that their gametes may come together and inbreeding within the subpopulation increases homozygosity. Wright's statistical theory for isolation by distance looks at population genetic consequences measured by F-statistics where the correlation of randomly uniting gametes within a subpopulation relative to those of the total population is the FST value.

$F_{ST}=\frac{Var(q_{ST})}{q_{T}(1-q_{T})}$

The equation takes into account the variance in the distribution (var), the allele frequency within the total population (q_{T}), and the allele frequency within the subpopulation (q_{ST}). Neighborhood size affects the local genetic differentiation (F_{ST}). Higher F_{ST} values indicate greater local genetic differentiation

== Gustave Malécot- Genetic Isolation By Distance ==
Malécot's theory refers to a population genetic pattern where genetic differentiation among individuals increases as geographical distances increases. Dispersal is normally localized in space, lending to the expectation that individuals from closer subpopulations will be more genetically similar. Malécot argues that neighborhood size is not important because a decrease in the kinship coefficient does not depend on neighborhood size. This probabilistic theory solely depends on distances between that of offspring and their parents. A population, at equilibrium, displays genetic isolation by distance with stochastic processes producing genetic isolation. This genetic isolation by distance theory involves concepts of gametic kinship chains, identity by descent, and migration probabilities. The kinship coefficient (φ) is the probability that two homologous loci are identical by descent.

$\frac{\varphi(r)}{\varphi(0)}=e^{-r\frac{\sqrt{2k}}{\sigma}}$

The equation takes into account distance (r), mutation rate (k), and the standard deviation of migration (σ). The kinship coefficient decreases as a function of distance and if a mutation occurs in either locus or if the gamete kinship chain is zero, the kinship coefficient will be zero. Yoichi Ishida interprets alteration in neighborhood size as alteration in dispersal variance linking both Wright's statistical theory and Malécot's probabilistic theory explaining why they both invite similar conclusions. Alteration in neighborhood size is alteration in dispersal variance and alteration corresponds to alteration in the variance of the probability of distribution associated with migration probabilities. Both dispersal variance and migration probabilities contribute to local genetic differentiation.

== Alternate Models to Isolation by Distance ==
Both adaptive and nonadaptive processes play a part, individually or acting together, and create variation in populations and species. Understanding the roles of both processes has been a central goal in biology. As previously described, gradual genetic drift across populations (isolation by distance) and limited gene dispersal can account for some of the genetic and phenotypic divergence across populations, but there are alternative models besides isolation by distance that can contribute to these differences as well. Two of these alternate models include isolation by colonization and isolation by adaptation. The former is a product of colonization history and founder effects while the latter is a product of adaption to varying environments inhibiting migration between populations. A recent scientific article (Spurgin et al., 2014) tried to differentiate between these processes by utilizing island populations of Anthus berthelotii (Berthelot's pipit) native to three Atlantic archipelagos. Microsatellite markers and approximate Bayesian computation revealed that the northward colonization of the species produced genetic bottlenecks. High levels of genetic structure occurring across the archipelagos indicate an isolation by colonization pattern. Significant morphological divergence was present that is highly consistent with trends of bottleneck and genetic structure history, not with geographic distance or environmental variation.

== Applications in Genetic/Evolutionary Research ==
Understanding genetic and phenotypic divergence across populations of varying species is important in elucidating ecological and evolutionary differences among populations. One such study where genetic structure among human individuals is investigated is by Relethford and Brennan, (1982) where pedigree and marriage data from Sanday, Orkney Islands in Scotland were used to evaluate temporal patterns in isolation by distance. The data considered were for three time periods, 1855-1884, 1885-1924, and 1925-1964. These time periods were categorized by birth year for married males. Average inbreeding coefficient of all potential spouses (chosen within the known demographic and genealogical limits of the population's structure) of each married male was calculated to determine random kinship values. Over time, the isolation by distance model reveals a decline in local isolation and a rise in short and long range migration and the Sandy population experienced an isolate breakdown over time. Distance plays a role in determining kinship, but becomes less significant over time as the measures of the fit of the model decline. Overall inbreeding decreased and mean marital distance increased. Additionally consanguinity avoidance occurred over all distances, but avoidance was more prominent at closer distances.

The genetic structure, dynamics, and evolution of populations and species are also important from an ecological point of view when considering the probability of colonization and extinction. One of the key processes influencing these dynamics is dispersal. When localized, populations that are geographically closer are expected to exchange more migrants and should tend to share neutral genetic markers. One such study investigated the direct and indirect measures of dispersal in Branchipodopsis wolfi (fairy shrimp), located in spatially fragmented, ephemeral rock pools located in southeastern Botswana. Dispersal trends and rates were compared by using both spatial genetic structure and direct measures of dispersal. A total of 29 populations from three spatially different rock pools were subjected to allozyme analysis for four loci to access genetic variation and estimates of gene flow between populations were generated using population genetic software. Direct measures of dispersal were determined by quantifying the number of viable floating dormant eggs and larvae that circulated intro overflow traps during flooding events. Genetic differentiation among sites was highly significant (with neighboring sites being more similar). FST ratios for all populations increased with geographical distance in all three rock pool sites, indicating a small-scale isolation-by-distance pattern. Research shows that a distance of 50 meters is an important constraint on the effective dispersal and gene flow for fairy shrimp. Isolation by distance also occurs as a result of competition between species: spatial segregation may be due to the negative impact of a species' activity on another one.

== See also ==
- Reproductive isolation
