= Rensch's rule =

Biological rule concerning sexual size dimorphism

Rensch's rule is a biological rule on allometrics, concerning the relationship between the extent of sexual size dimorphism and which sex is larger. Across species within a lineage, size dimorphism increases with increasing body size when the male is the larger sex, and decreases with increasing average body size when the female is the larger sex. The rule was proposed by the evolutionary biologist Bernhard Rensch in 1950.

After controlling for confounding factors such as evolutionary history, an increase in average body size makes the difference in body size larger if the species has larger males, and smaller if it has larger females. Some studies propose that this is due to sexual bimaturism, which causes male traits to diverge faster and develop for a longer period of time. The correlation between sexual size dimorphism and body size is hypothesized to be a result of an increase in male-male competition in larger species, a result of limited environmental resources, fuelling aggression between males over access to breeding territories and mating partners.

Phylogenetic lineages that appear to follow this rule include primates, pinnipeds, and artiodactyls.

This rule has rarely been tested on parasites. A 2019 study showed that ectoparasitic philopterid and menoponid lice comply with it, while ricinid lice exhibit a reversed pattern.
