= Carl Bergmann (anatomist) =

German biologist (1814–1865)

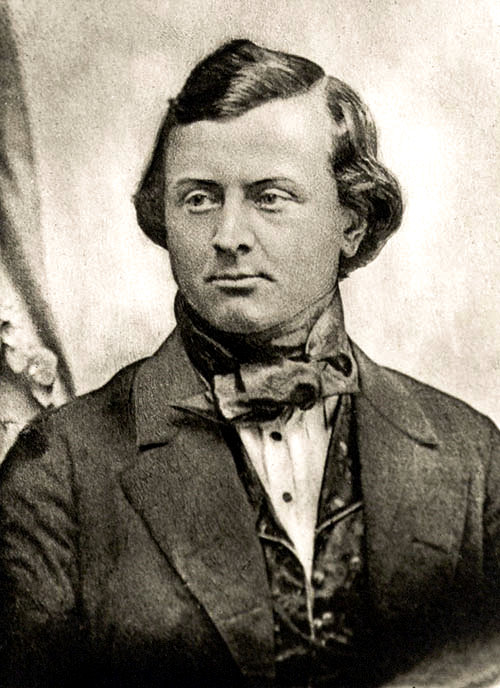
- Born: Karl Georg Lucas Christian Bergmann; 18 May 1814; Göttingen, Electorate of Hanover
- Died: 30 April 1865 (aged 50); Geneva
- Education: University of Göttingen
- Known for: "Bergmann's rule"
- Scientific career
- Fields: Anatomy, physiology
- Thesis: De placentae foetalis resorptione (On the resorption of the fetal placenta) (1838)

Carl Georg Lucas Christian Bergmann (18 May 1814 – 30 April 1865), also known as Karl Georg Lucas Christian Bergmann, was a German anatomist, physiologist, and biologist. He developed Bergmann's rule (that populations and species of animals of larger size are found in colder environments). He microscopically examined the cells of the retina to determine which of them convert light into neural signals that lead ultimately to visual perception: the cones and the rods. Bergmann also coined the terms fovea centralis (for the very center of the retina), homoiothermic (referring to warm-blooded animals), and poikilothermic (referring to non-homoiothermic animals).

== Biography ==
Bergmann was born in Göttingen, then in the Electorate of Hanover. His father was Friedrich Christian Bergmann (1785–1845), a lawyer and professor. His mother was Henriette Christine, née Mejer. After graduating from high school in Holzminden in 1832, he studied medicine and natural sciences at the universities in Göttingen and Würzburg.

In 1838, Bergmann received his medical doctorate at the University of Göttingen, with a dissertation entitled "De placentae foetalis resorptione" (On the resorption of the fetal placenta).

In 1839, Bergmann obtained his habilitation at the University of Göttingen. He worked as a private lecturer at the university in medicine for physiology, comparative anatomy, and forensic medicine.

From 1840 Bergmann was assistant to Rudolf Wagner for the university's comparative anatomical collection. In 1843 he was appointed associate professor at Göttingen University.

In 1847 Bergmann published the work on the relationships between the heat economy of animals and their size. This regular connection between heat balance and body size in animals was named after him - Bergmann's rule.

From October 1852 Bergmann became a full professor of anatomy and physiology at the University of Rostock and a member of Rostock's Medicinal Commission. In 1861 he was appointed Obermedicinalrath (Senior Medical Officer). From 1858–1859, Bergmann was rector of Rostock University.

In 1859, Bergmann was elected as a member of the Göttingen Academy of Sciences. In 1864, he was elected as a member of the Leopoldina Academy of Scholars.

Carl Bergmann was married to Wilhelmine Bergmann, née Heusinger von Waldegge.

Bergmann died in Geneva on 30 April 1865, following his return from Menton, where he had resided for the winter because of his deteriorating health.

== Research ==
=== Neuroscience ===
Prior to the 1850s, most scientists believed that vision begins in the retinal ganglion cells. However in 1854, Bergmann argued that rods and cones must be the retinal cells responsible for converting light into vision. This was because he found that these were the only cells of the fovea centralis, all the others having been pulled out of the path of light to the retina. Bergmann said:

The fovea centralis, located in the middle of the most acute part of the retina, is, of course, not a blind spot. Rather, as an unusually constructed part located here, it can be assumed to be particularly advantageous. In fact, it is only those retinal elements present here that can be assumed to be percipient.

Later in the same year Heinrich Müller arrived at the same conclusion from careful measurement of moving shadows of the retinal blood vessels, using the principal of motion parallax.

== Publications ==
- Bergmann, C. (1846). Lehrbuch der Medicina Forensis für Juristen. Friedrich Vieweg und Sohn, Braunschweig
- Bergmann, C. (1848). Über die Verhältnisse der Wärmeökonomie der Thiere zu ihrer Grösse . Vandenhoeck und Ruprecht, Göttingen.
- Bergmann, C. and R. Leuckart (1855). Anatomisch-physiologische Uebersicht des Thierreichs. Vergleichende Anatomie und Physiologie. J. B. Müller, Stuttgart.
- Bergmann, C. (1854). "Zur Kenntnis des gelben Flecks der Netzhaut." Zeitschrift fur rationelle Medicin 3(1): 245-252.
- Bergmann, C. (1857). "Anatomisches und Physiologisches über die Netzhaut des Auges." Zeitschrift fur rationelle Medicin 3(1): 83-108.
