= Allen's rule =

Relation of habitat temperature and limb length

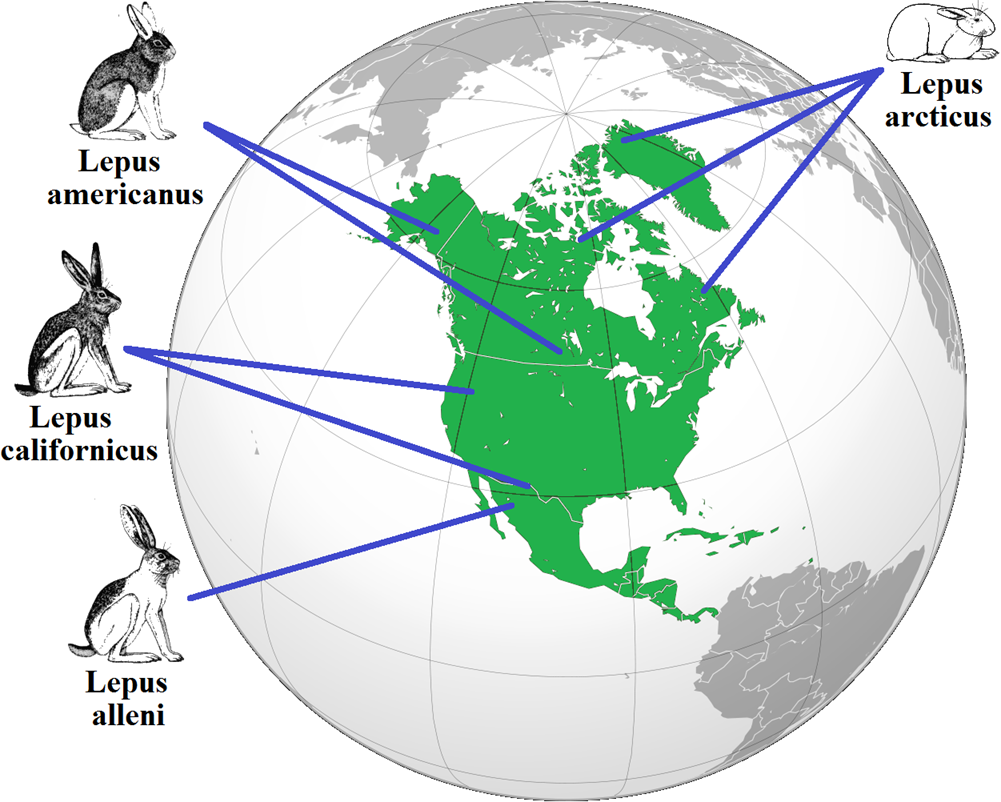
The Arctic hare's ears are shorter than the ears of many rabbits in warmer climates.

Allen's rule is an ecogeographical rule formulated by Joel Asaph Allen in 1877, broadly stating that animals adapted to cold climates have shorter and thicker limbs and bodily appendages than animals adapted to warm climates. More specifically, it states that the body surface-area-to-volume ratio for homeothermic animals varies with the average temperature of the habitat to which they are adapted (i.e. the ratio is low in cold climates and high in hot climates).

== Explanation ==
Three rectangular prisms are each composed of eight unit cubes. A composite cube with a side of 2 has a volume of 8 units^{3} but a surface area of only 24 units^{2}. A rectangular prism three cubes wide, one cube long and four cubes tall has the same volume, but a surface area of 28 units^{2}. Stacking them in a single column gives 34 units^{2}.

Allen's rule predicts that endothermic animals with the same body volume should have different surface areas that will either aid or impede their heat dissipation.

Because animals living in cold climates need to conserve as much heat as possible, Allen's rule predicts that they should have evolved comparatively low surface area-to-volume ratios to minimize the surface area by which they dissipate heat, allowing them to retain more heat. For animals living in warm climates, Allen's rule predicts the opposite: that they should have comparatively high ratios of surface area to volume. Because animals with low surface area-to-volume ratios would overheat quickly, animals in warm climates should, according to the rule, have high surface area-to-volume ratios to maximize the surface area through which they dissipate heat.

Graphs of surface area, A against volume, V of the Platonic solids and a sphere, showing that rounder shapes with the same volume have a smaller surface area.

== In animals ==
Though there are numerous exceptions, many animal populations appear to conform to the predictions of Allen's rule. The polar bear has stocky limbs and very short ears that are in accordance with the predictions of Allen's rule, so does the snow leopard. In 2007, R.L. Nudds and S.A. Oswald studied the exposed lengths of seabirds' legs and found that the exposed leg lengths were negatively correlated with Tmaxdiff (body temperature minus minimum ambient temperature), supporting the predictions of Allen's rule. J.S. Alho and colleagues argued that tibia and femur lengths are highest in populations of the common frog that are indigenous to the middle latitudes, consistent with the predictions of Allen's rule for ectothermic organisms. Populations of the same species from different latitudes may also follow Allen's rule.

R.L. Nudds and S.A. Oswald argued in 2007 that there is poor empirical support for Allen's rule, even if it is an "established ecological tenet". They said that the support for Allen's rule mainly draws from studies of single species, since studies of multiple species are "confounded" by the scaling effects of Bergmann's rule and alternative adaptations that counter the predictions of Allen's rule.

J.S. Alho and colleagues argued in 2011 that, although Allen's rule was originally formulated for endotherms, it can also be applied to ectotherms, which derive body temperature from the environment. In their view, ectotherms with lower surface area-to-volume ratios would heat up and cool down more slowly, and this resistance to temperature change might be adaptive in "thermally heterogeneous environments". Alho said that there has been a renewed interest in Allen's rule due to global warming and the "microevolutionary changes" that are predicted by the rule.

== In humans ==
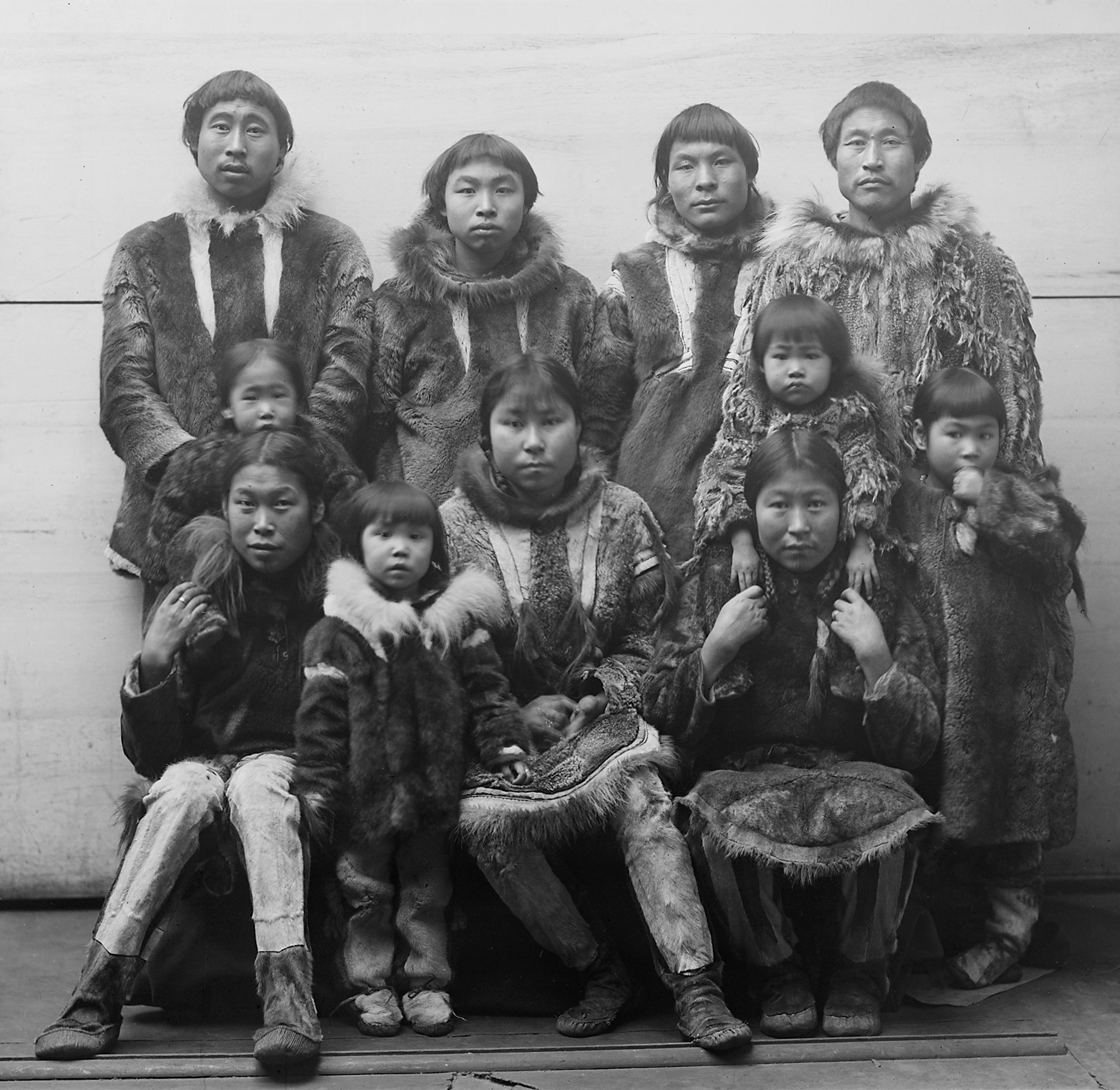
Eskimo Group by photographer William Dinwiddie (1894)

Marked differences in limb lengths have been observed when different portions of a given human population reside at different altitudes. Environments at higher altitudes generally experience lower ambient temperatures. In Peru, individuals who lived at higher elevations tended to have shorter limbs, whereas those from the same population who inhabited the more low-lying coastal areas generally had longer limbs and larger trunks.

Katzmarzyk and Leonard similarly noted that human populations appear to follow the predictions of Allen's rule.^{:494} There is a negative association between body mass index and mean annual temperature for indigenous human populations,^{:490} meaning that people who originate from colder regions have a heavier build for their height and people who originate from warmer regions have a lighter build for their height. Relative sitting height is also negatively correlated with temperature for indigenous human populations,^{:487–88} meaning that people who originate from colder regions have proportionally shorter legs for their height and people who originate from warmer regions have proportionally longer legs for their height.

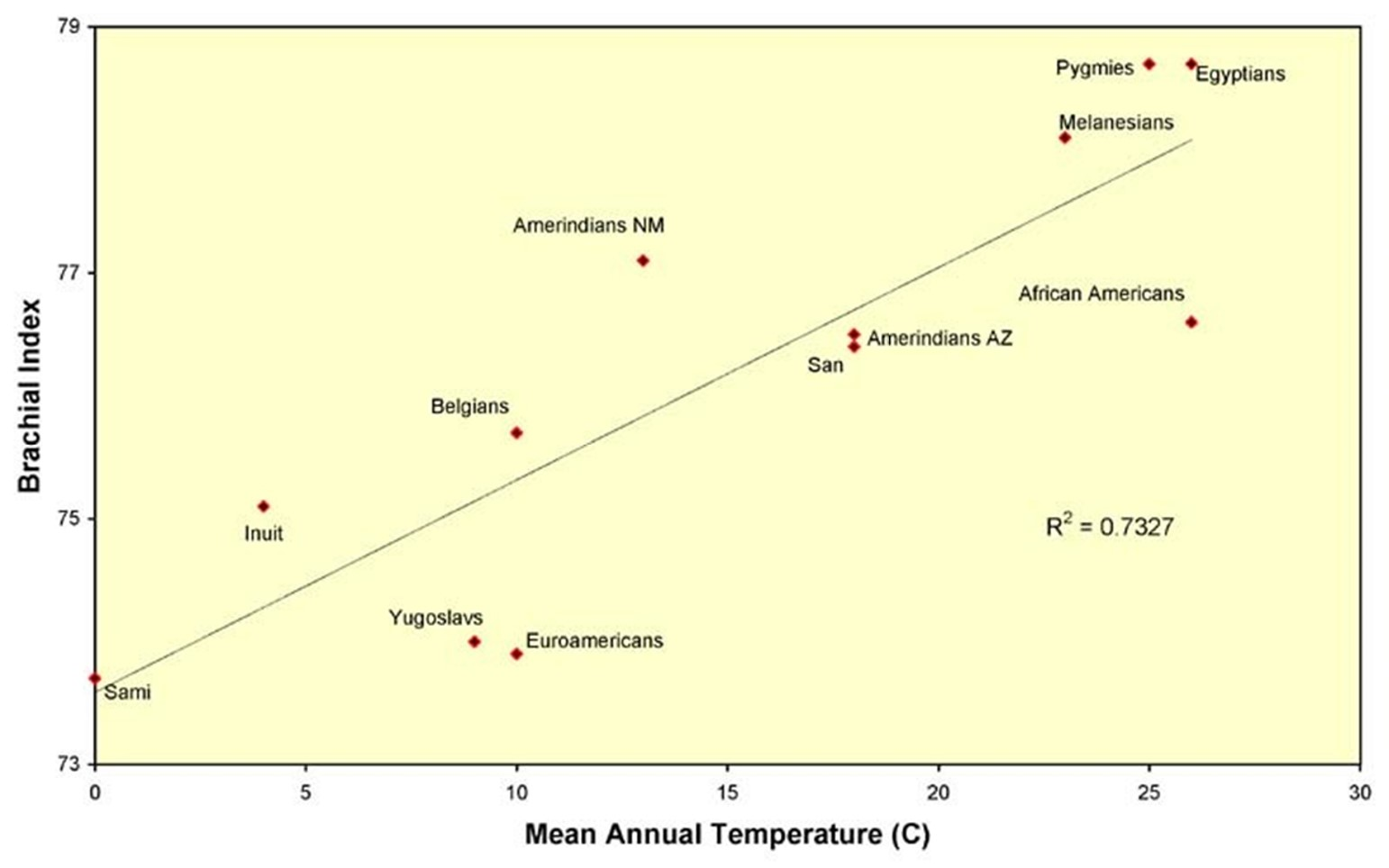
Mean annual temperature and limb proportions in selected modern populations.

In 1968, A.T. Steegman investigated the assumption that Allen's rule caused the structural configuration of the face of human populations adapted to polar climate. Steegman did an experiment that involved the survival of rats in the cold. Steegman said that the rats with narrow nasal passages, broader faces, shorter tails and shorter legs survived the best in the cold. Steegman said that the experimental results had similarities with the Arctic Mongoloids, particularly the Eskimo and Aleut, because these have similar morphological features in accordance with Allen's rule: a narrow nasal passage, relatively large heads, long to round heads, large jaws, relatively large bodies, and short limbs.

Allen's rule may have also resulted in wide noses and alveolar and/or maxillary prognathism being more common in human populations in warmer regions, and the opposite in colder regions.

== Mechanism ==
A contributing factor to Allen's rule in vertebrates may be that the growth of cartilage is at least partly dependent on temperature. Temperature can directly affect the growth of cartilage, providing a proximate biological explanation for this rule. Experimenters raised mice either at 7 degrees, 21 degrees or 27 degrees Celsius and then measured their tails and ears. They found that the tails and ears were significantly shorter in the mice raised in the cold in comparison to the mice raised at warmer temperatures, even though their overall body weights were the same. They also found that the mice raised in the cold had less blood flow in their extremities. When they tried growing bone samples at different temperatures, the researchers found that the samples grown in warmer temperatures had significantly more growth of cartilage than those grown in colder temperatures.

== See also ==
- Bergmann's rule, which correlates latitude with body mass in animals
- Gloger's rule, which correlates humidity with pigmentation in animals
- Cold and heat adaptations in humans
- List of eponymous laws
