= C. L. Gloger =

German zoologist and ornithologist (1803–1863)

Constantin Wilhelm Lambert Gloger
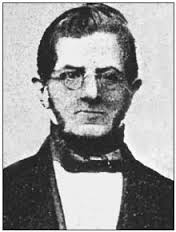
- Born: 17 September 1803; Grottkau, Silesia
- Died: 30 December 1863 (aged 60)
- Citizenship: Kingdom of Prussia
- Known for: Gloger's rule
- Scientific career
- Fields: Zoology, ornithology

Constantin Wilhelm Lambert Gloger (17 September 1803 near Grottkau, Silesia, Kingdom of Prussia – 30 December 1863 in Berlin) was a German zoologist and ornithologist.

Gloger was the first person to recognise the structural differences between swallows and swifts, and also the first to put up artificial bat boxes.

He was the originator of what is now known as Gloger's rule, which states that dark pigments increase in races of animals (birds were the examples in which he originally noticed the pattern) living in warm and humid habitats. He put forward this theory in his Das Abändern der Vögel durch Einfluss des Klimas (1833). The exact way this pattern is actually caused is still unclear, but in birds it has been suggested that darker pigmented plumage provides protection against feather-degrading bacteria, whose activity is greater in warm and humid regions. His other works include Gemeinnütziges Hand- und Hilfsbuch der Naturgeschichte (1841).
