= Nutkao =

Italian food manufacturing company

Nutkao S.r.l.
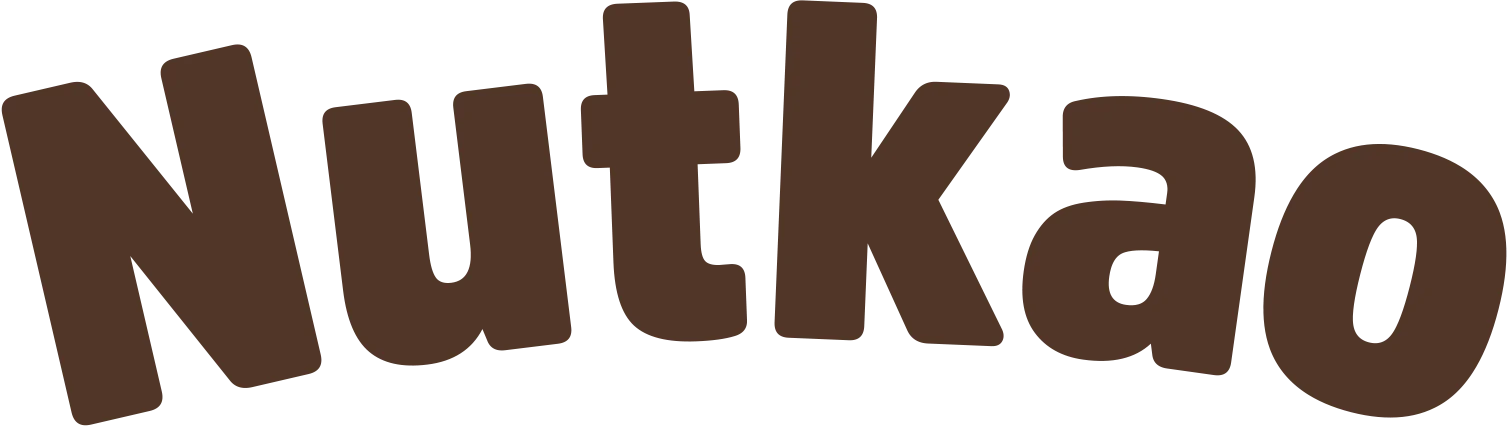
- Industry: Food
- Founded: 1982
- Founder: Giuseppe Braida
- Headquarters: Italy
- Products: Cocoa and milk spreadable cream
- Owner: Al Mada
- Number of employees: 160
- Website: nutkao.com

Nutkao is an Italian food company that specializes in the production of cocoa and milk spreadable creams. Together with Novi and Valsoia, it is a leader in the Italian market of sweet spreads, following only behind Ferrero (which produces Nutella).

== History ==
The company was founded in 1982 by the current CEO, Giuseppe Braida, a former employee of Ferrero. In 2001, Nutkao relocated from Piobesi d'Alba to Govone, both located in the province of Cuneo.

In 2010, the Consilium Group acquired a majority stake in Nutkao. At that time, Nutkao’s primary markets were Italy and France, but the company also exported its products to other regions within and outside of Europe, including the United States, South America, Australia, the Middle East, China, and North Africa.

In June 2014, Nutkao announced plans to open a facility in Battleboro, North Carolina, United States, with around forty employees.

In 2018, the production center in Accra, Ghana was opened, where exclusively first-choice Ghanaian cocoa beans are processed.

In 2020, Nutkao further expanded its market by acquiring Boerrineke, a Belgian brand known for its chocolate spreadable creams.

== See also ==
- Cacao
- Nudossi
- Nocilla
