= Chocolate spread =

Sweet chocolate-flavored paste

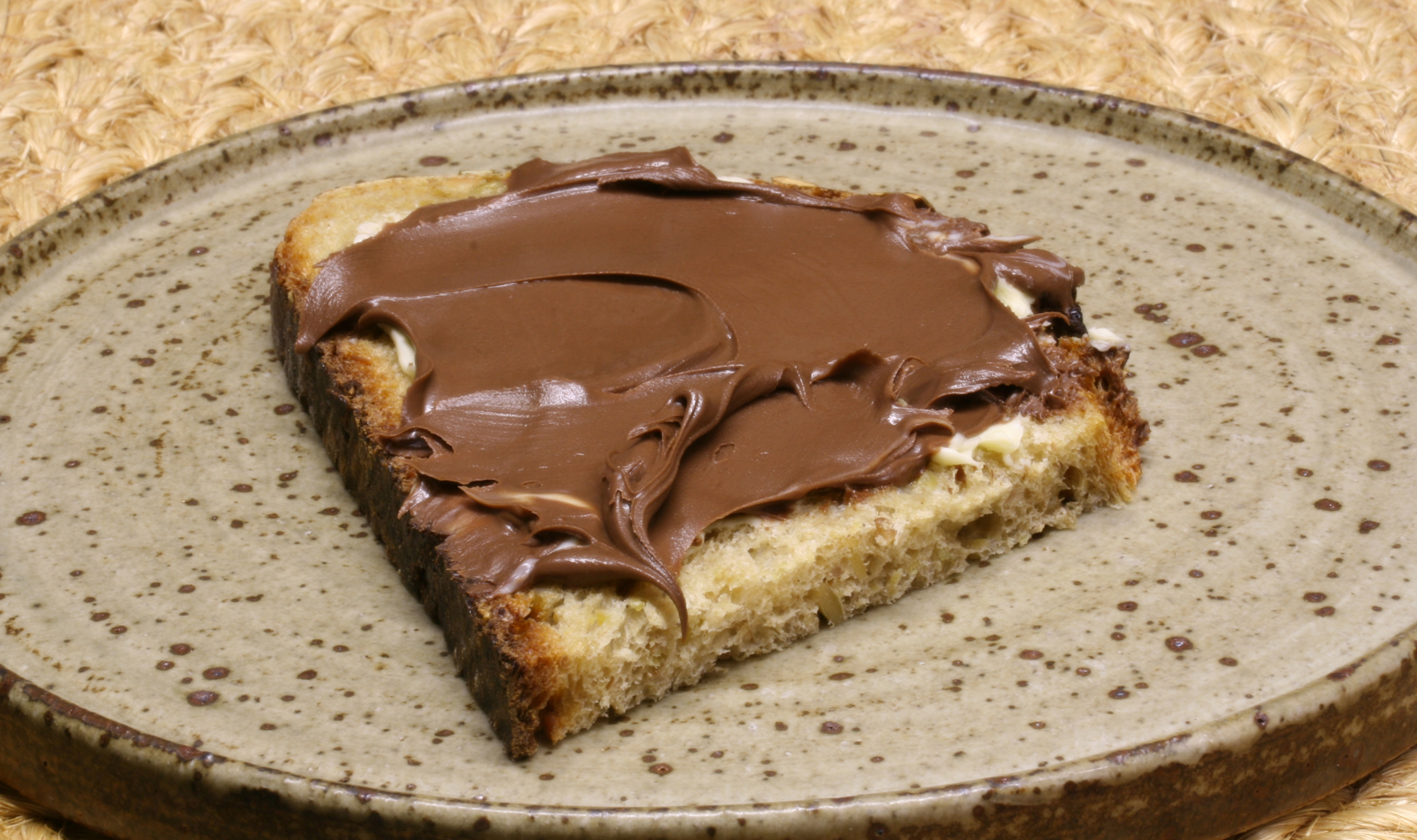
- Chocolate spread on a slice of bread
- Type: Spread
- Main ingredients: Cocoa or chocolate, oil, milk, sugar
- Variations: Use of hazelnut

Chocolate spread is a sweet chocolate-flavored paste. It looks, tastes and smells very similarly to chocolate does. It is made from cocoa beans and an oil (vegetable oil), milk, sugar and additional flavors. Some varieties include nuts (e.g., ground hazelnuts) or honey.

Chocolate spread brands are manufactured mostly in Italy, along with other popular brands that are manufactured in Canada and the United States. The most popular brand of chocolate spread in the world being Nutella, manufactured first in Italy.

== The History Of Chocolate Spread ==
The history of chocolate spread is closely connected to Gianduja, a traditional chocolate hazelnut sweet associated with Turin, Italy. Although its exact origins are debated, the chocolate hazelnut sweets became popular in the region during the 19th century. In 1946, Italian pastry chef Pietro Ferrero created a thick paste using hazelnuts, sugar, and a small amount of cocoa, which was difficult to obtain during World War II. In 1951, Ferrero introduced a spreadable version called La Super Crema, making chocolate hazelnut spread more affordable and accessible to Italian households. The recipe was later modified in 1961 to include palm oil, allowing for larger-scale production, and the product was renamed Nutella.

== Factory Production Of Chocolate Spread ==

In terms of factory production, chocolate spread is made through a series of complex, labour-intensive processes that transform raw cocoa beans into a smooth, finished product. The process begins with the selection of high-quality cocoa beans, which are then roasted to develop their flavour and remove excess moisture. Once roasted, the beans are cracked and passed through winnowing machines, which separate the outer shells from the cocoa nibs. The nibs are then ground into chocolate liquor, a thick, smooth paste. Additional ingredients, such as sugar, milk powder, vegetable oils, and hazelnuts, are then added to create the desired flavour and consistency. The mixture is transferred to a conching machine, where it is continuously mixed and heated to refine its texture and develop its flavour. Depending on the desired consistency, this process can take anywhere from several hours to several days.

Once the chocolate spread has reached the desired consistency, it is gradually cooled to prepare it for packaging. It is then transferred into filling machines, which portion the spread into jars or containers before they are sealed, labelled, and prepared for sale. Throughout production, quality control checks are carried out to ensure that the spread meets food safety standards and maintains a consistent taste, texture, and quality. Finally, the packaged products are boxed, transported to distribution centres, and delivered to supermarkets and other retailers, where they are made available to consumers.

== Healthy Alternatives to Chocolate Spread ==
Palm fat is the main fatty ingredient found in chocolate spread, and brands have begun to substitute it with other ingredients due to the rising popularity in healthy foods. The moisture of chocolate spread comes from the oil in it, and the spread’s hardness increases with lower oil percentage which impacts its spreadability. Chocolate spread is commonly consumed as a breakfast food in the United Kingdom and is often used as an alternative to traditional marmalade, particularly among families with children who prefer sweeter spreads. Many commercially produced chocolate spreads contain palm oil, which is high in saturated fat. High consumption of saturated fats has been associated with an increased risk of cardiovascular disease in recent decades. In response to nutritional concerns, alternative chocolate spread products and homemade recipes have gained attention. Some recipes and products use reduced amounts of sugar and substitute ingredients such as dark chocolate and olive oil for conventional ingredients. Other chocolate spread alternatives use nuts such as macadamias and walnuts instead of palm oil. These alternatives may offer nutritional benefits because nuts contain unsaturated fats, which can help lower LDL cholesterol and reduce the risk of cardiovascular disease when used to replace saturated fats.

== Environmental Impact - Palm Oil ==
Palm tree plantation that replaced a natural forest

Palm oil is an ingredient that many chocolate spreads contain, and the expansion of palm oil cultivation has been linked to deforestation in tropical regions, including Indonesia, Malaysia, Papua New Guinea, and parts of Brazil. Palm oil is a widely used vegetable oil in food manufacturing, and its production has led to forest plans becoming palm tree plantations in some areas. The extent of this impact varies by region, producer, and sourcing practices. Some manufacturers have adopted certification schemes, such as the Roundtable on Sustainable Palm Oil (RSPO), intended to limit deforestation in their supply chains.

=== Notable brands ===
- Nutella – Italian
- Lino Lada – Croatian
- Nudossi – German
- Nugatti – Norwegian
- Nugeta – Czechoslovakia/Czech Republic
- Nocilla – Spanish
- Eurocrem – Serbian
- Toastaria – Thailand
- Kwatta – Belgium
- Ovomaltine - Switzerland

== Ingredients ==
- Sugarcane Syrup
- Cacao
- Sunflower seed oil
- Milk
- Sugar
- Hazelnut

== Nutritional information ==
Chocolate-flavored hazelnut spread
Nutritional value per 100 g (3.5 oz)
- Energy: 2,262 kJ (541 kcal)
- Carbohydrates: 62.16 g
- Fat: 29.73 g
- Saturated: 28.423 g
- Protein: 5.41 g
Vitamins and minerals
Vitamins	Quantity %DV^{†}
Vitamin E	33% 4.96 mg
- ^{†}Percentages estimated using US recommendations for adults.

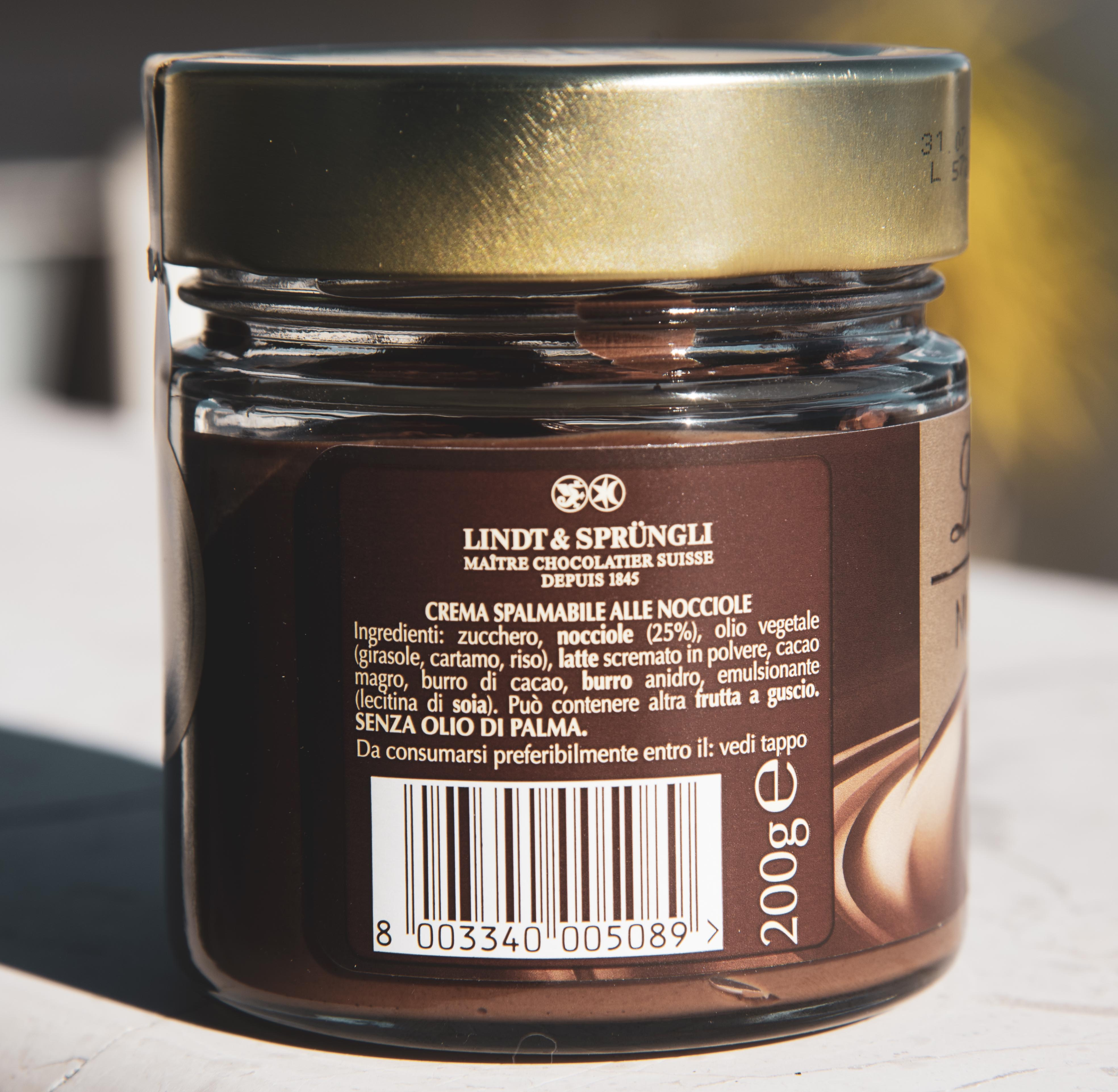
Ingredients used in a chocolate-flavored hazelnut spread. Note the variety of oils and fats used, and the mention "palm oil free".

== See also ==
- List of spreads
- Hazelnut butter
