= Francesco Rivella =

Italian chemist (1927–2025)

- Rivella in 2024
- Born: 8 August 1927; Barbaresco, Piedmont, Italy
- Died: 14 February 2025 (aged 97); Alba, Piedmont, Italy
- Occupations: Chemist; chocolatier
- Children: 4

Francesco Rivella (8 August 1927 – 14 February 2025) was an Italian chocolatier and chemist known for his work with the expansion of the Ferrero brand, including the creation of the chocolate spread Nutella and the development of its recipe.

== Life and career ==
Rivella was born in Barbaresco, Piedmont, Italy, on 8 August 1927. Having just received a degree in bromatological chemistry from Turin, Rivella began to work alongside the businessman Michele Ferrero as Ferrero's right hand man to produce chocolate beginning at the age of 25 in 1952, having joined the Ferrero company as a chocolatier. The original form of Nutella, first sold in 1951, was a creamy version of gianduja called Supercrema gianduja, based on Ferrero's father Pietro's solid chocolate Pasta Gianduja. In 1964, Ferrero recruited Rivella for them to work together on developing a revamped version of Supercrema gianduja, with the aim of selling it across Italy and Europe. Rivella was credited with coming up with the name "Nutella" in 1964, having reportedly perfected the taste with Ferrero after having spent several years with him travelling the world to come up with newer flavours.

Rivella and Ferrero traveled around the world to sample confectionery products with a belief that they could refine and improve those products. Rivella contributed to the development of Kinder and Ferrero Rocher products. According to Gigi Padovani, his balance of tradition and innovation made Rivella a key person in the Ferrero company's rise as a multinational company.

Following his career at Ferrero, Rivella served as a member of the Order of Chemists. After retiring, he dedicated his spare time to fruit farming and the traditional Italian sport of Pallapugno. Rivella died in Alba, Piedmont, on 14 February 2025, at the age of 97. Prior to his death, Rivella was widowed with three sons, a daughter, and seven grandchildren.
