= Eurocrem =

Brand of chocolate spread

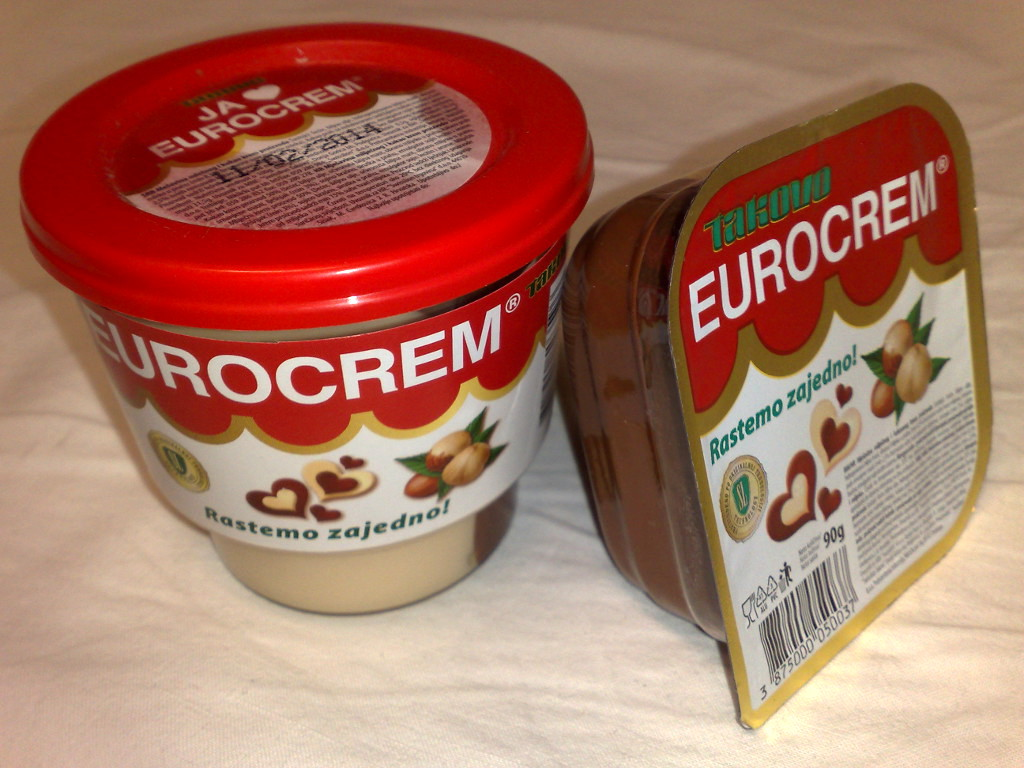
- Retail Eurocrem packages: 200 g (7.1 oz) on the left, and 90 g (3.2 oz) on the right
- Type: Spread
- Course: Sweet Treat and/or Gourmet Dessert Ingredient
- Place of origin: Serbia (then Yugoslavia)
- Region or state: Gornji Milanovac
- Created by: A. Gandola & C. S.p.A.
- Invented: 1970
- Main ingredients: Hazelnuts, milk, sugar

Eurocrem (a shorthand for Eurocrem Takovo) is a brand of two-colored (brown and white) hazelnut- and cocoa-flavored sweet milk chocolate spread, produced by a Swisslion Group factory in Gornji Milanovac, Serbia, about 120 kilometres (75 miles) south of Belgrade.

It was the most popular product of its kind across SFR Yugoslavia, when they decided to stop producing it under the licence of A. Gandola & C. Spa. It has nothing to do with introduction of international brands such as Italian Nutella and German Nudossi. Additionally, it used to be accompanied by an image of a slice of bread covered with Eurocrem, one half of the slice covered with brown (cocoa-flavored) Eurocrem, and another half covered with white Eurocrem (hazelnut-flavored).

== History ==
The trademark Eurocrem was registered with the World Intellectual Property Organisation (WIPO) on 3 August 1967 by the Italian company A. Gandola & C. Spa, receiving registration number 336733. A. Gandola & C. Spa licensed the Eurocrem brand in 1972 to Takovo, a food and drinks manufacturer based in Gornji Milanovac, which is now part of Swisslion Group. Takovo was one of the largest industrial companies of the former SFR Yugoslavia. A. Gandola & C. Spa still produces the original Eurocrem chocolate spread.

On 15 September 2008, Swisslion Group registered the Takovo Eurocrem trademark with the WIPO, receiving registration number 993249. According to local media reports in November 2011, Swisslion Group produces 12.000 tonnes (13.228 tons) of Takovo Eurocrem annually; half of that amount is exported to the United States, Western European countries, and countries of the former SFR Yugoslavia.

Licensed Eurocrem is available in only one flavor combination, hazelnut and cocoa.

There's a few variants and sizes of Eurocrem, including Eurocrem Blok, a form of Eurocrem in the style of a chocolate bar, as well as sizes up to 2-lb. buckets.

Eurocrem has been marketed under various slogans, including "for the growing generation", "we grow together" and "there's only one", with the latter used recently as of February 2018.

== Packages ==
Numerous package types and sizes are manufactured, ranging from 15 g (0.53 oz) to 5 kg (11 lb) containers. Various packaging materials are used, depending on package sizes and their targeting at retail or bulk consumers – including foil packs, plastic or glass bowls and jars, and plastic buckets. Swisslion Group also manufactures a bar version of Eurocrem called Euro Blok.

== See also ==
- Swisslion Group
- List of bean-to-bar chocolate manufacturers
- List of spreads
