= Pietro Ferrero Jr. =

Italian businessman (1963–2011)

- Born: 11 September 1963; Farigliano, Italy
- Died: 18 April 2011 (aged 47); Cape Town, South Africa
- Occupation: Businessman
- Known for: CEO of Ferrero SpA (1997–2011)
- Father: Michele Ferrero
- Relatives: Pietro Ferrero (grandfather); Giovanni Ferrero (brother)

Pietro Ferrero Jr. (Italian pronunciation: [ˈpjɛːtro ferˈrɛːro]; 11 September 1963 – 18 April 2011) was the joint CEO (with his brother Giovanni) of Italian confectionery company Ferrero SpA, from 1997 until his death in April 2011.

== Biography ==
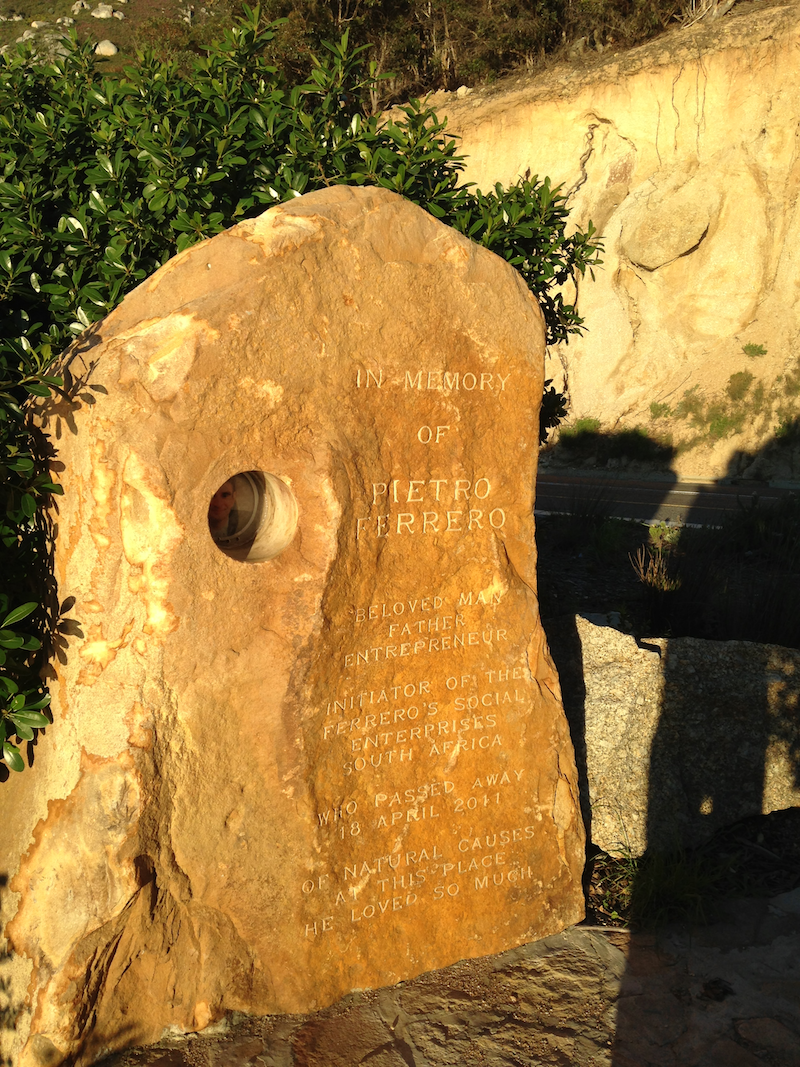
Pietro Ferrero Jr (1963–2011) memorial at the Pietro Ferrero lookout point in Cape Town

Ferrero was born in Turin, the elder son of Michele Ferrero, who raised the firm to its position as a global leader. In 1985, he began working for Ferrero, and in 1992 had risen to be in charge of European operations. He became one of the company's two CEOs in 1997, along with his brother Giovanni.

On 18 April 2011, Pietro Ferrero died in South Africa near Twelve Apostles Hotel in Camps Bay, suburb of Cape Town after suffering a heart attack while on a cycling track.
