= Govone =

- Comune
- Comune di Govone
- Location within Italy Location within Piedmont
- Coordinates: 44°48′N 8°6′E
- Country: Italy
- Region: Piedmont
- Province: Province of Cuneo (CN)

Area
  - Total: 18.8 km^{2} (7.3 sq mi)
- Elevation: 301 m (988 ft)

Population (Dec. 2019)
  - Total: 2,132
  - Density: 113/km^{2} (294/sq mi)
- Demonym: Govonesi
- Time zone: UTC+1 (CET)
  - Summer (DST): UTC+2 (CEST)
- Postal code: 12040
- Dialing code: 0173
- Website: Official website

Govone (Gon [gʊŋ] or Govon [gʊ'ʊŋ]) is an Italian town of 2,294 inhabitants in the province of Cuneo in Piedmont.

It is part of the historical region of Roero and is located on the border with the province of Asti, about halfway between the cities of Alba and Asti.

The site has been inhabited since Roman times, as evidenced by numerous findings, and is mentioned in early medieval documents. Formerly a bishopric fief, then passed to the property of the Solaro family of Asti, it was later a resort for the House of Savoy in the early decades of the nineteenth century. It is now known above all for its castle, in which the philosopher Jean-Jacques Rousseau, who has just entered the service of Count Ottavio Solaro, stayed when he was just eighteen years old (year 1730).

== Economy ==
The economy of the area is mainly agricultural, with a particular emphasis to the cultivation of vines on the hillsides - red wines barbera, bonarda, dolcetto, nebbiolo and arneis white wine, as well as hazelnut plantations, while vegetables and cereals are produced in the fertile peripheral plain.

The main seat of Nutkao, an international contract manufacturer that specializes in the creation and production of creams and spreads, is located in the hamlet of Canove di Govone.

In recent times tourism has started to play an important role, the castle is a major attraction with summer concerts and other attractions in the castle grounds throughout the year.

Between March and April there is a floral event in the called "Tulips at court", combined with a costume parade of military troops with 18th-19th century period clothing.

The annual Christmas market is the 3rd most visited in Italy and is held every weekend from mid-November to just before Christmas.

Govone is located on the Roero Walks trail, popular for hiking and trail bikes.

== Govone Castle ==
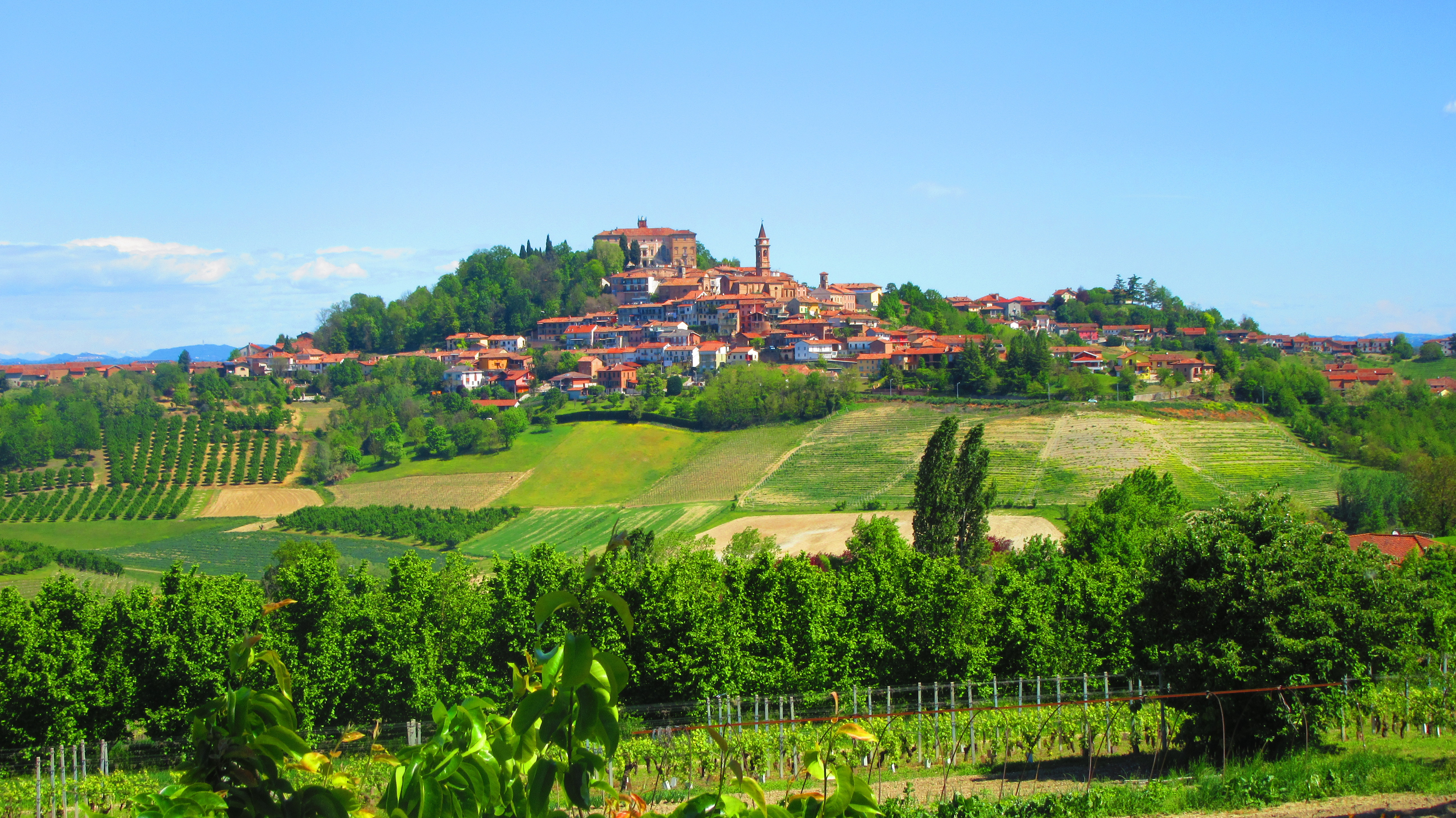
Govone and its castle.

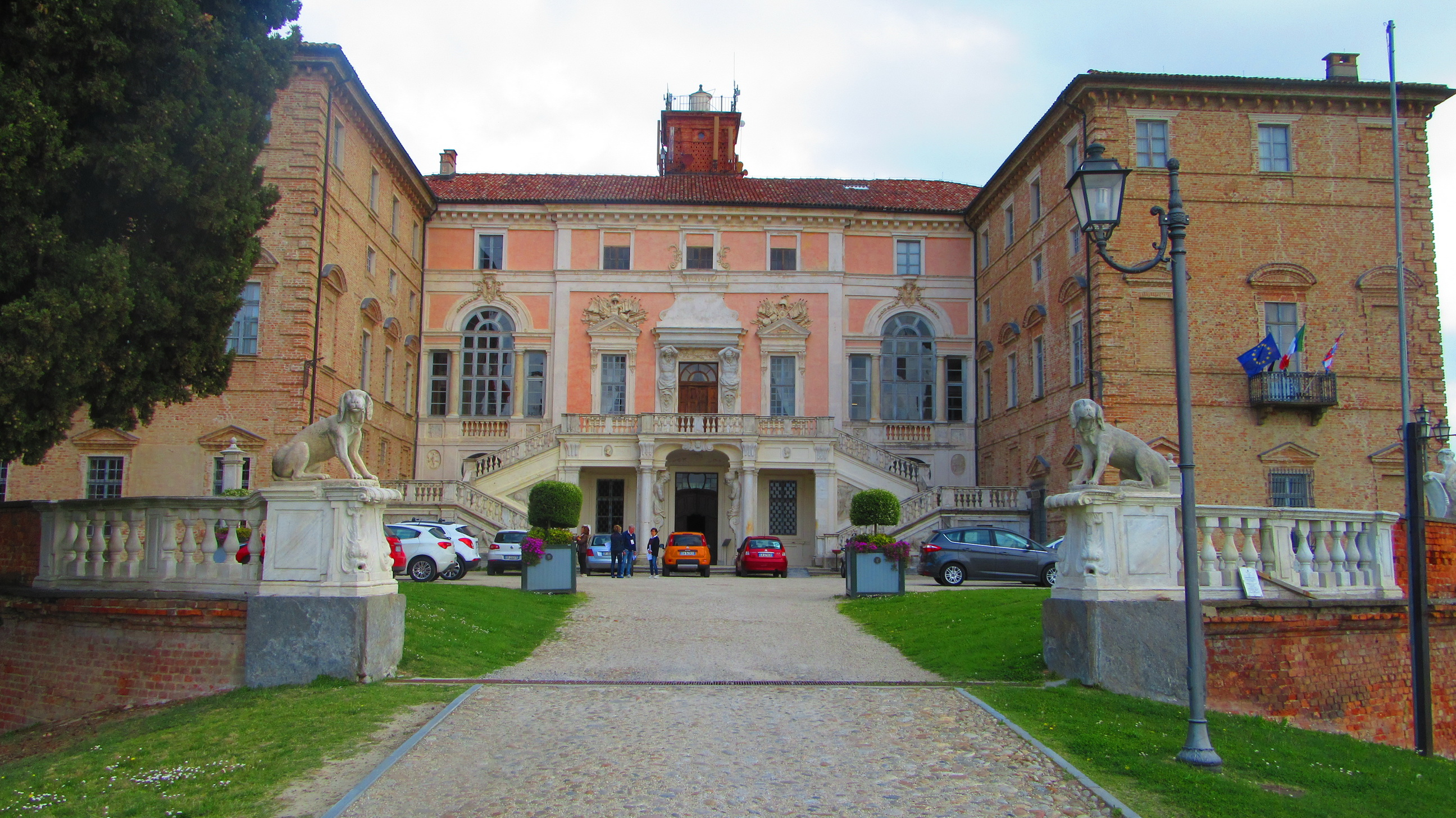

It was one of the residences of the Royal House of Savoy from 1792 to 1870, and in 1997 it was placed on the UNESCO World Heritage Site list along with 13 other residences of the House of Savoy.

In the position where the castle stands, on top of the hill, a fortress stood already in medieval times.

At the end of the seventeenth century the Solaro/Solari counts entrusted the architect Guarino Guarini with the expansion and embellishment works of the castle. The architect prepared some drawings but did not complete the project. The works resumed a century later by the architect Benedetto Alfieri who completed them starting from Guarini's drawings.

The castle became the property of the House of Savoy in 1792 and after the Napoleonic period it was chosen as a summer residence together with the ducal castle of Agliè.

King Charles Felix of Sardinia together with his wife Maria Cristina of Naples and Sicily, had the castle completely restored at the beginning of the 19th century, based on his own designs. Similarly, the adjacent park with an Italian garden was completed.

Since the end of the nineteenth century, the castle has been owned by the municipality of Govone and is now used as the town hall.

Like many other historic Savoy residences in Piedmont, it is a destination for visitors attracted especially by the monumental and spectacular two-flight grand staircase full of relief's and telamones that come from the gardens of Venaria Reale.

Some rooms are decorated with precious Chinese wallpapers; the ballroom is frescoed with scenes reproducing the mythological episode of Niobe - by Luigi Vacca and Fabrizio Sevesi. The frescoes in the large central hall are by the same painters including Pietro Fea which, with the trompé-l'œil technique, simulate the presence of statues.

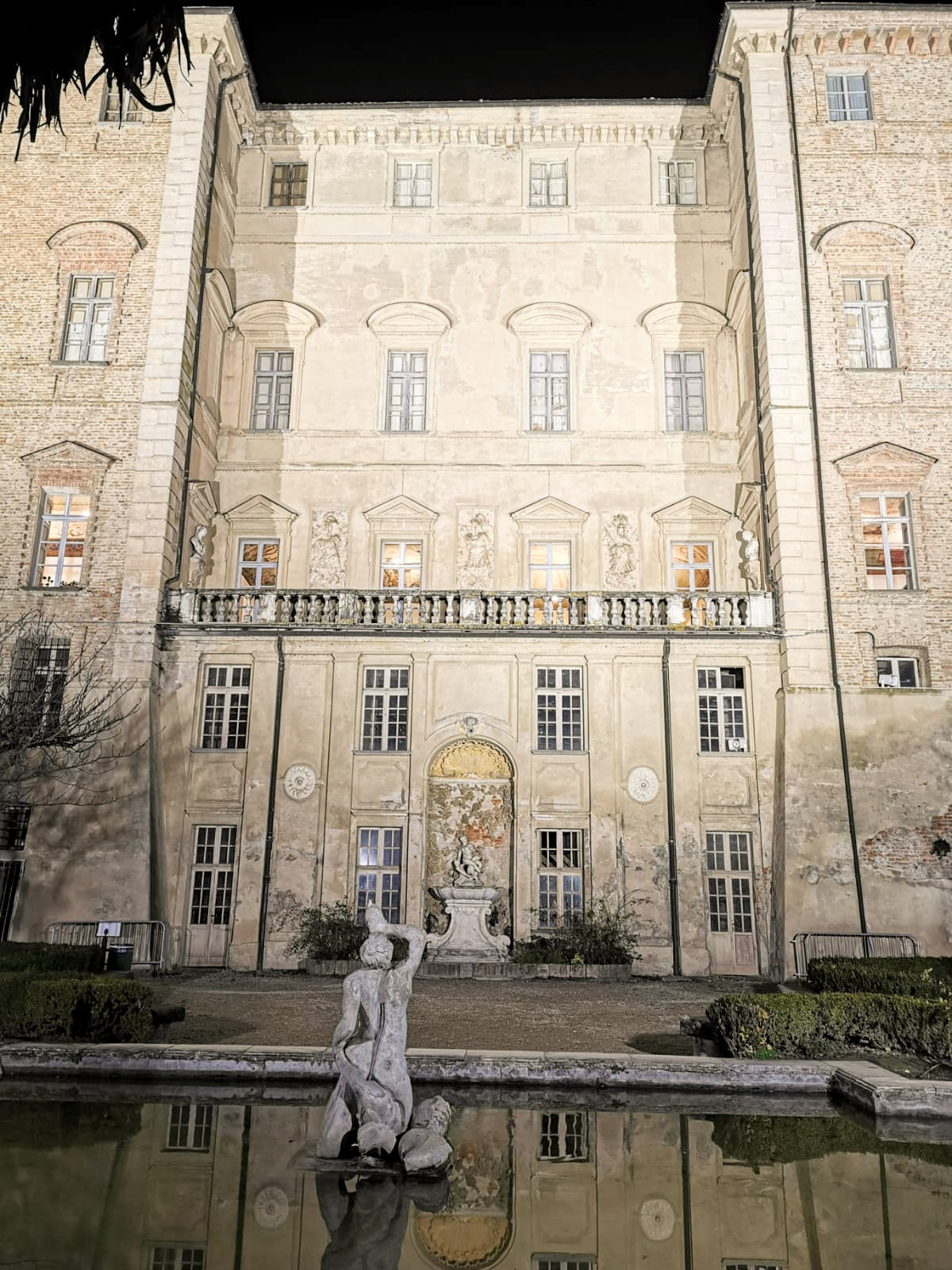
View of the castle from the gardens

Since 2007 it has been part of the 8 castles circuit, better known as Castelli Doc. The network of castles includes the manors of Grinzane Cavour, Barolo, Serralunga d'Alba, Govone, Magliano Alfieri, Roddi, Mango and Benevello. It is also included in the circuit of "Open Castles" of Southern Piedmont.
