= Swisslion Group =

Serbian food and drink company

Swisslion Group d.o.o.
- Official logo
- Native name: Свислајон Група
- Romanized name: Svislajon Grupa
- Company type: Private limited
- Industry: Food & drinks manufacturer
- Founded: June 10, 1991; 35 years ago (Current form); 1941; 85 years ago (Founded)
- Founder: Ivan R. Milosavljević Bombondžija
- Headquarters: Partizanska 42, Novi Sad, Serbia
- Number of locations: Serbia; Croatia; North Macedonia; Bosnia and Herzegovina; Montenegro
- Area served: Worldwide
- Key people: Rodoljub Drašković (CEO); Julijana Škorić (Director)
- Products: Confectionery; Ready-made meals; Pasta; Soups; Cereals; Juices; Syrups; Alcoholic drinks; Baby-food; Ice creams
- Revenue: ▼€8.34 million (2020)
- Net income: ▼ (€0.77 million) (2020)
- Total assets: ▲€54.21 million (2020)
- Total equity: ▲€39.77 million (2020)
- Owner: DRD Swisslion (92.86%); Rodoljub Drašković (7.14%)
- Number of employees: 488 (2018)
- Subsidiaries: Swisslion Industrija Alata a.d. Bosnia; Swisslion-Takovo d.o.o. Slovenia
- Website: swisslion-takovo.com
- Footnotes / references Business ID: 08245207; Tax ID: 100719468

Swisslion Group is a Serbian multinational food and drinks manufacturer headquartered in Novi Sad. Its products are produced in its factories located in Serbia, Croatia, North Macedonia, and Bosnia and Herzegovina.

Swisslion Group core activities are the production of confectionery. This includes biscuits, chocolate bars, wafers, sweets, Turkish Delight, Eurocrem, pasta, soup, cereals, ready-made meals, baby food, marmalades and jams, fruit juices, syrups, alcoholic drinks and ice creams. Swisslion Group also manufactures private labels for companies internationally.

Swisslion Group well-known products include Eurocrem, Juvitana (baby food), Eurodessert (chocolates) and Viljamovka (pear brandy).

== History ==
Swisslion Group traces its origins from the Takovo, founded in 1962 in Gornji Milanovac and Swisslion itself was founded in 1991. Takovo was state-owned during SFR Yugoslavia and one of the country's biggest industrial companies. Swisslion and Takovo merged in 2004 under the name of Swisslion Takovo, following Swisslion's acquisition of Takovo through a public tender.

Since then, Swisslion Takovo's main factories in Serbia are located in Vršac and Gornji Milanovac. The factory in Vršac primarily produces confectionery. Facilities in Gornji Milanovac spanning on over 30,000 square meters, produce ready-made meals,⁣ pasta, soups and fruit juices.

2008–2012

In 2008, Swisslion Group acquired the Croatian Euro Food Markt company based in Sisak, to reinforce its position in the Croatian market. The deal was reported to be worth €20 million.

On January 18, 2010, it was reported that a new confectionery factory in Trebinje worth €18 million had been inaugurated. Late in 2010, local media reported that further investment in the factory was planned. In early 2011, Swisslion Takovo announced that it was investing 5 million euros in new production lines for confectionery products in its factory in Trebinje.

2012–2017

In North Macedonia, production sites are located in Resen and Skopje. In March 2012, Swisslion Takovo announced that it had opened a new production unit in the town of Resen.

In 2012, local media reported that the production of "Jaffa cakes" would be moved from Swisslion's factory in Sisak (Croatia) to its factory in Trebinje (Bosnia and Herzegovina). Swisslion Takovo confirmed that it would be shifting the production of "Jaffa" cakes to Trebinje but that it would not be leaving Croatia as its factory in Sisak would continue production of other products.

2017–present

In February 2017, Swisslion Group bought wine company "Vršački vinogadi" for a sum of 4.6 million euros. In March 2017, Swisslion Group made a decision to donate "Swisslion industrija alata" company to the Government of Republika Srpska, due to accumulated tax debts. Since then, the ownership of the company remained unclear due to dispute between the company and the Government of Republika Srpska.

== Former subsidiaries ==
This is a list of the Swisslion Group former official subsidiaries in Serbia and region (as of January 2018):

- Takovo d.o.o. Gornji Milanovac
- Swisslion Miloduh a.d. Kragujevac
- Kondivik Usluge d.o.o. Vršac
- Swisslion d.o.o. Beograd
- Banat 1894 d.o.o. Vršac
- Vršački vinogradi d.o.o. Vršac

Also, other subsidiaries of the Swisslion Group were:

- Prehrambena industrija Swisslion d.o.o. Skopje, North Macedonia
- Swisslion Mak d.o.o. Skopje, North Macedonia
- Swisslion Agroplod d.o.o. Resen, North Macedonia
- Swisslion Agrar d.o.o. Resen, North Macedonia
- Swisslion d.o.o. Sisak, Sisak, Croatia

== See also ==
- List of bean-to-bar chocolate manufacturers
- List of food companies
- List of companies of the Socialist Federal Republic of Yugoslavia
