= Idilia Foods =

Spanish food company

- Company type: Sociedad Limitada
- Industry: Food processing
- Founded: Barcelona, Spain (1940)
- Founder: José Ignacio Ferrero Cabanach; José María Ventura Mallofré
- Headquarters: Valencia, Spain
- Area served: Nationwide
- Revenue: 194,000,000 euro (2023)
- Net income: 20,000,000 euro (2023)
- Number of employees: 350 (2023)
- Website: www.idilia.es

Idilia Foods (formerly Nutrexpa) is a Spanish food business group. The company is headquartered in Barcelona and was established in 1940. It produces food items such as fish stock cubes, baker's yeast, caramel or honey.

Some major brands of the company are:

- Granja San Francisco honey (since the beginning).
- Cola Cao, soluble chocolate.
- La Piara pâté range of products (since 1988, when this company was taken over).
- Nocilla chocolate and hazelnut spread (since 2002).

In the context of an internationalization policy after consolidation on the internal Spanish market, Nutrexpa expanded to Portugal where it sells the same products as in Spain in view of the proximity and affinity between the two markets. It has expanded business operations to other countries, as Chile and China.

In 2014, the Ferrero and Ventura families decided to divide the company into two groups. The segregation came into force on January 1, 2015. The cocoa division, baptized Idilia Foods and which belongs to the Ferrero family, owns the chocolate brands Cola Cao, Nocilla, Paladín, the dairy beverage brand Okey and the sweetener Mesura, with two factories in Spain and one in China (which it sold in December 2015). By Adam Foods, specialized in biscuits and food under the control of the Ventura family, manages the Artiach and Cuétara cookie brands; the Phoskitos buns; La Piara pâté; Bocadelia sandwich mix; the San Francisco Honey Farm; the concession of Pez sweets and Aneto bottled broths, with six factories in Spain and one in Portugal.

In 2017, Idilia Foods announced the transfer of its headquarters to the city of Valencia due to the political situation in Catalonia, although the operational headquarters has remained in Barcelona.

In January 2019, Xavier Pons joined as CEO, coming from Mars, replacing Ricardo Anmella.
