= Pietro Ferrero =

Italian businessman, founder of Ferrero SpA (1898–1949)

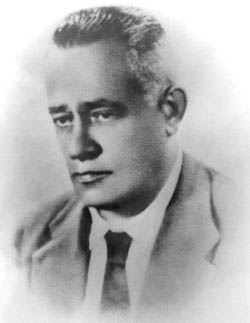
- Born: 2 September 1898; Farigliano, Kingdom of Italy
- Died: 2 March 1949 (aged 50); Farigliano, Italy
- Occupations: Chocolatier, confectionery company founder
- Known for: Ferrero SpA
- Children: Michele Ferrero
- Relatives: Pietro Ferrero Jr. (grandson); Giovanni Ferrero (grandson)

Pietro Ferrero (Italian pronunciation: [ˈpjɛːtro ferˈrɛːro]; 2 September 1898 – 2 March 1949) was an Italian businessman who was the founder of Ferrero SpA, an Italian confectionery and chocolatier company. His company invented Nutella, a hazelnut-cream spread, which is now sold in over 160 countries. His company also created Ferrero Rocher, Tic Tacs and the Kinder Chocolate brand.

== Biography ==
Ferrero was born on 2 September 1898 in Farigliano, a municipality in the Piedmontese Langhe, and was the eldest son of Michele Ferrero and Clara Devalle. He had a younger brother, Giovanni. The Ferreros were known for their hard work ethic. After marrying Piera Cillario, they moved to Alba, Piedmont, eventually settling in Turin.

In 1940, Pietro opened a large pastry shop in Turin in via Sant'Anselmo, but this didn't pan out, so he returned to Alba, where he opened a new shop.

In 1942, Pietro Ferrero opened a laboratory in Alba in via Rattazzi to make sweets, and he spent a lot of time there in the conception of innovative but cheap sweet products. In the midst of World War II, the idea of using hazelnuts, widely used in Ferrero recipes and widely available on site, was a necessity to exploit low-cost raw materials. In Turin, Pietro often watched the workers go to work, and had begun to think of a sweet alternative that could replace bread and tomatoes. This is how he invented a chocolate and hazelnut paste, which had to be substantial but at the same time affordable. He committed to working constantly to perfect his recipe, with help from his wife. Workers were eager to be hired by his laboratory due to the lack of available jobs.

In 1946, after four years of attempts, Pietro launched a hazelnut-based cream on the market and initially called it Pasta Gianduja and then Giandujot, associating it phonetically with the famous Piedmontese carnival mask. Piero hadn't initially considered children as his audience, but they turned out be one of the primary consumers of his product. In February 1946, the demand for the product increased so much that artisanal production alone was no longer possible. Together with his wife, Piera Cillario, Pietro founded the company "Ferrero". To meet the demand, production had to be increased and new workers hired. The first factory was built on land purchased a few years earlier in Alba, in via Vivaro (where the Foundation stands today).

In May 1946, complete with the deed of incorporation at the Chamber of Commerce, the Ferrero industry was officially born. Pietro also involves his brother Giovanni, to whom he entrusts the organization of sales and the creation of a direct distribution network between the factory and the buyers. Also around this time, twenty-year-old Michele, Pietro's son, begins to collaborate with his father.

In September 1948, a flood from the Tanaro floods the Alba factory, which remains isolated. By the end of the month, the factory is back to business as before.

On 2 March 1949, Pietro Ferrero died, perhaps suffering from a heart attack, exhausted, it is said, by the frenetic distribution activity that he personally carried out, driving his Topolino through the streets of Piedmont. His wife and brother, later Michele, take over the management of the company. The management of the company remains family-run and Giovanni Ferrero, Pietro's younger brother, expands the sale and distribution of his products, directly from the factory to the retailer, with specific vans.

== Personal life ==
In 1924, Pietro married Piera Cillario. On 26 April 1925, his only child, Michele Ferrero, was born in Dogliani.
