= Michele Ferrero =

Italian entrepreneur (1925–2015)

- Born: 26 April 1925; Dogliani, Piedmont, Kingdom of Italy
- Died: 14 February 2015 (aged 89); Monte Carlo, Monaco
- Occupation: Owner of Ferrero SpA
- Known for: Nutella; Mon Chéri; Kinder Chocolate; Ferrero Rocher; Tic Tacs; Kinder Eggs
- Spouse: Maria Franca Fissolo (m. 1962)
- Children: Pietro; Giovanni
- Parents: Pietro Ferrero (father); Piera Cillario (mother)
- Website: www.ferrero.com

Michele Ferrero (Italian pronunciation: [miˈkɛːle ferˈrɛːro]; 26 April 1925 – 14 February 2015) was an Italian billionaire businessman. He owned the chocolate manufacturer Ferrero SpA, Europe's second-largest confectionery company (at the time of his death), which he developed from the small bakery and café of his father in Alba, Piedmont. His first big success was his work with Francesco Rivella in adding vegetable oil to the traditional gianduja paste to make the popular spread Nutella.

== Early life ==
Michele Ferrero was born on 26 April 1925 in Dogliani, the only child of Pietro Ferrero, who founded the Ferrero company, and his wife Piera Cillario.

== Career ==
Ferrero joined the firm in 1949.

He was the richest person in Italy, with a personal wealth of $26 billion surpassing Silvio Berlusconi in March 2008. In May 2014, the Bloomberg Billionaires Index listed Ferrero as the 20th richest person in the world.

Ferrero's brands include Nutella, Mon Chéri, Kinder Chocolate, Ferrero Rocher, Tic Tacs and Kinder Eggs.

From 1997, his sons, Pietro Ferrero Jr. and his brother Giovanni Ferrero, co-led the company. After Pietro died in April 2011, Giovanni became the sole CEO.

== Personal life ==
Ferrero married Maria Franca Fissolo in 1962, and they had two sons together, Giovanni Ferrero and Pietro Ferrero Jr.

He was a devout Catholic; visited the Lourdes shrine annually, and had a Madonna placed in every factory and office. At the celebration of the 50th anniversary of the founding of his company, he said: "The success of Ferrero we owe to Our Lady of Lourdes; without her we can do little."

Ferrero died on 14 February 2015 aged 89, at his home in Monte Carlo, Monaco, after a long illness.

== Distinctions ==
- Knight of the Order of Merit for Labour (1971)
- Knight Grand Cross of the Order of Merit of the Italian Republic (2005)

== See also ==
- List of billionaires
