= Cola Cao song =

The "Cola Cao song" (Spanish: Canción del Cola Cao) was a popular radiophonic advertisement in Spain used to promote the product Cola Cao in 1952. It is a nostalgia item identified with the metallic container. The song was aired in 1955 and composed by Aurelio Jordi Dotras, and its first verses are still remembered: "Yo soy aquel negrito del África Tropical / que cultivando cantaba la canción del Cola Cao /..." ("I am that little black guy from Tropical Africa / who sang the Cola Cao song while cultivating").

It was one of the first advertisement in Spain which was repeated in the radio. In 1956, due to the song success, the company had from seventeen employees to a hundred of them. The company released a new version of the song in 2020, modifying the lyrics perceived as racist.
