= Cola Cao =

Brand of chocolate drink

- Type: Malted dairy drink
- Manufacturer: Idilia Foods
- Origin: Spain
- Introduced: 1946
- Variants: Cola Cao Original, Cola Cao Turbo, Cola Cao 0%, Cola Cao Noir, Cola Cao Puro, Avenacao, Cola Cao Shake, Cola Cao Shake 0%, Cola Cao Complet, Cola Cao Energy
- Website: www.colacao.es

Cola Cao is a sugary chocolate drink with vitamins and minerals that originated in Spain and is now produced and marketed in several countries. The brand is owned by the Barcelona-based company Idilia Foods (formerly Nutrexpa).

== History ==
In 1945, José María Ventura and José Ignacio Ferrero, two brothers-in-law from the Gràcia neighbourhood of Barcelona, Spain, created a soluble cocoa called Cola Cao. The "Cola Cao song" used to promote the product in 1952 is a nostalgia item.

In 1962, they began to broadcast their first advertisements on television, which adapted the radio tune to some cartoons. In 1972, Cola Cao was associated for the first time with the slogan "Olympic food", after becoming a sponsor of the Spanish Olympic team at the 1972 Summer Olympic Games. In the 1980s, "Cola Cao VIT" was produced, an instant and enriched version with vitamins of the classic Cola Cao. It went out of production in the late 1980s.

In 1988, in a connection with the 1992 Summer Olympics scheduled for Barcelona Cola Cao began sponsoring the Spanish Olympic Committee through the ADO Programme, an alliance that continues until today. Along the same lines and to promote urban sports, the brand installed what are popularly known as "Cola Cao Circuits" in green areas of a large number of Spanish cities, such as Esplugues de Llobregat and Córdoba, among others. In the mid-nineties, with the slogan the same flavour of Cola Cao with half the calories, a version of Cola Cao without sugar and with sweeteners called "Cola Cao Low in Calories" was launched, which in the mid-2000s was renamed "Cola Cao Light".

== Ingredients ==
Cola Cao is prepared using sugar, processed cocoa, wheat flour and cola nut, and is enriched with vitamins, calcium and phosphorus.

== Preparation ==
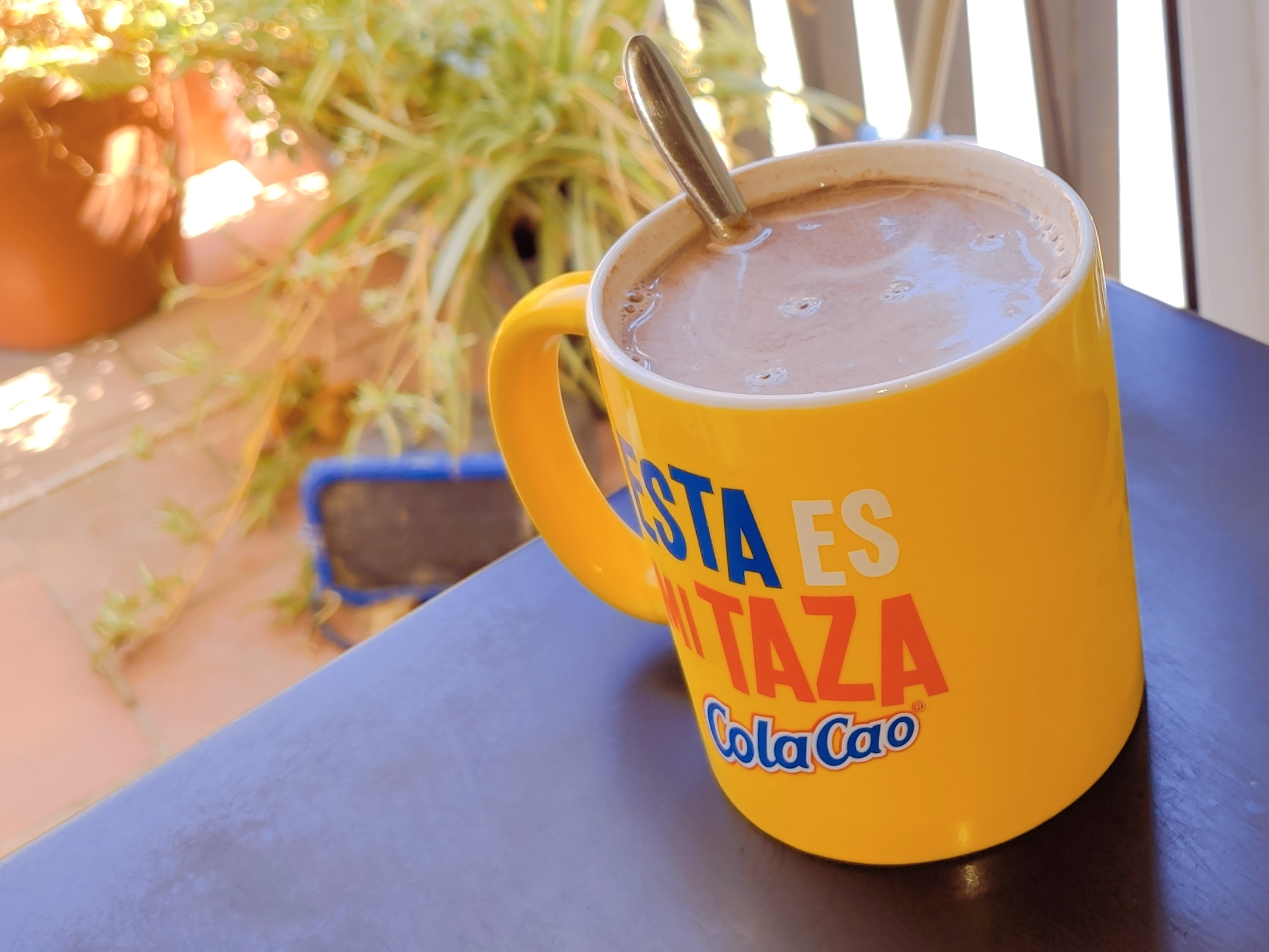
Warm Cola Cao in a mug

Cola Cao comes in a powder form which is intended to be mixed with milk, but can also be mixed with water or soya milk. It can also be added to breakfast cereal or used as a baking ingredient. In Spain in particular, Cola Cao is a popular accompaniment to breakfast, or dinner.

== Advertising ==
In Spain, since the late 80's, Cola Cao has been marketed in association with the Olympic Games and other sporting events.

== Distribution ==
Cola Cao in powder form is sold in containers of various sizes, and it is also produced in liquid form that is purveyed in plastic bottles.

== Marketing ==
Cola Cao is exported to various countries such as Spain, Portugal, Chile, Bosnia and Herzegovina, and China (where is known as 高乐高 Gao-le-Gao). It was introduced to Japan (under the name コラカオ), Russia (under the name Кола Као) and Greece in early 1990s only to be discontinued a few years later. However, since 2007, "Cola Cao Chocolate Roll Cakes" manufactured in China are sold at dollar stores.

Cola Cao factories have production lines unique to each region:

- European market: Factory in Barcelona, Spain
  - Cola Cao Original, Light, Turbo, Fiber, Energy, Complete and more.
- South American market: Factory in Santiago, Chile
  - Cola Cao Original, Light
  - Cola Cao Cereal
- Asian market: Factory in Tianjin, China
  - Cola Cao Original, Fruit Flavor
  - Cola Cao Roll Cake
  - Cola Cao Spread

== Public image ==
Cola Cao has been closely compared to Nesquik online. On March 31, 2016, an argument began between parody Twitter accounts of the two brands. The Cola Cao account said that while they have a song, Nesquik only has a talking rabbit; this "says it all". The Nesquik account responded by comparing Cola Cao's signature "bits" to lumps of faeces. This resulted in the official pages of the two brands as well as Nestlé clarifying the correct, verified company pages.

The OCU, a member organization of Euroconsumers, compared the two brands to help to resolve the arguments online about which brand is better. They compared the cocoa contents and added fibers of the two brands and concluded that, although other companies provided higher quality chocolate sources, Cola Cao placed 4th: higher than Nesquik.

People on Twitter and Facebook argue about which is better and try to bring everyday evidence to suggest that one company has a new product which makes it better than the other; and this has quickly spread onto the local news. For example, on July 6, 2020 McDonald's released the Cola Cao McFlurry which people have used as arguments against Nesquik, questioning if the company has this or not.

== See also ==
- List of chocolate beverages
