= Giovanni Ferrero =

Italian businessman (born 1964)

- Born: 21 September 1964 (age 62); Farigliano, Italy
- Education: European Schools
- Alma mater: Lebanon Valley College
- Occupation: Businessman
- Known for: CEO of Ferrero SpA; richest person in Italy
- Title: Executive chairman, Ferrero SpA
- Spouse: Paola Rossi
- Children: 2
- Relatives: Michele Ferrero (father); Pietro Ferrero (grandfather); Pietro Ferrero Jr. (brother)

Giovanni Ferrero (Italian pronunciation: [dʒoˈvanni ferˈrɛːro]; born 21 September 1964) is an Italian billionaire businessman. He assumed leadership of the confectionery company Ferrero SpA after the death of his brother, Pietro Ferrero, in 2011. His personal fortune is estimated at US$48.3 billion in 2026 according to Forbes, making him the 37th richest person in the world, and the richest person in Italy.

== Early life ==
He was born in Farigliano, Italy, the son of Maria Franca Fissolo and Michele Ferrero, the owner of the multinational confectionery corporation Ferrero.

== Education ==
In 1975, he moved to Brussels, Belgium, where he studied at the European Schools. Then he moved to the US, where he studied marketing at Lebanon Valley College.

== Career ==
On completing his studies, he returned to Europe to work in the family company. In 1997, he became joint CEO of Ferrero together with his brother Pietro.

In April 2011, after the sudden death of his brother in South Africa, he became the sole CEO of Ferrero Group. His father, Michele Ferrero, remained as executive chairman.

Michele Ferrero died in 2015, leaving the company solely in Giovanni's hands.

American business magazine Forbes reported that Giovanni then took over the role of executive chairman in 2015, and held both the titles of CEO and executive chairman for two years until he hired Lapo Civiletti to take over as CEO in 2017.

== Publications ==
- "Marketing progetto 2000. La gestione della complessità", 1990
- "Stelle di tenebra", Mondadori 1999
- "Campo Paradiso", Rizzoli 2007
- "Il canto delle farfalle", Rizzoli 2010

== Personal life ==
Ferrero is married to Paola Rossi. They have two sons and reside in Berchem-Sainte-Agathe, a municipality in the Brussels-Capital region.

== Bibliography ==
- "Storia". Ferrero.it.
