= Hazelnut butter =

Food spread made from hazelnuts

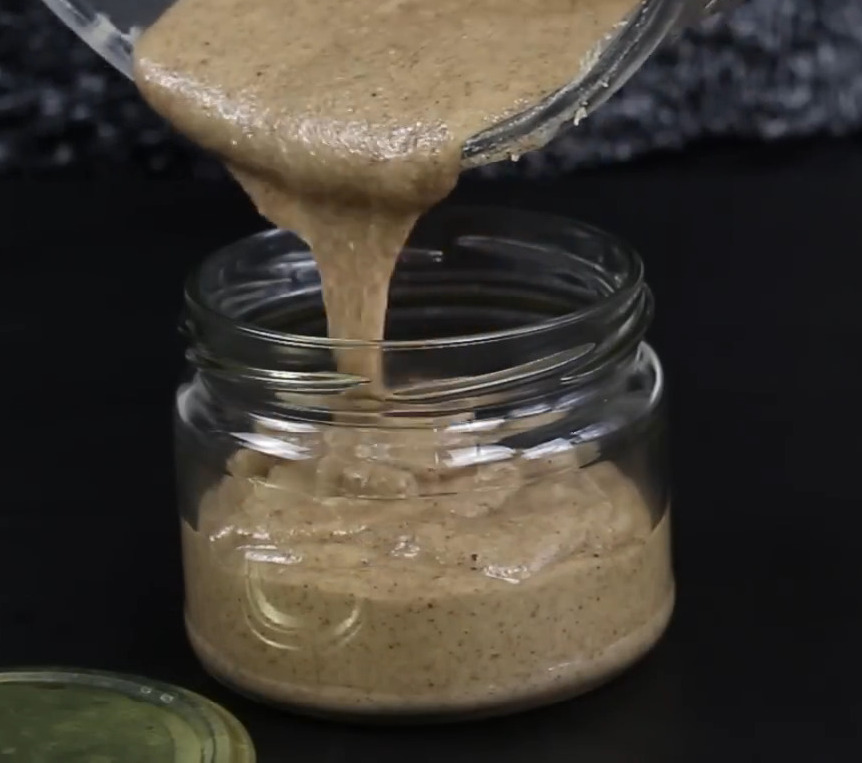
- Type: Spread
- Main ingredients: Hazelnuts

Hazelnut butter or hazelnut paste is a food spread made from crushed and blended hazelnuts. More commonly found in Europe, hazelnut butter is also familiar when mixed with chocolate as an ingredient in chocolate spreads. Hazelnut butter is available in both crunchy and smooth varieties, and can be made from either raw or roasted hazelnuts. Gianduja is also a type of chocolate stretched with hazelnut butter.

Hazelnut butter is high in natural fats and susceptible to oil separation, so it should be stirred before use to distribute the oils evenly and refrigerated after opening to slow re-separation and prevent spoilage.

== Nutritional information ==
Hazelnut butter is high in monounsaturated fats, particularly oleic acid, shown to play a role in reducing the adverse effects of low-density lipoprotein (LDL). Hazelnut butter is also a good source of dietary protein and vitamin E.

Raw food enthusiasts believe the butter made from unroasted hazelnuts possesses greater nutritional value and more beneficial enzymes, both of which would otherwise be destroyed in the roasting process. Some also advocate that butter prepared from raw hazelnuts should remain refrigerated both before and after opening to minimize oxidation and rancidity.

Hazelnut butter can be used in dishes that call for peanut butter, and as an alternative for those with peanut allergies. Hazelnut butter contains more than twice as much vitamin E as peanut butter and is higher in monounsaturated fat.

== See also ==
- List of spreads
