= Nudossi =

Brand of hazelnut spread

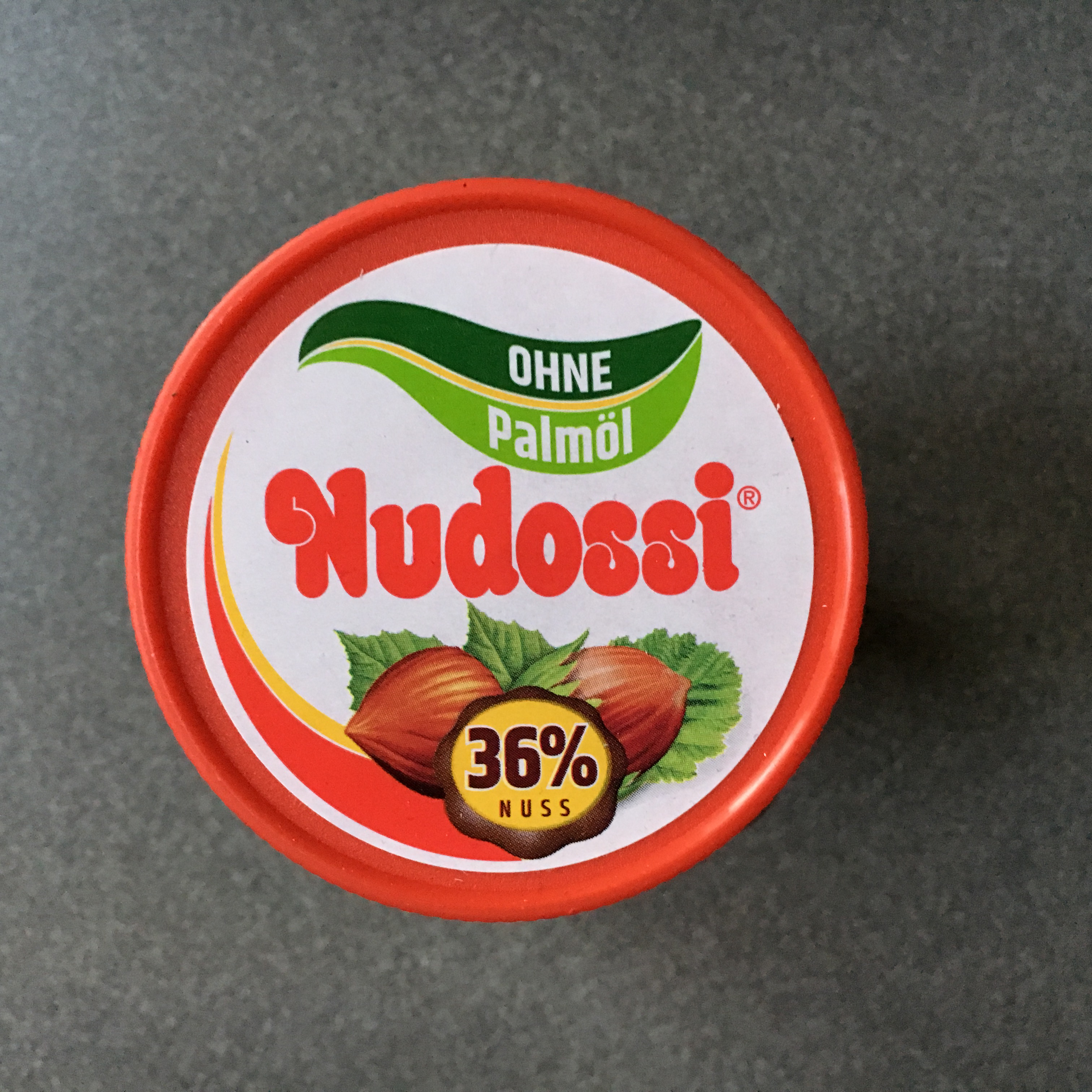
- Type: Spread
- Place of origin: German Democratic Republic
- Created by: Vadossi
- Main ingredients: Hazelnuts, sugar, vegetable oils, cocoa powder
- Food energy (per 100 g serving): 543 kcal (2,270 kJ)
Nutritional value
(per 100 g serving)
- Protein: 8.2 g
- Fat: 32 g
- Carbohydrate: 53 g

Nudossi (German pronunciation: [nuˈdɔsi]) is a brand of sweetened hazelnut cocoa spread manufactured by the Saxon and Dresdner baking and confectionery GmbH & Co. KG, formerly known as Vadossi. In its plastic container with a red lid, Nudossi is the manufacturer's best-known product. Well known as a product during the German Democratic Republic (GDR), it was often compared to Nutella which had been widely available outside the Communist bloc since 1965. In 1972, the company was nationalized and production was discontinued after German reunification, as demand initially dropped.

Production of Nudossi would begin again in spring of 1999 after a pause in production which lasted several years, largely due to Ostalgie over the product among former East German residents. Nudossi is often known as "Ost-Nutella" ("East (German) Nutella"), despite the fact that the recipe today differs vastly from the recipe used in the GDR. Nudossi has a hazelnut content of 36% compared to Nutella's 13%. The recipe was adjusted at the end of 2016 so that it now contains less fat (from 35 g to 32 g) and more sugar (from 46 g to 50 g). Since April 2017, palm oil-free nut nougat cream has also been sold in 300 g jars.

Other spreads such as the chocolate-nut-coconut cream "Naschi" and the milk-cocoa cream "Nu Pagadi" as well as marzipan bread, Baumkuchen, Dresden Christmas stollen and wafers come from the same manufacturer. The company has 35 employees and a turnover of 12 million euros a year. A total of 4.5 million jars and tubs of cream are delivered every year.

== Ingredients ==
Sugar, hazelnuts (36%), oils from plant sources, low-fat cocoa powder, low-fat milk powder, lecithin, salt.

=== Since 2019 ===
Sugar (50%), hazelnuts (36%), vegetable fat (palm oil or salnut oil), low-fat cocoa powder, skimmed milk powder, emulsifier: sunflower lecithins, mono- and diglycerides of Edible fats, salt. Energy content: 100 grams have 2392 kJ (574 kcal); 37g fats. Due to the skimmed milk powder, Nudossi contains lactose.

UTZ-certified cocoa is used in the palm oil-free Nudossi.

== Producer ==
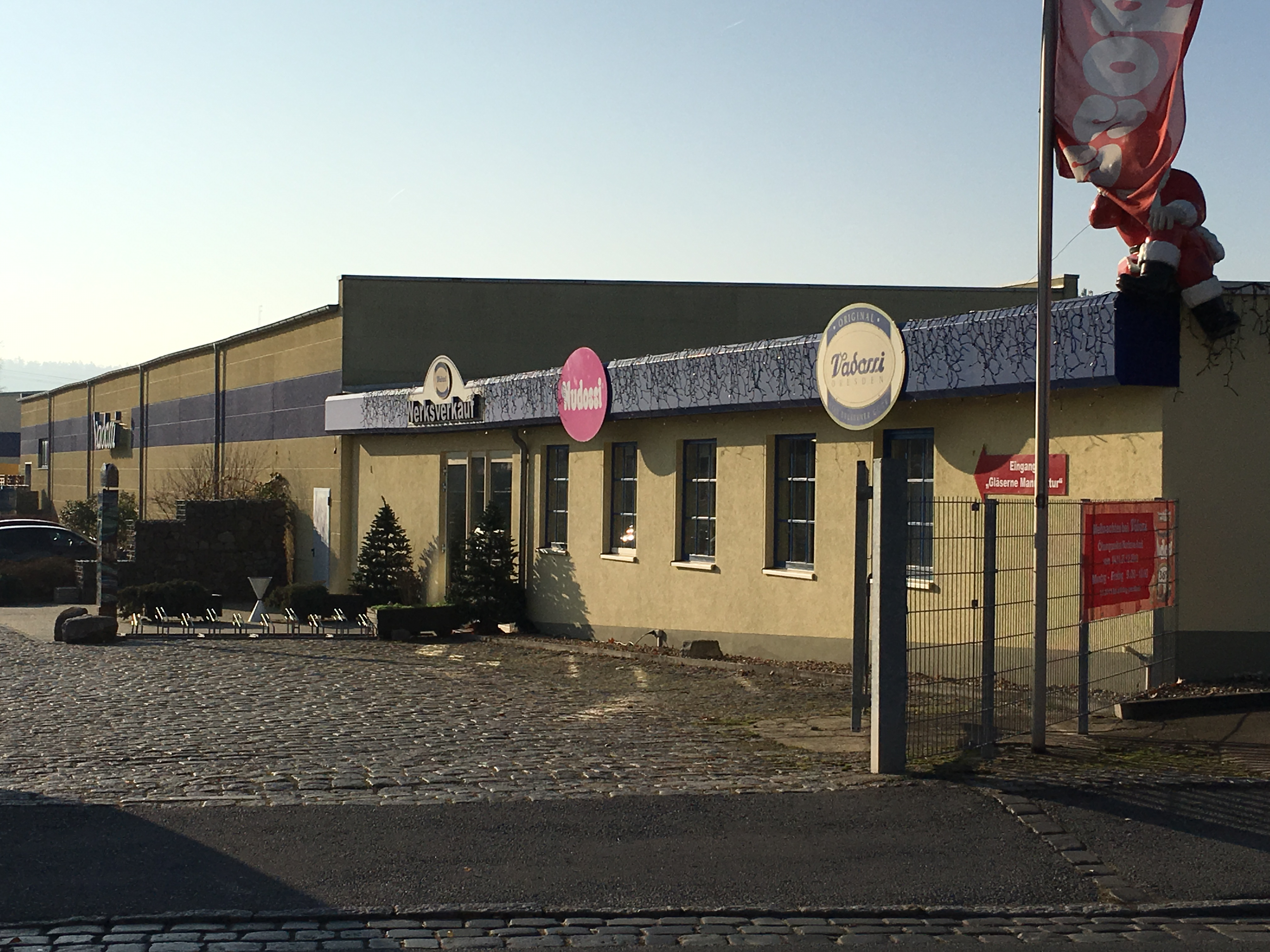
Factory outlet in Radebeul with glass production, access from kötitzer street

From 1920, Friedrich Karl Lischka produced pastries and chocolate bars in Dresden-Plauen. In 1924 he moved to Kötzschenbroda, today a district of Radebeul, to continue his company as Vadossi, with only 40 employees. He had his new building at Fabrikstraße 4 built by master builder Franz Jörissen. The company survived the war with minor damage to the building and was not dismantled by the victorious powers. This meant that confectionery production could be started up again in June 1945 with a workforce of 50 people. Within a few years, the workforce grew to 240 people. Beginning in 1957, the company traded as Vadossi KG Schokoladen- und Zuckerwarenfabrik with state participation.

The production of Nudossi began in 1970. The already mentioned high nut content was originally born out of necessity: In the GDR, hazelnuts were easier to get than artificial flavors. In 1972, the company became part of the Dresden-based Dresdner Candy Factory Elbflorenz, run as their Vadossi plant. With the closure of the "Elbflorenz" combine in 1991, the production of Nudossi was discontinued, and the plants were scrapped or sold.

The company went bankrupt and was purchased in 1994 by the company Sächsische Spezialitäten Hartmann GbR. This company has produced Nudossi again since 1999. When the banks refused to open fresh credit lines for the purchase of raw ingredients for Christmas confectionaries, the company was forced to declare bankruptcy on 25 July 2005. After receiving financial assistance, the company was able to resume production on 8 August 2005.

Today, six tons of Nudossi are produced every day. For this purpose, 300 tons of hazelnut pulp are imported from Turkey every year.

== Brand-name history ==
After the original GDR-era trademark of the name Nudossi expired, the Mitteldeutsche Rundfunk renewed the trademark in 1996, in addition to nut-nougat crème also for events, radio broadcasts and the like (German Patent and Trademark Office, register number/file number: 39632419.3). In the spring of 1999 the trademark name was sold to the Sächsische Spezialitäten Hartmann GbR.

== More brands ==
Other brands of Saxon and Dresden baked goods and confectionery:

- Vadossi
- Oma Hartmann
- Elbflorenz
- Naschi Schokocreme Nuss-Kokos 200g (since 1972)
- Nu Pagadi Milch-Kakao-Creme 200g

The Original Dresdner Christstollen sold under the Vadossi brand bears the Golden Seal and the brand is a protected geographical product.

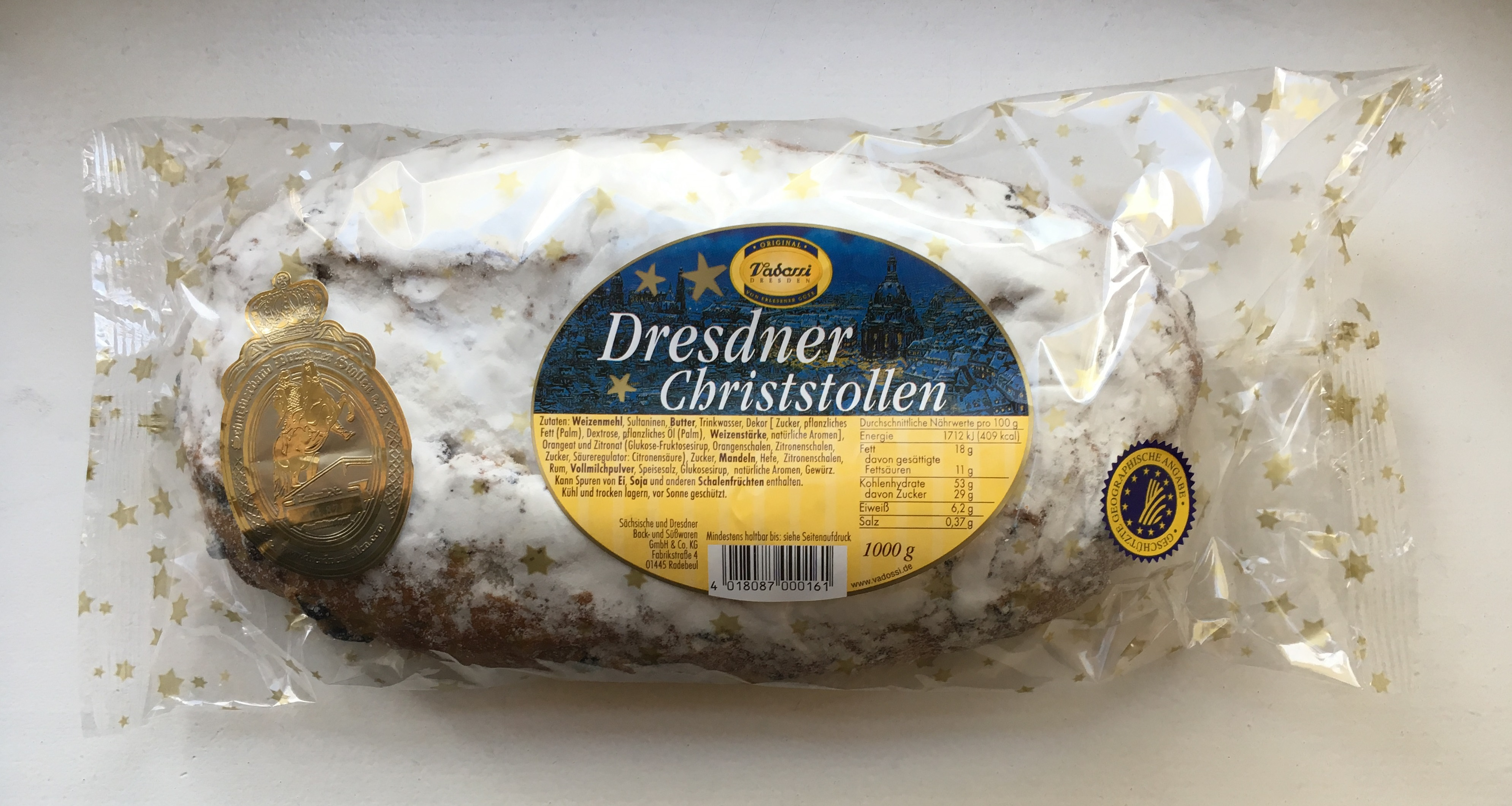
Original Dresdner Christstollen by Vadossi

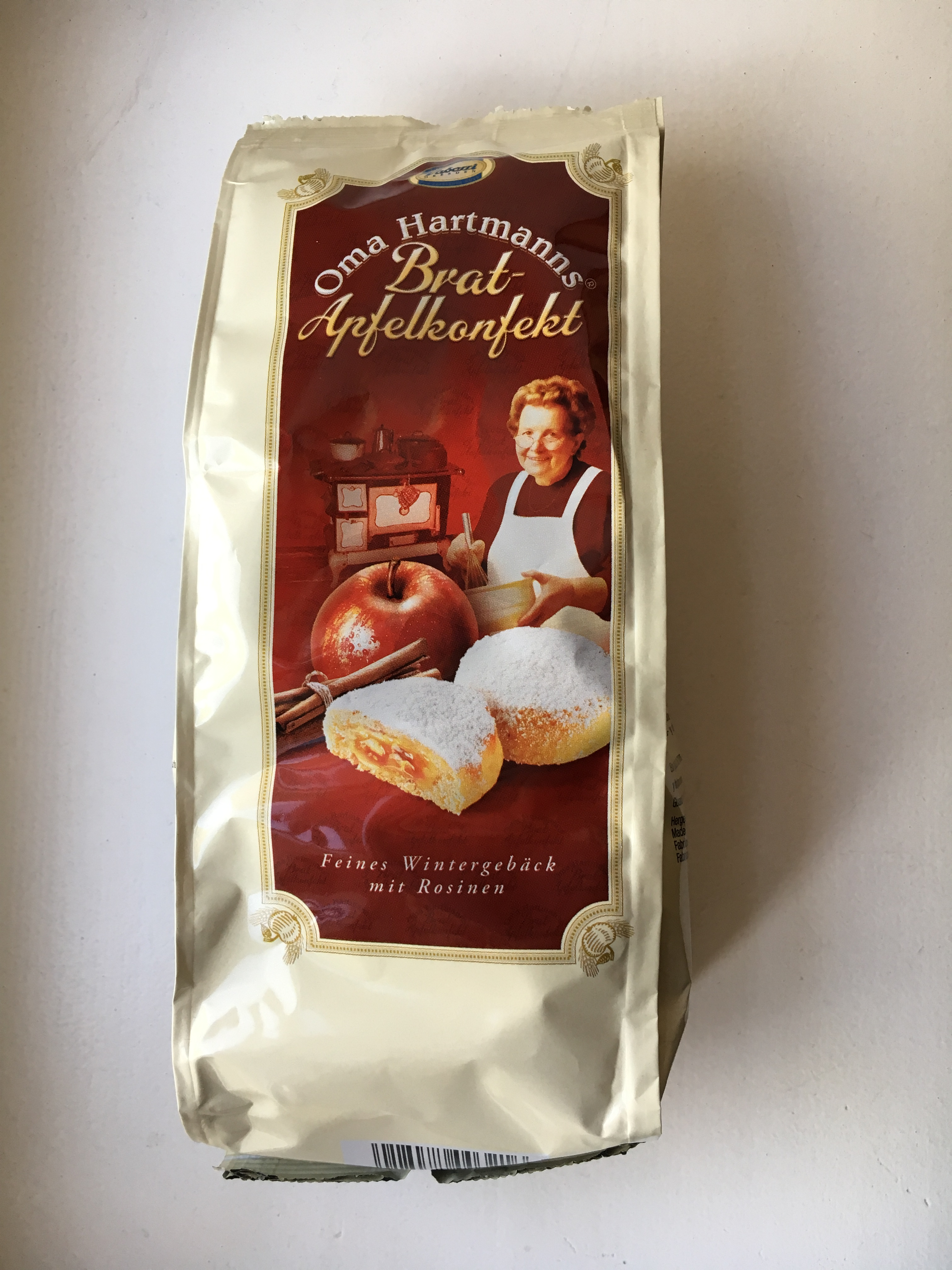
Bratapfelkonfekt by Oma Hartmanns

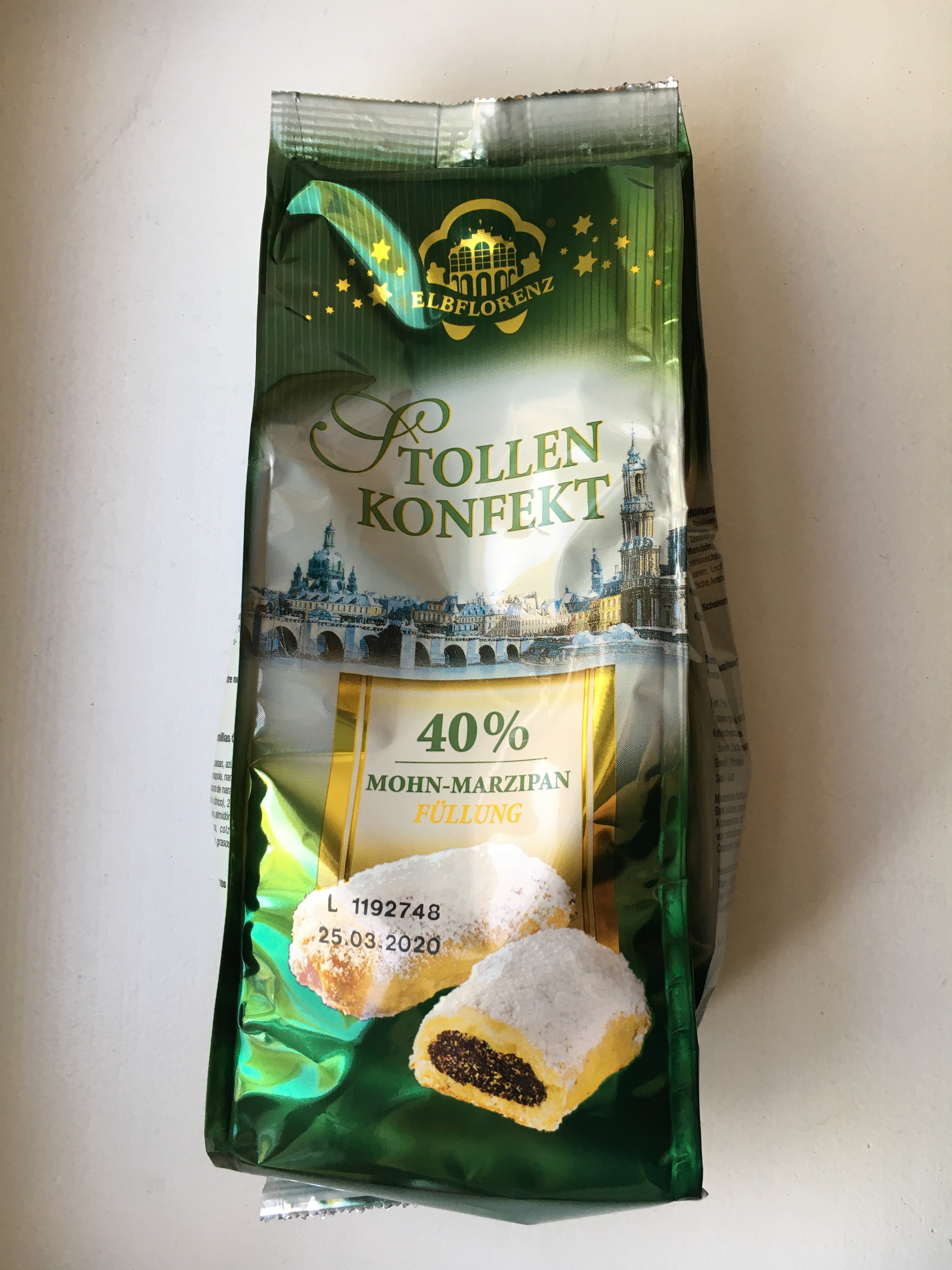
Stollenkonfekt by Elbflorenz

== Literature ==
- Frank Andert (Red.): Stadtlexikon Radebeul. Historisches Handbuch für die Lößnitz. Publisher: Stadtarchiv Radebeul. 2nd, slightly modified edition. City archive, Radebeul 2006, ISBN 3-938460-05-9.
- Jürgen Helfricht: Der Nudossi-Code. Köstliche Backrezepte & raffinierte Kochideen und die Geschichte der feinen Nusscrème. Husum 2012, ISBN 978-3-89876-607-4.
- Arnd Zschiesche, Oliver Carlo Errichiello: Nudossi: Der Osten auf dem Brot. In: Arnd Zschiesche, Oliver Carlo Errichiello (ed.): Erfolgsgeheimnis Ost. Survival-Strategien der besten Marken – und was Manager daraus lernen können. Gabler, Wiesbaden 2009, ISBN 978-3-8349-1615-0, pp. 144-149.

== See also ==
- Nocilla
- List of spreads
