= Ferrero Rocher =

Brand of chocolate

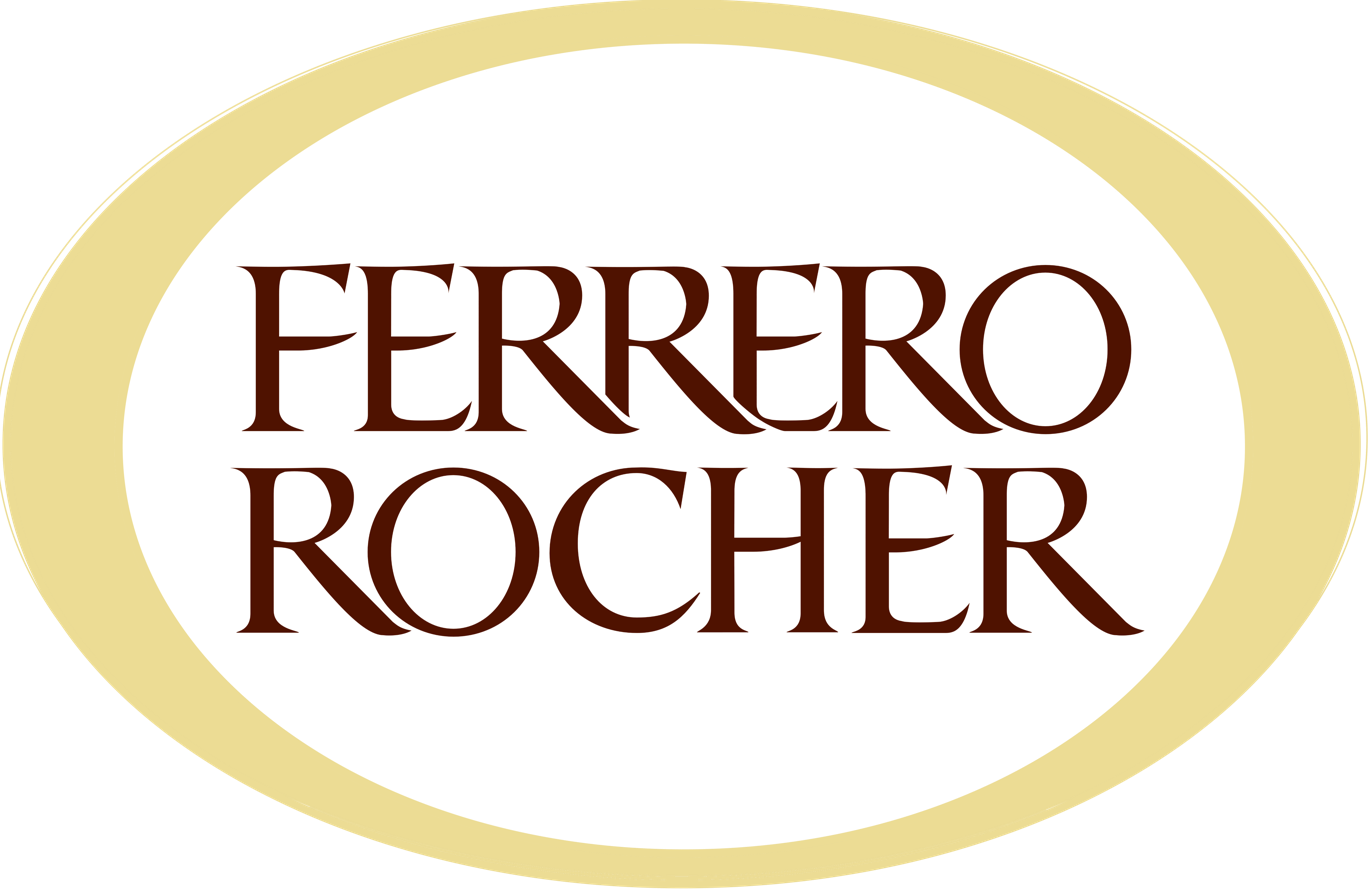

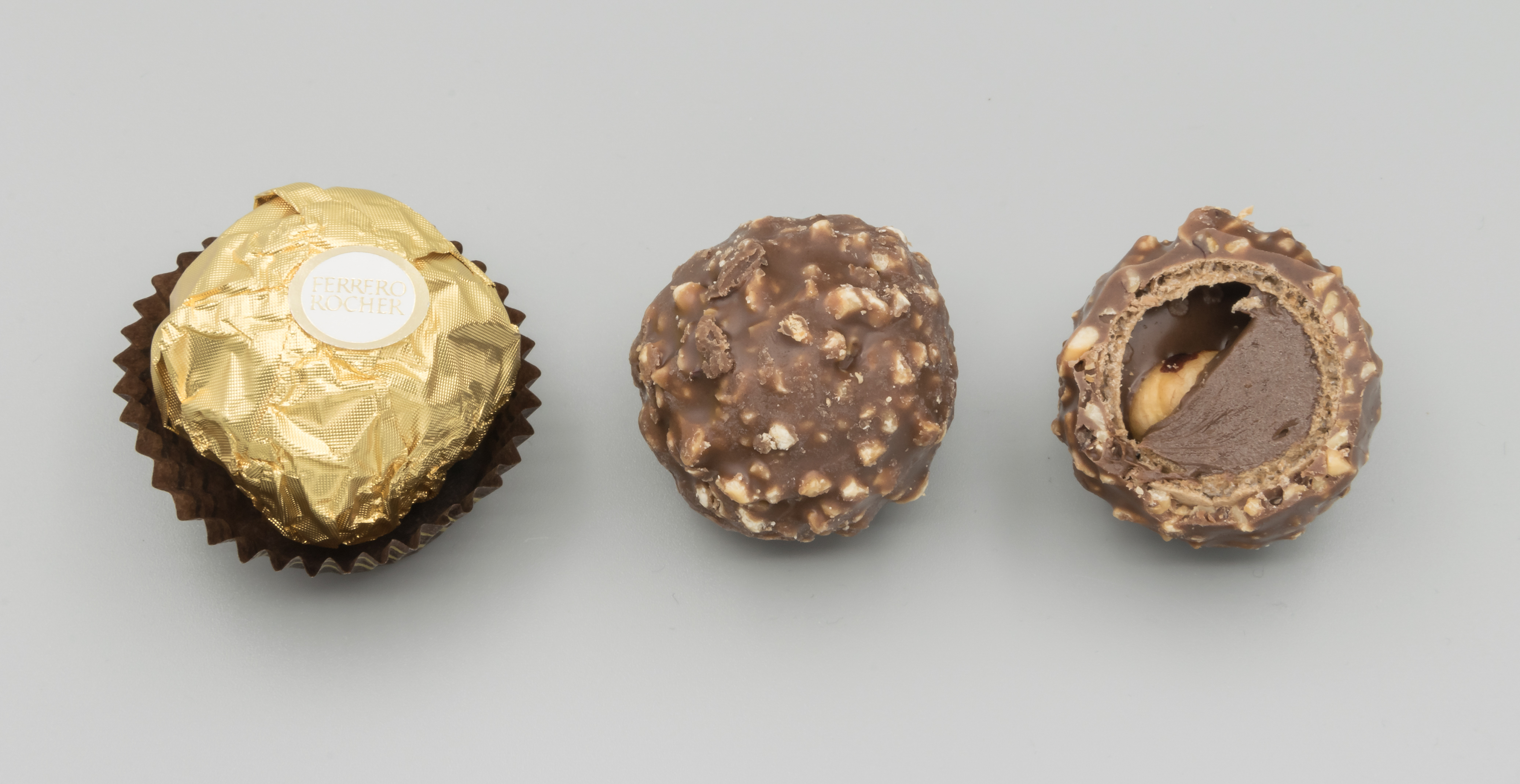
- Product type: Bonbon
- Current owner: Ferrero SpA
- Country: Italy
- Introduced: 1982; 44 years ago
- Related brands: Michele Ferrero in Italy
- Markets: Worldwide (more than 170 countries)
- Tagline: "The golden experience" "An irresistible taste experience."
- Website: ferrerorocher.com

Ferrero Rocher (UK: /fəˌrɛəroʊ ˈrɒʃeɪ/ fə-RAIR-oh ROSH-ay, US: /- roʊˈʃeɪ/ - roh-SHAY, Italian: [ferˈrɛːro roʃˈʃe]; stylized in all caps) is an Italian brand of chocolate and hazelnut confection manufactured by the Italian company Ferrero. Created by Michele Ferrero in 1979, each Ferrero Rocher ball is covered in foil and placed into a paper liner. The confection is machine-made and much of its production process is kept secret. It is sold worldwide and is culturally associated with Christmas.

== History ==
Ferrero Rocher was introduced in 1979 in Italy and in other parts of Europe in 1982. Michele Ferrero, the credited inventor, named the chocolate after a grotto in the Roman Catholic shrine of Lourdes, Rocher de Massabielle. Rocher comes from French and means 'rock' or 'boulder'.

== Ingredients ==
The chocolate consists of a whole roasted hazelnut encased in a thin wafer shell filled with hazelnut chocolate and covered in milk chocolate and chopped hazelnuts. Its ingredients are milk chocolate, sugar, cocoa butter, cocoa mass, skim milk powder, butteroil, lecithin as emulsifier (soy), vanillin (artificial flavor), hazelnuts, palm oil, wheat flour, whey (milk), low fat cocoa powder, sodium bicarbonate (leavening agent), and salt.

== Production ==
The production process is a secret, and no smartphones or notebooks are allowed inside the production facilities. As of 2015, few journalists have ever been invited to visit. As of 2015, the production in the Alba factory totals 24 million Ferrero Rochers a day.

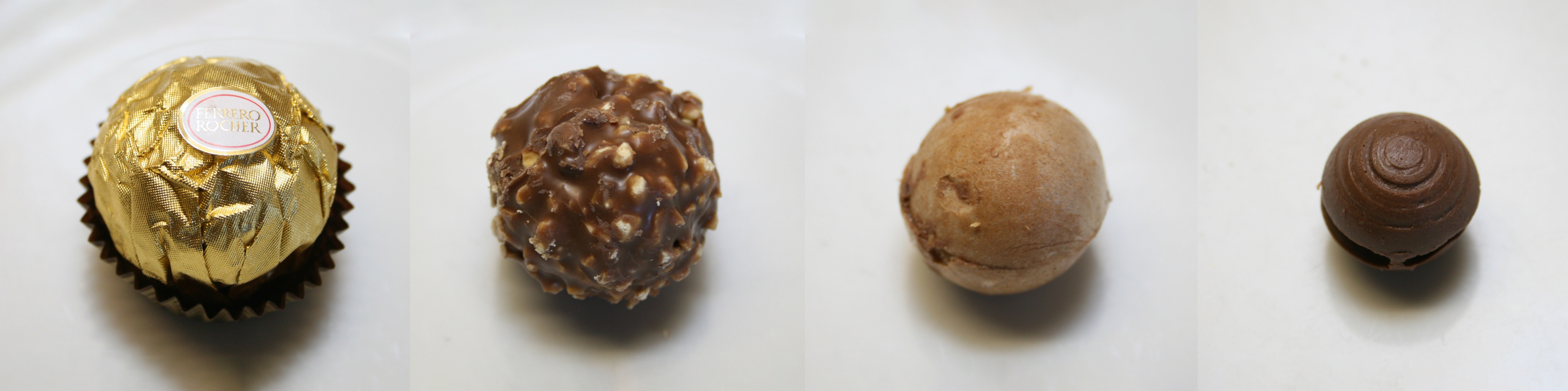
Layer-by-layer comparison of the Ferrero Rocher

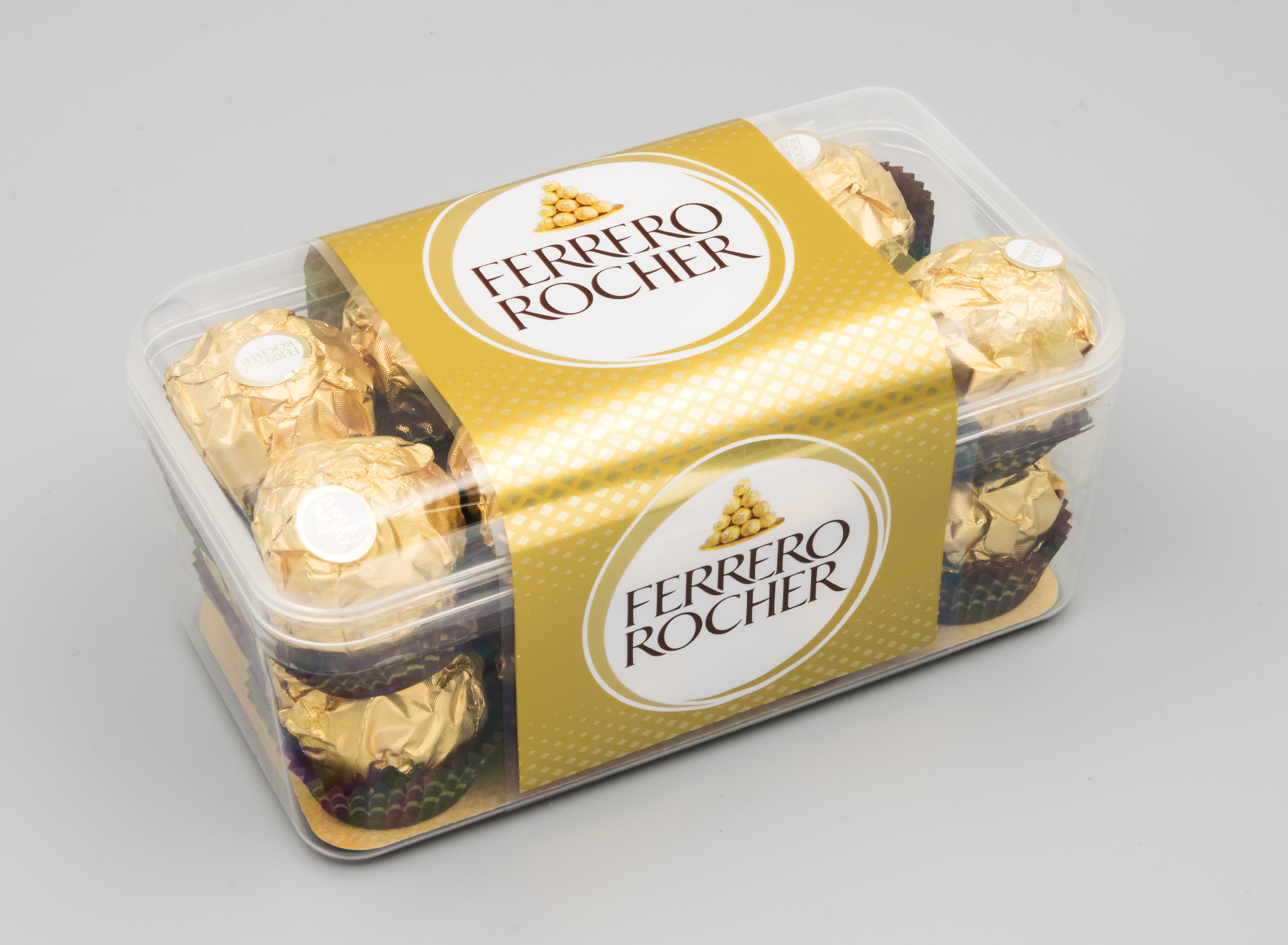
Box of Ferrero Rocher bonbons

The mechanised production process begins with flat sheets of wafer with hemispheres moving down an assembly line. The hemispheres of the wafers are then filled with a chocolate hazelnut cream. Next, two of these wafer sheets—one with a hazelnut and one with hazelnut chocolate creme—are clamped together. The excess wafer is cut away, producing wafer balls. These are then coated with a layer of chocolate, a layer of chopped hazelnuts, and a final layer of milk chocolate before the chocolate ball is wrapped in gold-coloured foil.

== Cultural impact ==
=== Christmas ===
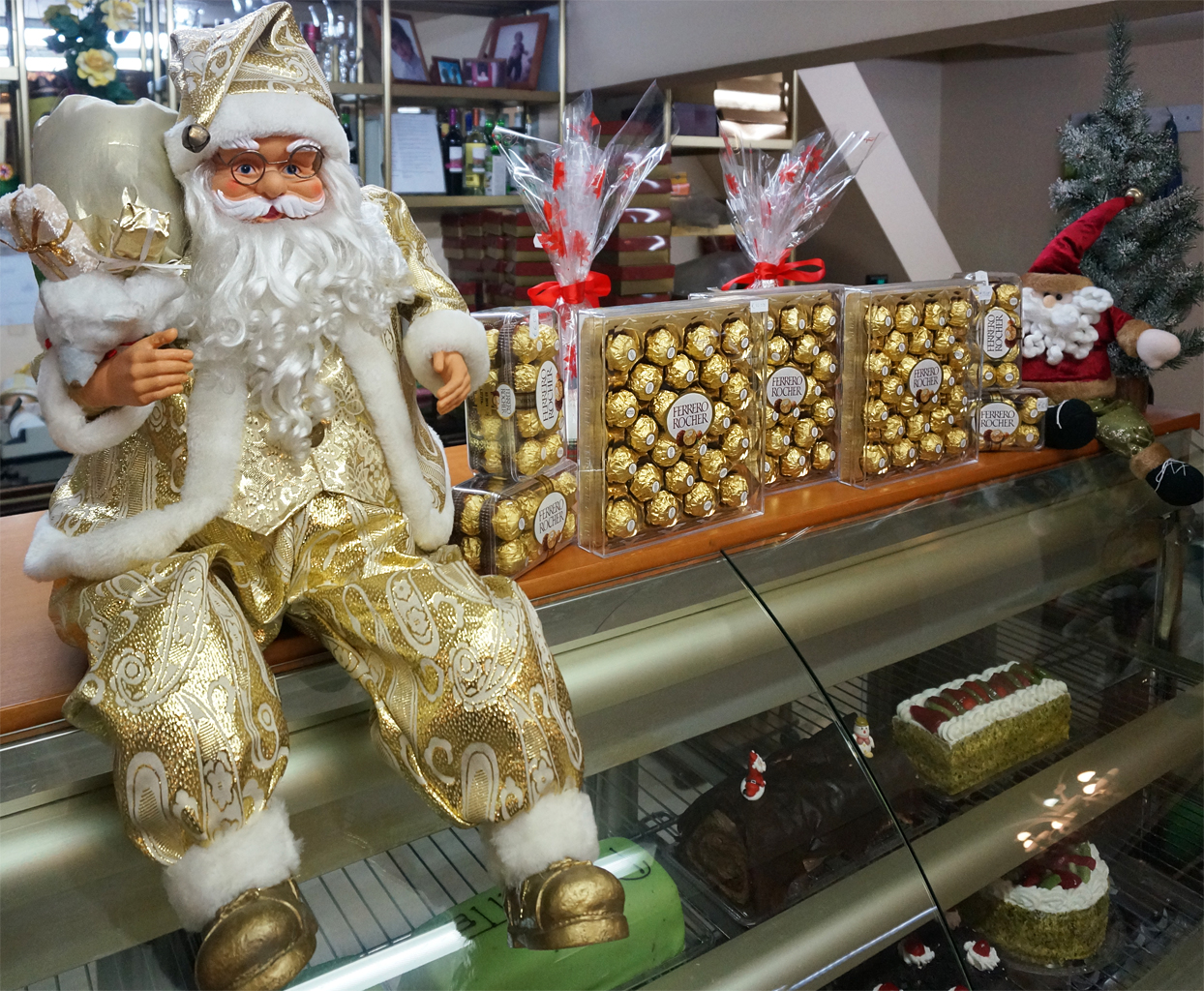
Ferrero Rochers in 24-pack boxes being sold during the Christmas season

Ferrero Rochers are associated with the holiday season during Christmas and New Year. As of 2015, 62% of Ferrero Rochers were sold within the last three months of the year.

=== 1990s advertisement ===
The brand is known in the United Kingdom, and other countries such as Mexico, by the popular 1990s "ambassadors" advertisement. It was based upon a party in a European ambassador's official residence, with the chocolates arranged into a pyramid and portrayed as a sophisticated treat. The advertisement has been repeatedly parodied in popular culture since. In 2000, the ambassador's party commercial was ranked 21st in Channel 4's poll of "The 100 Greatest TV Ads".

=== Immigrant communities ===
Ferrero Rocher is popular among immigrant communities in the United States due to its relatively low price compared with other luxury goods, along with its upscale appearance and marketing. Before Ferrero Rocher was available in mainland China, it was a popular gift from people in Hong Kong, who nicknamed Rocher "gold sand", to people on the mainland around Chinese New Year.

=== Knockoffs and counterfeits ===
In 2017, police made several arrests and seized 300,000 pieces of counterfeit Rocher which had been produced in a factory in Wuhu. Ferrero had spent US$1 million and five years fighting Chinese firm Montresor, whose "Tresor Dore" chocolates were priced at one-third of the cost of the genuine Rocher; an April 2008 court ruling had previously ordered Montresor to cease production.

== See also ==
- Environmental impact of cocoa production
- Gianduiotto
- Gianduja (chocolate)
