= Nocilla =

Food spread

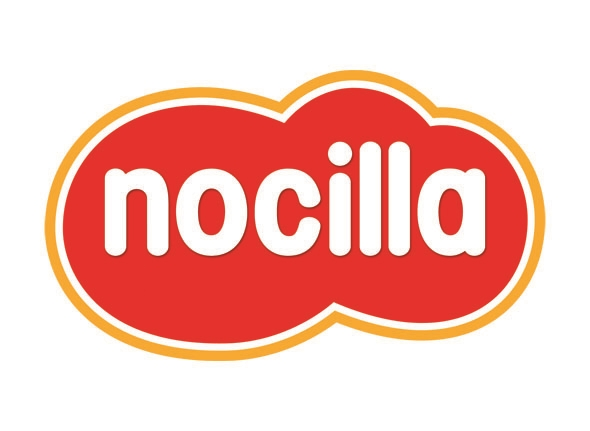
- Type: Spread
- Place of origin: Spain
- Main ingredients: Sugar (56%)

Nocilla is a Spanish brand of hazelnut and chocolate spread similar to Nutella, sold in Spain and Portugal. It was first launched in the late 1960s, and after its acquisition from Unilever in 2002 was manufactured by Nutrexpa.

== Slogan ==
Leche, cacao, avellanas y azúcar... ¡¡No-ci-lla!!: "Milk, cocoa, hazelnuts and sugar... No-ci-lla!!"

== History ==
At the end of 1967, the Starlux group was inspired by a product of the Italian Ferrero group, the Nutella spreadable cream, to develop its own product for the Spanish market. Nocilla though has a third less hazelnut paste than Nutella. Nocilla's first slogan was ¡Qué snack! To make itself known among young people, Nocilla sponsored sports camps, children's events and bet heavily on advertising. In this way, Nocilla positioned itself as the main brand in its sector.

In 1997, Starlux shareholders sold the firm to the American group CPC International, the maker of Knorr products. Nocilla subsequently passed to the Anglo-Dutch multinational Unilever, which acquired CPC's successor company Bestfoods in 2000. Five years later, the owners sold the brand to Grupo Nutrexpa, known for being the manufacturer of Cola Cao. Under their management, Nocilla launched new flavors and other products, such as buns. After the division of Nutrexpa into two companies in 2014 and the distribution of the products of the old Nutrexpa between the two new companies that began operating in 2015, Nocilla came under the ownership of Idilia Foods.

== See also ==
- List of spreads
- Nocilla Generation
