= Thórisson =

Thórisson or Þórisson is an Icelandic surname. Notable people with the name include:

- Andrea Thorisson (born 1998), Icelandic-Swedish footballer who plays for Peru
- Bergur Þórisson (born 1993), Icelandic musician, composer, audio engineer
- Guðmann Þórisson (born 1987), Icelandic football player
- Kristinn R. Thórisson, Icelandic artificial intelligence researcher

== See also ==
- Thoresen
- Thoreson
- Thoresson
- Þórarinsson
