= Thorsson =

Thorsson may refer to:

- Amund Thorsson
- Bjarni Haukur Thorsson (born 1971), Icelandic director, writer, producer, and actor
- Edred Thorsson (born 1953), American runologist, university lecturer and occultist
- Fredrik Vilhelm Thorsson (1865–1925), Swedish politician
- Guðmundur Andri Thorsson (born 1957), Icelandic editor, critic, and author
- Inga Thorsson (1915–1994), Swedish politician and diplomat
- Leif Thorsson (born 1945), Swedish jurist, judge in the Supreme Court of Sweden since 1993
- Marteinn Thorsson, director of Stormland
- Pierre Thorsson (born 1966), Swedish handball player who competed in three Summer Olympics
- Torbjörn Thorsson (born 1959), Swedish canoeist
- Willum Thor Thorsson (born 1963), Icelandic football manager and politician

== See also ==
- Thorson
