= Ruth Rogers-Altmann =

Painter and fashion designer (1917–2015)

- Born: Ruth Karplus; December 31, 1917; Vienna, Austria-Hungary
- Died: October 11, 2015 (aged 97); Murray Hill, Manhattan
- Occupations: Painter, fashion designer
- Relatives: Arnold Karplus (father) Bernhard Altmann (father in law) Maria Altmann (cousin)

Ruth Rogers-Altmann (December 31, 1917 – October 11, 2015) was a Vienna-born painter and fashion designer once called "The Pioneer Sportswear Icon of New York" by The Leo Baeck Institute. She is the mother of former editorial director of Abbeville Press Susan Costello Friedman, and sculptor Victoria Thorson.

== Life ==
Rogers-Altmann is the daughter of Arnold Karplus, a well-known architect of Red Vienna, and his wife Else. From 1933 to 1938 they lived in the Steiner House in Vienna's 13th district, Hietzing, designed in 1910 by Adolf Loos for Lilly and Hugo Steiner, who lived here until 1927 when they moved to Paris. At a young age Ruth studied dance, directing and music at the Kunstakademie and performed professionally in Vienna. Her fine arts training began at the Frauenakademie and continued at the Kunstgewerbeschule as a student of professor Albert Paris Gütersloh, a well-known exponent of Jugendstil (Art Nouveau). Her fashion training was under professor Wimer, an international authority in the fashion world. Her passion for spontaneity of performance, rhythm in dance, and artists of her period like Schiele, Kokoschka and Klimt – as well as Picasso, in some of her later African-themed work – are continuing influences in her painting. She was an enthusiastic skier up until she was 90 years old, learning to ski at the Mathias Zdarsky school of skiing, where the one-pole method was taught. Due to the notoriety of her father, Rogers-Altmann had many contacts with architects and artists throughout her childhood and youth.

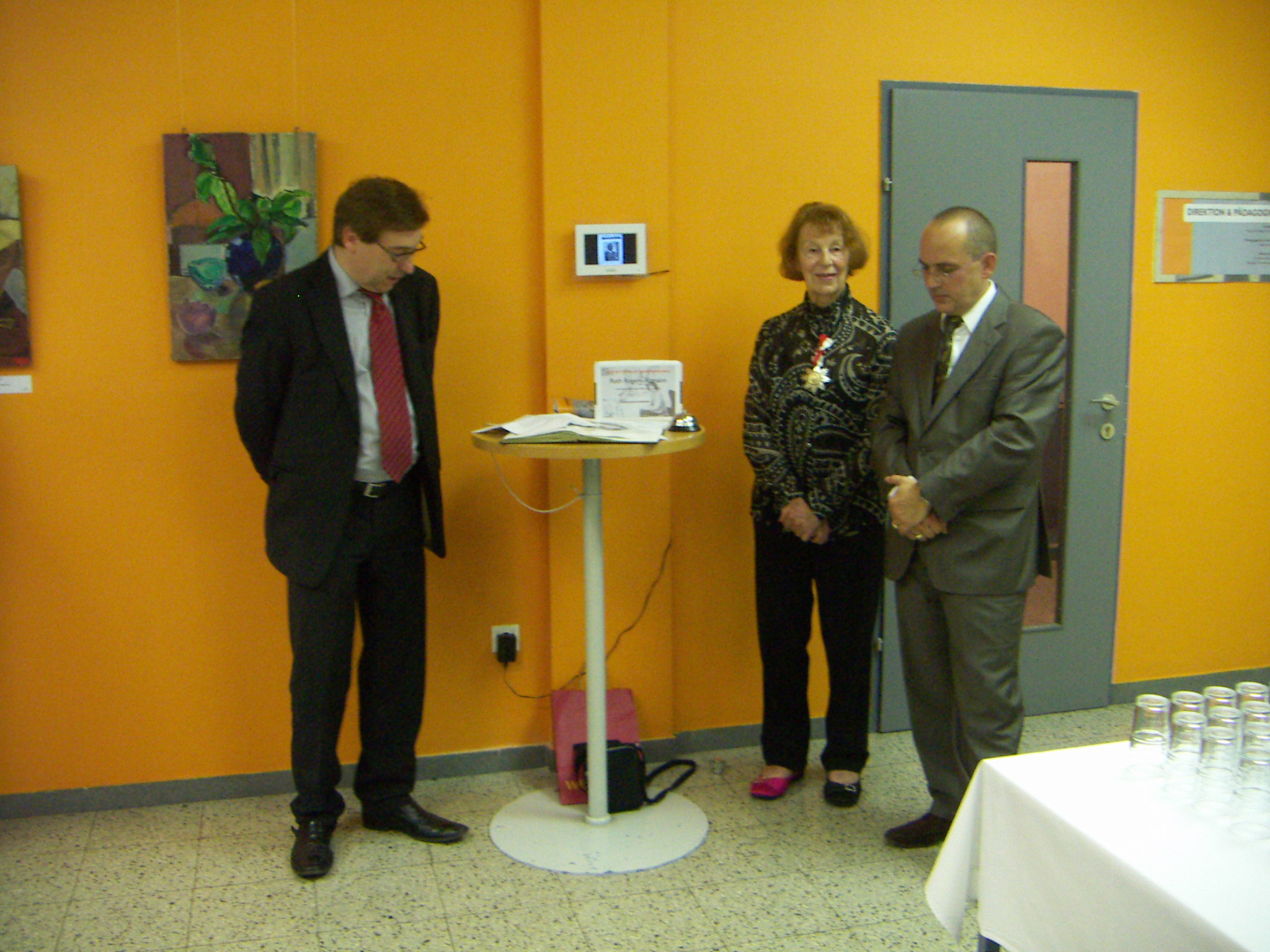
Kurt Stürzenbecher, Ruth Rogers-Altmann, and Robert Streibel at Retrospective 2008, VHS Hietzing

Visiting Prague for her grandmother's birthday in March 1938, she learned that the Anschluss was imminent. Instead of returning to Vienna she fled to New York. Shortly thereafter her immediate family emigrated to New York, except for her brother Hans, who went to Caracas.

Ruth Karplus became Ruth Rogers when she married Dr. Martin Rogers in September, 1938. Later in life, in 1967, she married Hans Carl Altmann, the first son of the textile magnate Bernhard Altmann, whose family, like hers, had to flee from Vienna after the Nazi takeover. Rogers-Altmann is the cousin, by way of marriage, of Austrian Jewish refugee Maria Altmann.

Rogers-Altmann lived in the Roosevelt Island section of Manhattan when she first moved to New York and moved to Murray Hill, Manhattan where she lived out the rest of her life.

== Skiing/Fashion ==
Arriving in New York with the wave of European artists during World War II, Rogers-Altmann gravitated to painters of the New York School. She quickly established herself as a leading skiwear designer. Beginning her fashion career as a stylist with Herzmansky, Vienna's largest department store, she subsequently launched Bloomingdale's first skiwear center, introduced to America a never-before-seen stretch fabric for ski pants she discovered while in Paris, designed the first ski jacket that had a concealed hood built into the collar in 1938, and in 1951 founded Ruth Rogers Enterprises (RRE), a management consulting service for apparel manufacturers specializing in design and styling.

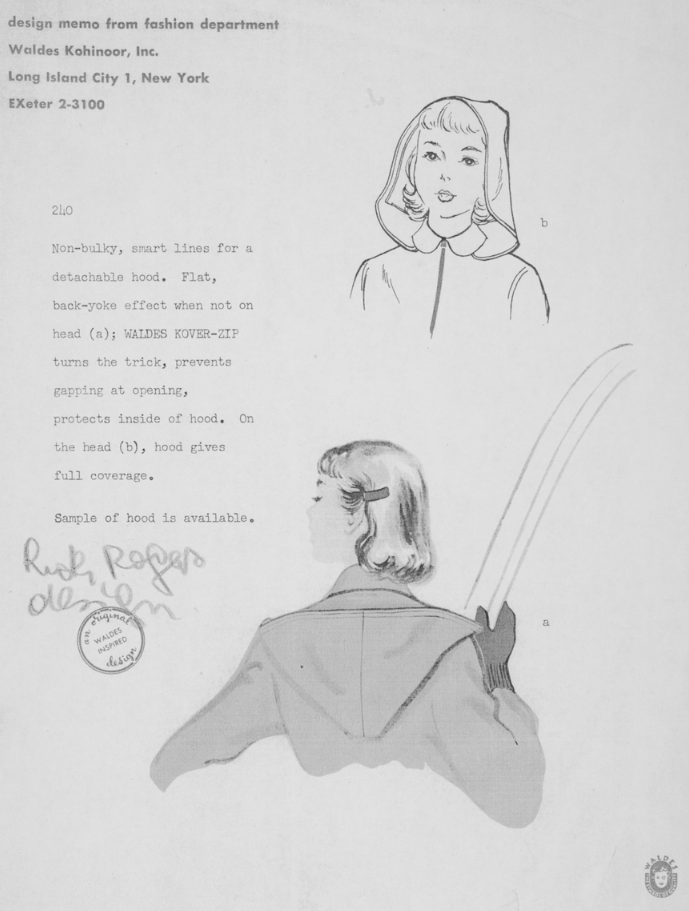
Skiwear Sketches by Rogers-Altmann, 1951

An expert skier herself, in 1998 at the age of 81 she competed in the Gerald Ford American Ski Classic, where she faced an opponent in her twenties – and won.

She is a longtime devotee of Alta Ski Area, having assisted with the surveying of the Albion-Sugarloaf area with Alta notables James Laughlin, Chic Morton and Alf Engen, and, because of the tremendous avalanche danger in the Alta area, aided in the completion of a forest service questionnaire for Swiss avalanche expert Dr. André Roche.

In 1989 during Alta's 50th anniversary celebration, Rogers-Altmann exhibited her paintings of winter scenes at Atla at the Alta Peruvian's Alf Engen Room. A portion of the proceeds from the sale of paintings was donated to the fundraiser for the Community Center under construction at the time.

Rogers-Altmann also served for more than a decade as a Special Consultant to the Costume Institute of the Metropolitan Museum of Art in New York City, and was a lecturer at Parsons the New School for Design, Fashion Institute of Technology, Wood Tobe-Coburn School of Fashion Merchandising, and Shenkar College of Engineering and Design in Tel Aviv.

Rogers-Altmann's color key cast books for Burlington Industries can be found in the Smithsonian Institution Libraries.

== Painting ==
As a painter Rogers-Altmann works on location, and alternates beach scenes in the Hamptons, the Algarve in Portugal, and farm scenes in County Cork, Ireland with ski scenes in the Swiss Alps, the Andes in Argentina, the Tasman Glacier in New Zealand and the Rockies in Utah.

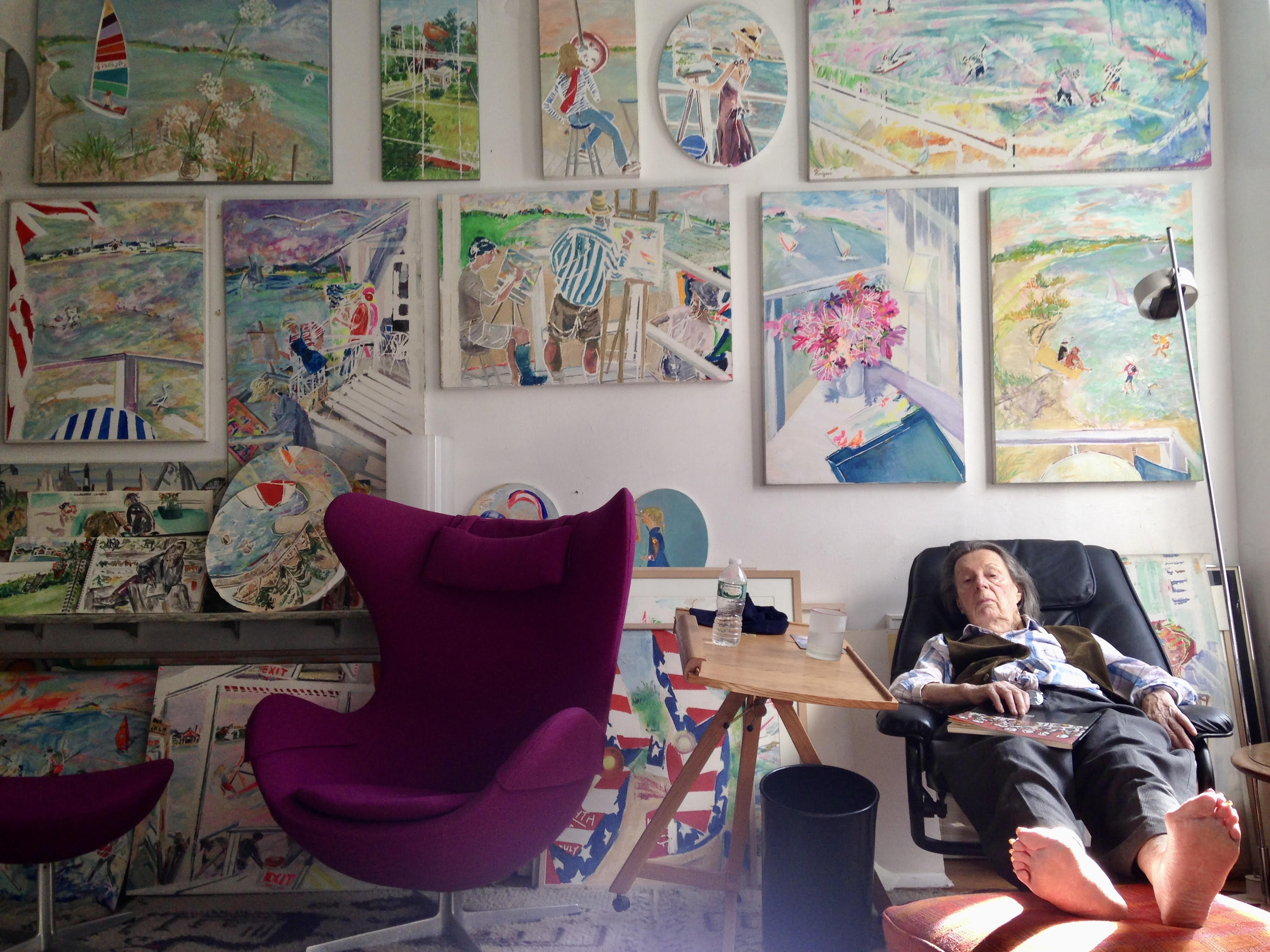
Rogers-Altmann in her Murray Hill, Manhattan living room in May, 2015

Rogers-Altmann paints using a method she calls "The Tape Method": she paints over strips of tape and then removes them, creating unique borders and structure to the composition. Her paintings show a combination of symbolism and abstraction, and define a rhythmic dance of choreographed vivid color hues. Her development of a technique called "coloramic vibrant hues and circle symbol" began in the late 1940s when she worked with Lee Gatch, who had studied with the Cubist Andre Lhote and other School of Paris artists of the 1920s. Her works have been shown internationally, including The Hamptons art fixture Elaine Benson Gallery, the Brownstone Gallery, the Sonnenburg Gallery in Oberlech, and are seen at Florence Moore Hall at Stanford University and at the Alf Engen Ski Museum at Utah Olympic Park.

“The people who buy my paintings tell me that they enjoy looking at them because they give them pleasure and inspiration and that the pictures make them feel happy. So that is my dividend, my best dividend, of the paintings I do. Not that they are unique in the way I paint or where color is one of my big strengths, but that they inspire and give pleasure to other people.”

== Awards/Press ==
- 1987–1990: Special Inclusion in Marquis' Who's Who of American Women.
- 1994: Featured in the Austrian Culture Forum New York's magazine Austria Kultur.
- 2001: Silver medal of honor from the City of Vienna, Austria for outstanding achievement.
- 2002: Chosen as an honorary representative for the Austrian Heritage Collection at the Leo Baeck Institute, New York as part of their "Persecuting Grandfathers, Interviewing Grandsons" expose.
- 2004: Inducted as an Honorary Citizen of the Town of Alta by Mayor Bill Levitt, with a Certificate of Recognition that eulogized her for “dedicated and loyal service above and beyond the call of duty” to the Town of Alta.
- 2008: Life at Napeague Bay, 1999, oil on canvas (24x36 in, 60.5x91.2 cm), special selection from her 2008 Retrospective Volkshochschule Hietzing by the Collection at University of Applied Arts Vienna.
