= Thorson =

Thorson or Thorsen are Swedish, Norwegian and Danish surnames, and a first name in the Kadaru language. Notable people with the surname include:

== Thorson ==
- Brett Thorson (born 2000), Australian player of American football
- Charles Thorson (1890–1966), Canadian political cartoonist, character designer
- Celeste Thorson (born 1984), American actress, model writer, and activist.
- Clayton Thorson (born 1995), American football player
- Eric Thorson, American Inspector General for the United States Treasury Department.
- Gunnar Thorson (1906–1971), Danish marine zoologist and ecologist.
- Herman Thorson (1880–1960) American politician with the North Dakota Republican Party
- John F. Thorson (1920–1944) American soldier in the United States Army
- Joseph Thorarinn Thorson (1889–1978), Canadian lawyer and politician
- Karen L. Thorson, American television producer
- Kenneth Thorson (born 1966), Canadian Roman Catholic bishop
- Linda Thorson (born 1947), Canadian actress
- Maddy Thorson (born 1988), Canadian video game developer
- Mark Thorson (born 1983), American football player
- Scott Thorson (1959–2024), American who became famous for his relationship with Liberace
- Tanner Thorson (born 1996), American racing driver
- Theodore W. Thorson (1922–2018), American educator and politician
- Victoria Thorson (born 1943), American sculptor and art historian
- William Thorson (born c. 1983), Swedish professional poker player

== Thorsen ==
- Eric Thorsen (born 1967), American sculptor
- Finn Thorsen (born 1940), Norwegian footballer
- Jan Einar Thorsen (born 1966), Norwegian Olympic alpine skier
- Jens Jørgen Thorsen (1932–2002), Danish artist
- Kjetil Trædal Thorsen (born 1958), Norwegian professor
- Øyvind Thorsen (1943–2025), Norwegian journalist, and author
- Sven-Ole Thorsen (born 1944), Danish actor, stuntman, and athlete
- Thea Selliaas Thorsen (born 1974) Norwegian classicist
- Vegard Thorsen, Norwegian heavy metal guitarist

== See also ==
- Thorsen House (c. 1909), in Berkeley, California
- Thorson's rule, a rule which states that benthic marine invertebrates produce large numbers of eggs at low latitudes and produce fewer and larger eggs at high latitudes
- Thoresen, a surname
