= Kinder (brand) =

Italian candy brand

- Current owner: Ferrero SpA
- Country: Italy
- Introduced: 24 October 1968; 58 years ago (Kinder Chocolate)
- Website: kinder.com

Kinder (pronounced [ˈkɪndɐ]; German for "children") is an Italian brand of chocolate produced by Italian multinational confectionery company Ferrero. Products under the Kinder brand include several varieties and are sold in over 170 countries worldwide.

== Products ==
=== Chocolate bars ===
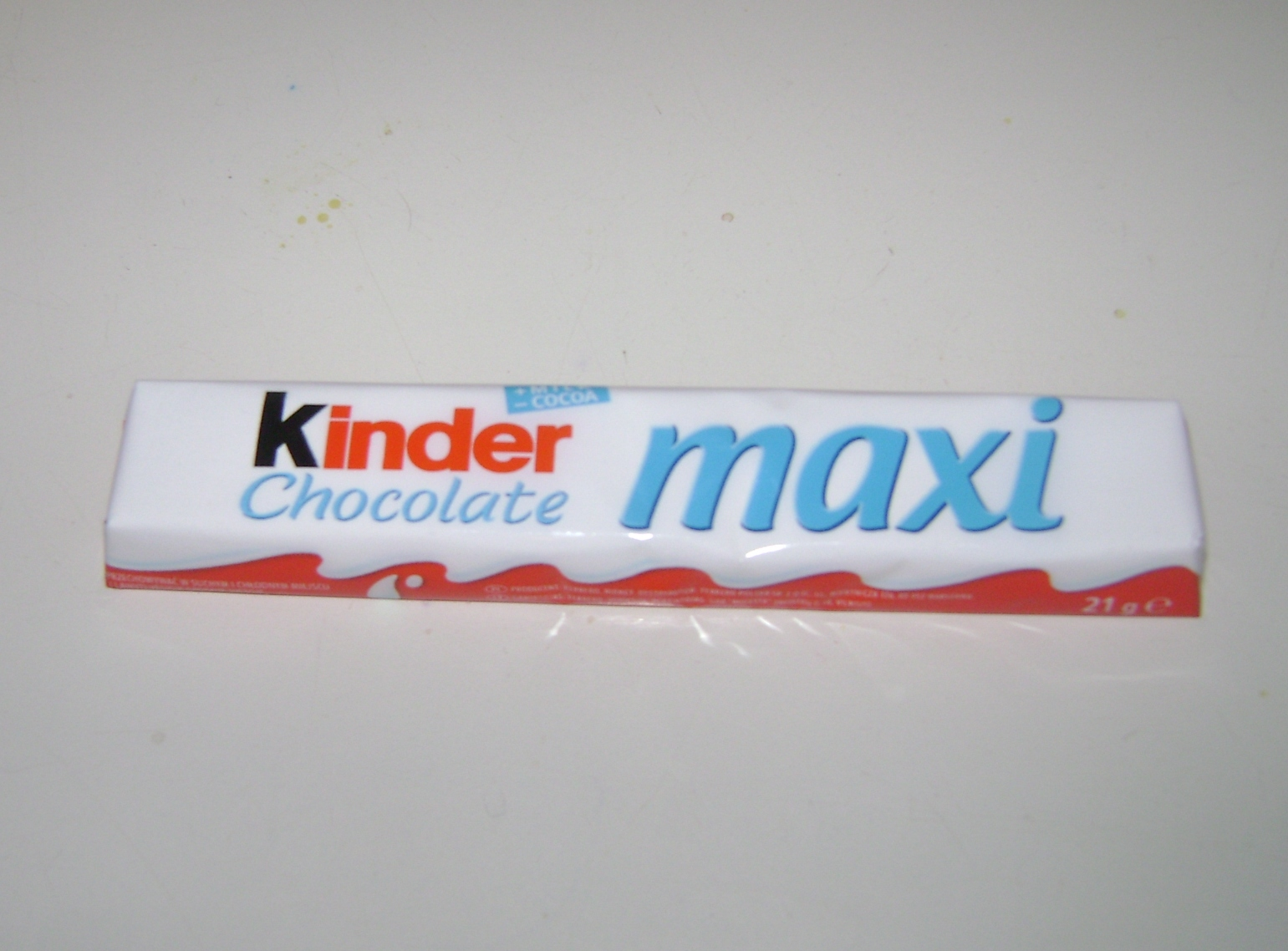
Kinder Maxi chocolate bar

- Kinder Chocolate – milk chocolate bars.
- Kinder Maxi – a larger version of the Kinder Chocolate.
- Kinder Bueno – set of two chocolate wafer bars containing a hazelnut cream filling. It was released in Italy in 1990. Kinder introduced a white chocolate version of Bueno in 1999. 2017 saw the release of the coconut and dark chocolate variants of the Kinder Bueno.
- Kinder ChocoFresh – two-layered chocolate bar. In the bottom is a layer of hazelnut cream, then a whipped cream base, then coated with chocolate.

=== Chocolate confections ===
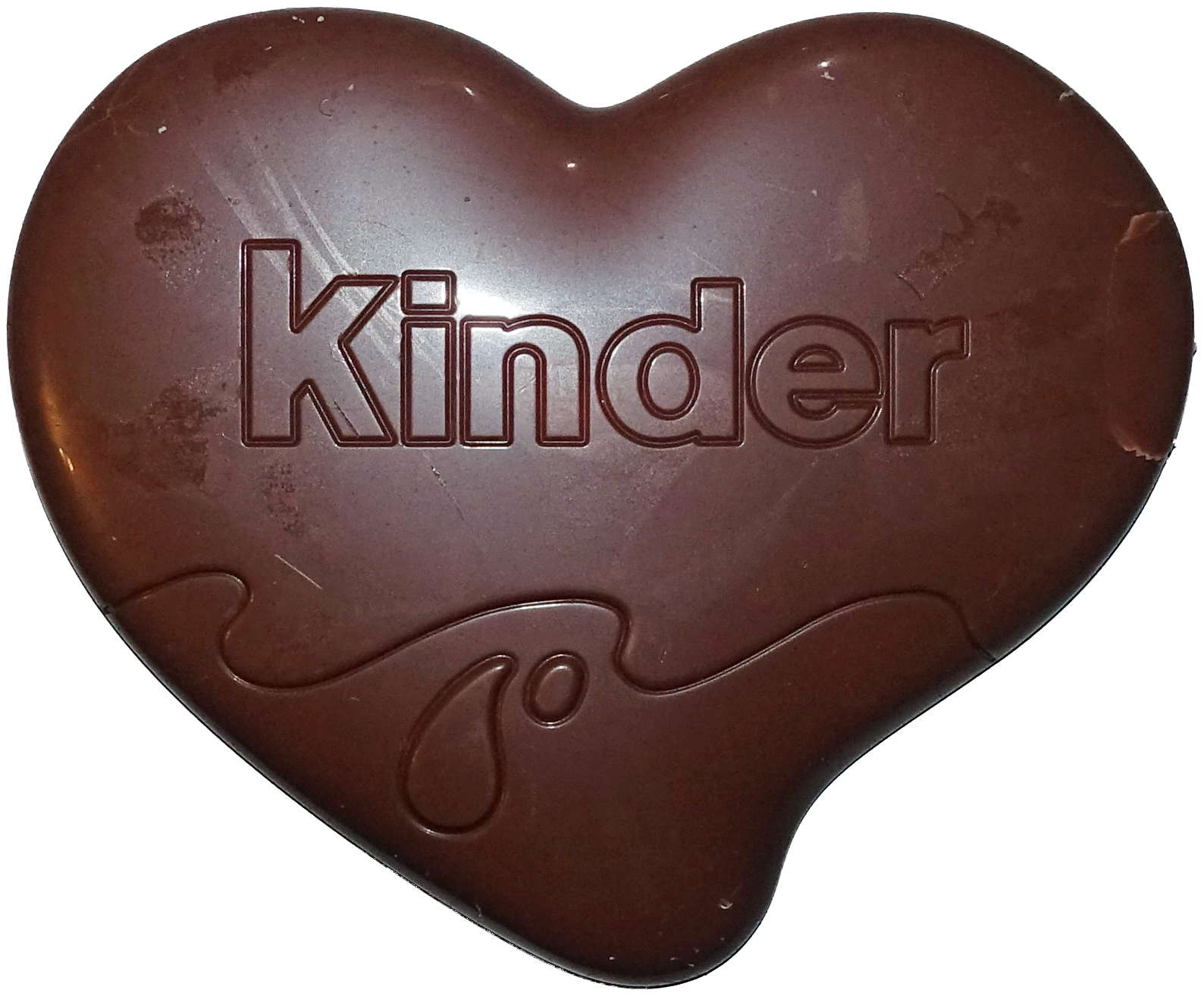
Kinder chocolate heart

- Kinder advent calendars and Christmas stockings are sold during the Christmas season.
  - There are DC Super Hero Girls-themed and Jurassic World-themed Kinder stockings.
- Kinder heart-shaped products are sold during the Valentine's Day season.

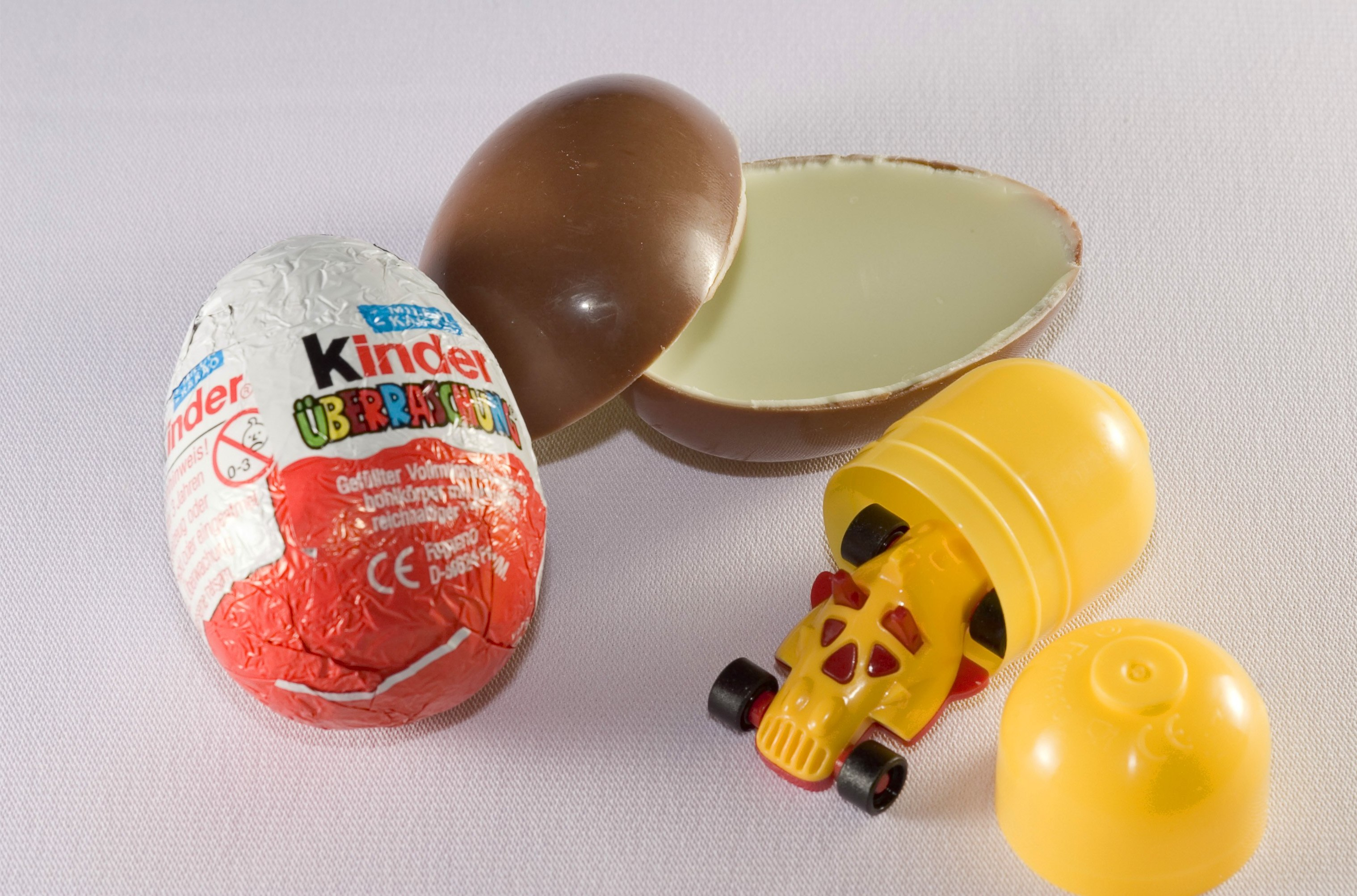
Kinder Surprise egg with toy

- Kinder Surprise – hollow milk chocolate egg shell containing a toy. The outside surface of the egg is milk chocolate, and the inside is a milky interior. A capsule containing a toy is inside the chocolate egg.
- Kinder Joy – similar in shape to the Kinder Surprise, it has a plastic egg-shaped packaging that is internally divided into two halves. One half contains two soft creamy chocolate layers, one milk chocolate-flavoured, one white chocolate-flavoured, which are eaten with an included spoon. Embedded in the ganache are two round, chocolate-covered wafers. The other half contains a small toy.

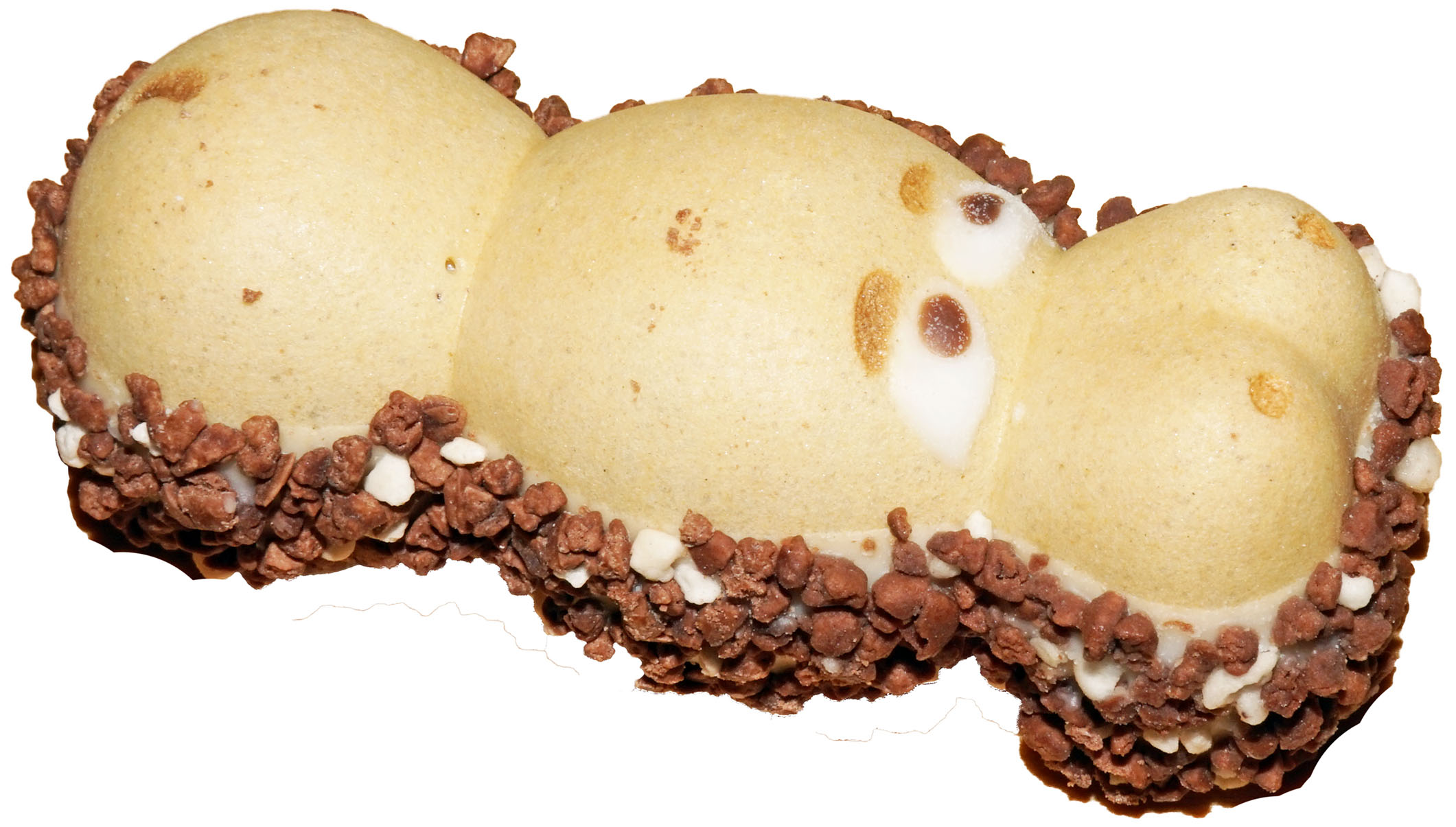
Kinder Happy Hippo

- Happy Hippos – wafer coated hippo-shaped biscuit, filled with both a white filling and a hazelnut filling. Happy Hippos are also available in Chocolate flavour.
- Kinder Delice – chocolate cake with a layer of milk inside and a milk chocolate covering. The Kinder Delice brand has a commemorative variety which features ovos moles (Portuguese for "soft eggs") which is specific to the city of Aveiro, Portugal.
- Kinder Pingui – similar to Kinder Delice with the exception of a complete chocolate covering and more milky filling inside.
- Milky Bites, known in the UK and parts of Europe as Choco Bons – small milk chocolate eggs, with a hazelnut and white chocolate filling.
- Country Crisp – similar to the Kinder Chocolate, containing small pieces of cereal and grain within the chocolate filling, as well as a wafer casing. It is also known under the name 'Kinder Country' and 'Kinder Cereali'.
- Kinder Crispy – two wafers with cream and chocolate each side of a chocolate wafer encased in milk chocolate topped with hazelnuts.
- Kinder Maxi King – milk cake with a layer of caramel inside and a hazelnut chocolate covering.
- Kinder Paradiso – slightly lemon-flavoured sponge cake, with a creamy milk filling in between and powdered sugar on the top.
- Kinder Milk Slice – chocolate sponge cake that has a creamy, milky filling in the middle.
- Kinder Yogurt Slice – sponge cake that has yogurt cream inside it, and there is yogurt inside the yogurt cream. It has a slight lemon flavour.
- Kinder Cards – biscuits with chocolate on top and creamy milk and cocoa fillings.
- Kinder Brioss – sponge cake with milk chocolate on the top and a milky filling.
- Kinder Breakfast Plus – sponge cake with five cereals inside it with malt on the top and cocoa on the inside.
- Kinder Pan and Choc – sponge cake that also has chocolate sponge cake with a cocoa filling.
- Kinder CereAlé – cereal bar with strawberry and cream fillings, it was created at Expo 2015.
- Kinder Tronky – biscuit which combines layers of milky cream, biscuit crumbles and chocolate with a cocoa wafer finish. It was introduced in 2023.
- Kinder Kinderini – biscuits shaped like heads of children.

== Volleyball sponsorships ==
Kinder sponsors the Spanish, Italian and Portuguese national volleyball teams.
