= Thoresson =

Thoresson is a Swedish surname. Notable people with the surname include:

- Torbjörn Thoresson (born 1959), Swedish sprint canoer
- William Thoresson (1932–2026), Swedish gymnast

== See also ==
- Thoreson
- Thorsson
