= Karplus =

Karplus is a surname. Notable people with the surname include:

- Arnold Karplus (1877–1968), Czech-Austrian architect
- Kevin Karplus (born 1954), American academic
  - Karplus-Strong string synthesis
- Martin Karplus (1930–2024), American theoretical chemist and 2013 Nobel Laureate (Chemistry)
  - Karplus equation
- Robert Karplus (1927–1990), American theoretical physicist and educator
