= Kinder Pingui =

Frozen confectionary product

Nutritional Info
Nutritional value per 100 g (3.5 oz)
- Energy: 1,873 kJ (448 kcal)
- Carbohydrates: 37.8 g
- Fat: 29.7 g
- Protein: 7 g
Vitamins and minerals
| Minerals | Quantity %DV^{†} |
| Sodium | 0% 0.254 mg |
- ^{†}Percentages estimated using US recommendations for adults.

Kinder Pinguí is a confectionery product from the Italian company Ferrero as part of its Kinder brand of products.

It is a chocolate bar made from a light milk preparation with a coating and a separating layer made of chocolate. With a weight of 30 grams, it contains 9.9 grams of sugar and 8.9 grams of fat The addition of alcohol to various Kinder products (Kinder Maxi King, Milch Schnitte, Kinder Pinguí) was stopped by Ferrero in mid-2000 by changing the recipe. The target group of the product are mainly families with children. In 2004, 48 percent of all 6 to 13-year-olds in Germany ate at least one Kinder Pinguí per week.

As with other products in the Kinder brand family (Kinder Chocolate, Happy Hippo, Milch-Schnitte), Ferrero tries to emphasize the milk content of the product in its advertising as a nutritionally positive property. The physiological calorific value of Kinder Pinguí is approx. 1,870 kJ/100 g (450 kcal/100 g) and is therefore somewhat lower than that of Happy Hippo or Kinder Bueno. Nevertheless, in a study for the German Federal Ministry of Consumer Protection, in 2005, the "Kinder Pinguí" advertisement was criticized as trivializing. The milk content consists largely of butterfat and skimmed milk powder, which corresponds to about one teaspoon (5 grams) in a Kinder Pinguí bar. The "Kinder Pinguí" advert also works with child-friendly advertising material such as a penguin as a figure of identification, but it is aimed more at the parents as a target audience. In addition to the argumentative aspect of nutritional value, enjoyment and convenience for parents are also promised, for example, in a spot in which a mother first allows her child and then herself a Pinguí and in this way, she can easily fulfil her care obligations and enjoy herself. Marketing wise this puts the product between Kinder chocolate and Milch-Schnitte on the one hand, whose advertising is primarily aimed at adults, and Happy Hippo on the other hand, which is primarily aimed at children in the design of the product itself (a waffle in the shape of a hippopotamus).

Occasionally, the variant Kinder Pinguí Strawberry and Raspberry were also available for a short time. Since 2018, the varieties Cocos and Caramel have also been part of the permanent range. In 2004, Ferrero's commercial was the third most frequently broadcast commercial on German television with 3,301 broadcasts.
