= Inga Thorsson =

Swedish politician (1915–1994)

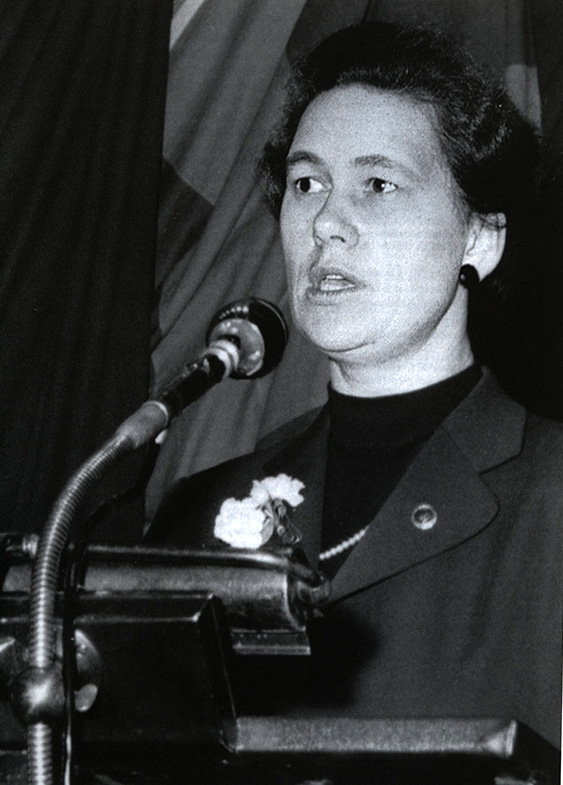
- Inga Thorsson delivers a speech during International Women's Day in March 1958

Delegate to the UN General Assembly
- In office 1966 and 1970–1982

Ambassador of Sweden to Israel
- In office 1964–1966
- Preceded by: Hugo Tamm
- Succeeded by: Bo Siegbahn

Member of the Second Chamber
- In office 1957–1958

Member of Parliament
- In office 1971–1977

Personal details
- Born: Inga Margarethe Sjöbäck; 3 July 1915; Malmö, Sweden
- Died: 15 January 1994 (aged 78); Stockholm, Sweden
- Political party: Social Democratic Party
- Spouse: Sture Thorsson (m. 1944; died 1979)
- Children: Leif Thorsson

Inga Margarethe Thorsson, née Sjöbäck (3 July 1915 – 15 January 1994) was a Swedish politician (Social Democrat). Thorsson held various significant roles throughout her career in both national and international spheres. She served as the secretary and later the chairperson of Social Democratic Women in Sweden, and held leadership positions in social welfare and foreign affairs. Thorsson was the Swedish ambassador to Israel from 1964 to 1966 and later directed the Social Development Division at the UN Centre for Social Development and Humanitarian Affairs. She also chaired multiple Swedish committees, including those related to health, environmental issues, and disarmament. Thorsson represented Sweden in the United Nations General Assembly and served as a delegate to several UN bodies, playing a key role in international disarmament and development initiatives. Her international influence extended to leadership roles in various UN committees and peace organizations, emphasizing her commitment to disarmament and global peace efforts.

== Early life ==
Thorsson was born on 3 July 1915 in Malmö, Sweden, the son of Eduard Sjöbäck and his wife Edith (née Bagger-Jörgensen). She passed studentexamen in 1933, attended the Royal Advanced Female Teachers' Seminary in 1936 and the Royal Central Gymnastics Institute in 1938.

== Career ==
=== Leadership Roles and Diplomatic Service ===
Thorsson was the secretary of the Co-operative Women's Guild Association (Kooperativa Kvinnogillesförbundet) from 1939 to 1940, in the Social Democratic Women in Sweden from 1940 to 1943, and in the 1941 population inquiry from 1943 to 1945. She was political secretary in the Social Democratic Women in Sweden from 1950 to 1952 and its chairperson from 1952 to 1964. Thorsson was commissioner (borgarråd) in the social welfare department from 1958 to 1962, and expert at the Ministry for Foreign Affairs from 1962 to 1963. She was then Swedish ambassador in Tel Aviv from 1964 to 1966, and had a special assignment at the Ministry for Foreign Affairs from 1966 to 1967. She was the director of the Centre for Social Development and Humanitarian Affairs's Social Development Division from 1967 to 1970, expert at the Ministry for Foreign Affairs from 1970 to 1973, and chairperson of the Swedish Institute in Stockholm from 1970 to 1973. Furthermore, Thorsson was the chief negotiator regarding international population and environmental issues from 1972 to 1975, and chairperson of the Swedish delegation at the Committee on Disarmament in Geneva from 1974 to 1982.

=== Chairmanship and membership ===
Thorsson was a member of the Stockholm City Council (Stockholms stadsfullmäktige) from 1950 to 1958, a member of the National Swedish Board of Health's Social Psychiatry Board (Medicinalstyrelsens socialpsykiatriska nämnd) from 1947 to 1952, the National Swedish Price Control Board (Statens priskontrollnämnd) from 1950 to 1956, the National Swedish Price and Cartel Office (Statens pris- och kartellnämnd) in 1957, the Swedish National Commission for UNESCO (Svenska Unescorådet) from 1954 to 1963, the Swedish Agency for International Assistance (Nämnden för internationellt bistånd) from 1962 to 1963, the delegation for international social policy cooperation from 1955 to 1958, the 1950 Abortion Inquiry from 1950 to 1953, the committee for reviewing health and medical care in Sweden from 1954 to 1963, the stabilization inquiry from 1955 to 1958, the mental health care delegation from 1955 to 1958 (chairman from 1957 to 1958), chairman of the family counseling committee from 1955 to 1957, government expert at the International Labour Organization in Geneva from 1950 to 1952, delegate to the United Nations General Assembly in 1966 and from 1970 to 1982, and to the United Nations Economic and Social Council in 1967 and from 1970 to 1972, and the United Nations Population Commission from 1972 to 1975.

Sha was a member of parliament for the Swedish Social Democratic Party from 1957 to 1958 and from 1971 to 1979, vice chairman of the hospital board (sjukhusdirektionen) from 1957 to 1958, member of the investigation on the costs of environmental protection from 1971 to 1973, delegate at the United Nations Conference on the Human Environment in 1972, chairman of the Swedish National Committee for United Nations world population conferences from 1972 to 1974, member of the Energy Program Committee from 1974 to 1975, delegation for energy research from 1975 to 1976, chairman of the board at the Secretariat for Future Studies from 1975 to 1976, board member from 1976 to 1980, special investigator on the link between disarmament and development from 1983 to 1985, and board member of the United Nations Institute for Training and Research (UNITAR) from 1973 to 1982.

Thorsson held several different international assignments, including president at the first Non-Proliferation Treaty Review Conference, chairman of the UN General Assembly Ad Hoc Committee on the Strengthening of the Role of the United Nations in the Field of Disarmament in New York City in 1976, chairman of the UN Group of Government Experts on the Relationship between Disarmament and Development, chairman of the UN Panel of Eminent Personalities in the Field of Disarmament and Development in 1986, member of the RIO Group (Reshaping the International Order) from 1974 to 1976, vice chairman of the RIO Foundation from 1976 to 1980, member of the executive committee of the International Foundation for Development Alternatives (IFDA) from 1975, board member of the Society for International Development from 1982 to 1988, chairman of the Great Peace Journey (Den Stora Fredsresan) from 1984 to 1989, Stockholm International Peace Research Institute from 1988 to 1991, and member of the Stockholm International Peace Research Institute's Scientific Council from 1992.

== Personal life ==
In 1944, she married social counsellor Sture Thorsson (1895–1979). Their son, Leif Thorsson (born 1945) was justice of the Supreme Court of Sweden from 1993 to 2012.

== Awards and honours ==
- (Sweden) H. M. The King's Medal, 12th size gold (silver-gilt) medal worn around the neck on the Order of the Seraphim ribbon (1990)
- Honorary Doctor of Philosophy, University of Gothenburg (1987)

Diplomatic posts
Preceded by Hugo Tamm	Ambassador of Sweden to Israel; 1964–1966	Succeeded by Bo Siegbahn
