= Gunnar Thorson =

Danish marine zoologist and ecologist

Gunnar Axel Wright Thorson (31 December 1906 – 25 January 1971) was a Danish marine zoologist and ecologist, who studied at the University of Copenhagen under the professors C.G. Johannes Petersen, August Krogh, Theodor Mortensen, Ragnar Spärck and Carl Wesenberg-Lund. In 1957, Thorson was appointed professor of marine biology at the University of Copenhagen.

Thorson studied planktonic larvae of marine benthic invertebrates. He conceived the idea that in the Tropics, benthos tend to produce large numbers of eggs developing into pelagic and widely dispersing larvae, whereas at higher latitudes they tend to produce fewer and larger eggs and offspring. This idea was later coined Thorson's rule.

Thorson participated in the Three-year Expedition to East Greenland led by Lauge Koch. He founded the Marine Biological Laboratory under the University of Copenhagen and was a professor there 1958–1968.

The icebreaker HDMS Gunnar Thorson was named after him.
