= Rapoport's rule =

Ecogeographical principle

Rapoport's rule is an ecogeographical rule that states that latitudinal ranges of plants and animals are generally smaller at lower latitudes than at higher latitudes.

== Background ==
Stevens (1989) named the rule after Eduardo H. Rapoport, who had earlier provided evidence for the phenomenon for subspecies of mammals (Rapoport 1975, 1982). Stevens used the rule to "explain" greater species diversity in the tropics in the sense that latitudinal gradients in species diversity and the rule have identical exceptional data and so must have the same underlying cause. Narrower ranges in the tropics would facilitate more species to coexist. He later extended the rule to altitudinal gradients, claiming that altitudinal ranges are greatest at greater latitudes (Stevens 1992), and to depth gradients in the oceans (Stevens 1996). The rule has been the focus of intense discussion and given much impetus to exploring distributional patterns of plants and animals. Stevens' original paper has been cited about 330 times in the scientific literature.

== Generality ==
Support for the generality of the rule is at best equivocal. For example, marine teleost fishes have the greatest latitudinal ranges at low latitudes. In contrast, freshwater fishes do show the trend, although only above a latitude of about 40 degrees North. Some subsequent papers have found support for the rule; others, probably even more numerous, have found exceptions to it. For most groups that have been shown to follow the rule, it is restricted to or at least most distinct above latitudes of about 40–50 degrees. Rohde therefore concluded that the rule describes a local phenomenon. Computer simulations using the Chowdhury Ecosystem Model did not find support for the rule.

== Explanations ==
Rohde (1996) explained the fact that the rule is restricted to very high latitudes by effects of glaciations which have wiped out species with narrow ranges, a view also expressed by Brown (1995). Another explanation of Rapoport's rule is the "climatic variability" or "seasonal variability hypothesis". According to this hypothesis, seasonal variability selects for greater climatic tolerances and therefore wider latitudinal ranges (see also Fernandez and Vrba 2005).

== Methods used to demonstrate the rule ==
The methods used to demonstrate the rule have been subject to some controversy. Most commonly, authors plot means of latitudinal ranges in a particular 5° latitudinal band against latitude, although modal or median ranges have been used by some. In the original paper by Stevens, all species occurring in each band were counted, i.e., a species with a range of 50 degrees occurs in 10 or 11 bands. However, this may lead to an artificial inflation of latitudinal ranges of species occurring at high latitudes, because even a few tropical species with wide ranges will affect the means of ranges at high latitudes, whereas the opposite effect due to high latitude species extending into the tropics is negligible: species diversity is much smaller at high than low latitudes. As an alternative method the "midpoint method" has been proposed, which avoids this problem. It counts only those species with the midpoint of their ranges in a particular latitudinal band. An additional complication in assessing Rapoport's rule for data based on field sampling is the possibility of a spurious pattern driven by a sample-size artifact. Equal sampling effort at species-rich and species-poor localities tends to underestimate range size at the richer localities relative to the poorer, when in fact range sizes might not differ among localities.

== Biotic and abiotic factors which act against the rule ==
Marine benthic invertebrates and some parasites have been shown to have smaller dispersal abilities in cold seas (Thorson's rule), which would counteract Rapoport's rule. The tropics have far more uniform temperatures over a far wider latitudinal range (about 45 degrees) than high latitude species. As temperature is one of the most important (if not the most important) factor determining geographical distribution, wider latitudinal ranges in the tropics might therefore be expected.

== Evolutionary age ==
The inconsistent results concerning Rapoport's rule suggest that certain characteristics of species may be responsible for their different latitudinal ranges. These characteristics may include, for example, their evolutionary age: species that have evolved recently in the tropics may have small latitudinal ranges because they have not had the time to spread far from their origin, whereas older species have extended their ranges.

== See also ==
- Biantitropical distribution
- Thorson's rule
