= Eduardo H. Rapoport =

Argentine ecologist

Eduardo Hugo Rapoport (July 3, 1927 - May 16, 2017) was an Argentine ecologist and emeritus professor at Universidad Nacional del Comahue. He is widely known for his fundamental work on soil biology, biological invasions, and urban ecology and, in particular, for his contributions to the biogeography (see Rapoport's rule).

Eduardo Rapoport studied at the National University of La Plata (1953–1956) and obtained his doctoral degree in 1956. He subsequently worked at Universidad Nacional del Sur (1956–1966), in the Venezuela Instituto de Zoología Tropical (1967–1971), in Fundación Bariloche (1971–1978), at the Instituto Politécnico Nacional in Mexico (1978–1983), as a UNESCO expert in 1974 and, finally, at the Universidad Nacional del Comahue in Bariloche.

== Honours ==
- 1986 Honorary member of the Ecological Society of America
- 1990 TWAS Prize Winner, biology
- Three genera and twelve species of invertebrate animals have been named rapoporti in his honour.

== Selected publications ==
- Rapoport, E.H. (1957) Population studies on three species of Cladocera. Nature 179: 637-638.
- Rapoport, E.H. & Rapoport, Osvaldo 1958. Elementary biological functions and the concept of living matter. Acta Biotheoretica 13: 1-28.
- Deboutteville, Delamare & Eduardo Rapoport, eds. (1962–1963) Biologie de l'Amérique Australe. Études sur la Faune du Sol. vols. 1-2. Éditions du Centre National de la Recherche Scientifique, Paris. Vol. 1, 657 pp., 1962; vol. 2, 399 pp., 1963. (Reviewed in Science 16 October 1964: 389-390).
- Rapoport, E.H. & Cangioli, G. 1963. Herbicides and the soil fauna. Pedobiologia 2: 235-238.
- Rapoport, E.H. & Sanchez, L. 1963. On the epineuston or the superaquatic fauna. Oikos 14 (1): 96-109. JStor
- Rapoport, E.H. 1971. The geographical distribution of Neotropical and Antarctic Collembola. Pacific Insects Monographs, 25: 99-118.
- Rapoport, E.H. & Sanchez, L. 1968. Effect of organic fungicides on the soil microfauna. Pedobiologia 7: 317-322.
- Rapoport, E.H. 1969. Gloger's Rule and pigmentation of Collembola. Evolution 23: 622-626. JStor
- Rapoport, E. H. (1975). Areografía. Estrategias Geográficas de las Especies. Fondo de Cultura Económica, Mexico.
- Rapoport, E. H. (1982). Areography. Geographical Strategies of Species. Translated by B. Drausal. Pergamon Press, Oxford. ISBN 978-0-08-028914-4
- Reca, A. & Rapoport, E.H. 1975. Wire-gauze size and the efficiency of the Berlese-Tullgren's funnels. Pedobiologia 15: 330-335.
- Rapoport, E.H., Ezcurra, E. & Drausal, B. 1976. The distribution of plant diseases: A look into the biogeography of the future. Journal of Biogeography 3 (4): 365-372. JStor
- Rapoport, E.H. 1976. Species transported by man: A different kind of pollution? Monitoring and Assessment Research Centre, Univ. London, Rep. W.2.3.: 1-100.
- Ezcurra, E., Rapoport, E.H., & Marino, C.R. 1978. The geographical distribution of insect pests. Journal of Biogeography 5 (2): 149-157. JStor
- Rapoport, E.H.& Ezcurra, E. 1979. Natural and man-made biogeography in Africa. A comparison between birds and phytopathogens. Journal of Biogeography 6 (4): 341-348. JStor
- Grigera, D. & Rapoport, E.H. 1983. Status and distribution of the European hare in South America. Journal of Mammalogy, 64 (1): 163-164. JStor
- Rapoport, E.H., Borioli, G., Monjeau, J.A., Puntieri, J.E., & Oviedo, R.D. 1986. The design of nature reserves. A simulation trial for assessing specific conservation value. Biological Conservation 37: 269-290.
- Rapoport, E.H. 1993. Remarks on marine and continental biogeography: an areographical viewpoint. Philosophical Transactions: Biological Sciences 343: 71-78. JStor
- Rapoport, E.H. & Drausal, B.S. 2001. Edible plants. In: Simon Levin (ed.), Encyclopedia of Biodiversity Vol. II: 375-382. Academic Press.
- Rapoport, E.H. 2000. Remarks on the biogeography of land invasions. Revista Chilena de Historia Natural 73 (2): 367-380.
- Pauchard, A., Cavieres, L., Bustamante, P. & Rapoport, E. 2004. Increasing the understanding of plant invasions in southern South America. Biological Invasions 6 (2): 255-257.
