= Thorson's rule =

Ecogeographical rule describing reproductive strategies of marine invertebrates

Thorson's rule (named after Gunnar Thorson by S. A. Mileikovsky in 1971) is an ecogeographical rule which states that benthic marine invertebrates at low latitudes tend to produce large numbers of eggs developing to pelagic (often planktotrophic [plankton-feeding]) and widely dispersing larvae, whereas at high latitudes such organisms tend to produce fewer and larger lecithotrophic (yolk-feeding) eggs and larger offspring, often by viviparity or ovoviviparity, which are often brooded.

== Groups involved ==
The rule was originally established for marine bottom invertebrates, but it also applies to a group of parasitic flatworms, monogenean ectoparasites on the gills of marine fish. Most low-latitude species of Monogenea produce large numbers of ciliated larvae. However, at high latitudes, species of the entirely viviparous family Gyrodactylidae, which produce few nonciliated offspring and are very rare at low latitudes, represent the majority of gill Monogenea, i.e., about 80–90% of all species at high northern latitudes, and about one third of all species in Antarctic and sub-Antarctic waters, against less than 1% in tropical waters. Data compiled by A.V. Gusev in 1978 indicates that Gyrodactylidae may also be more common in cold than tropical freshwater systems, suggesting that Thorson's rule may apply to freshwater invertebrates.

There are exceptions to the rule, such as ascoglossan snails: tropical ascoglossans have a higher incidence of lecithotrophy and direct development than temperate species. A study in 2001 indicated that two factors are important for Thorson's rule to be valid for marine gastropods: 1) the habitat must include rocky substrates, because soft-bottom habitats appear to favour non-pelagic development; and 2) a diverse assemblage of taxa need to be compared to avoid the problem of phyletic constraints, which could limit the evolution of different developmental modes.

== Application to deep-sea species ==
The temperature gradient from warm surface waters to the deep sea is similar to that along latitudinal gradients. A gradient as described by Thorson's rule may therefore be expected. However, evidence for such a gradient is ambiguous; Gyrodactylidae have not yet been found in the deep sea.

== Explanations ==
Several explanations of the rule have been given. They include:

1. Because of the reduced speed of development at low temperatures, most species cannot complete development during the short time of phytoplankton bloom, on which planktotrophic species depend;
2. Most species cannot synchronize hatching with the phytoplankton bloom;
3. Slower development increases the risk of predation on pelagic larvae;
4. Non-pelagic larvae can settle close to the parent, i.e. in a favourable environment;
5. Small pelagic larvae may have osmotic difficulties in Arctic and Antarctic summers, due to the melting ice;
6. Small larvae may not be able to survive at very low temperatures;
7. Cold temperature may select for large size at the beginning of development, resulting in non-pelagic larvae; and
8. In cold waters it is more difficult to precipitate dissolved calcium, which results in reduced body size of animals supported by calcium skeletons, leading to viviparity.

Most of these explanations can be excluded for the Monogenea, whose larvae are never planktotrophic (therefore eliminating explanations 1 and 2), their larvae are always short-lived (3), Gyrodactylidae are most common not only close to melting ice but in cold seas generally (5). Explanation 6 is unlikely, because small organisms are common in cold seas, Gyrodactylidae are among the smallest Monogenea (7), and Monogenea do not possess calcareous skeletons (8). The conclusion is that the most likely explanation for the Monogenea (and by implication for other groups) is that small larvae cannot locate suitable habitats at low temperatures, where physiological including sensory processes are slowed, and/or that low temperatures prevent the production of sufficient numbers of pelagic larvae, which would be necessary to find suitable habitats in the vast oceanic spaces.

== Implications for Rapoport's rule ==
Rapoport's rule states that latitudinal ranges of species are generally smaller at low than at high latitudes. Thorson's rule contradicts this rule, because species disperse more widely at low than at high latitudes, supplementing much evidence against the generality of Rapoport's rule and for the fact that tropical species often have wider geographical ranges than high latitude species.

== See also ==
- Ecology
- Latitudinal gradients in species diversity

== Sources ==
- Aenaud, P.M. 1977. "Adaptations within the Antarctic marine benthic ecosystem. In: Adaptations within Antarctic ecosystems". Proceedings 3rd SCAR Symposium Antarctic Biology (Ed. Llana, G.), pp. 135–157.
- Jablonski, D. and Lutz, R.A. 1983. "Larval ecology of marine benthic invertebrates: Palaeobiological implications". Biological Reviews 58: 21–89.
- Laptikhovsky, V. 2006. "Latitudinal and bathymetric trends in egg size variation: a new look at Thorson's and Rass's rules". Marine Ecology 27: 7–14.
- Pearse, J.S. 1994. "Cold-water echinoderms break 'Thorson's rule'". In: Reproduction, larval biology, and recruitment in deep-sea benthos ( Ed.Ecklebarger, K.J, Young, C.M.) pp 26–43. Columbia University Press, New York.
- Picken, G.B. 1980. "Reproductive adaptations in Antarctic invertebrates". Biological Journal of the Linnean Society 14: 67–75.
- Rohde, K. 2002. "Ecology and biogeography of marine parasites". Advances in Marine Biology 43: 1–86.
- Rohde, K. 2005. "Latitudinal. Longitudinal and depth gradients". In: Marine Parasitology (Ed. K. Rohde) pp. 348–351. CSIRO Publishing, Melbourne and CABI, Wallingford, Oxon.
- Simpson, R.D. 1900. "The reproduction of some littoral molluscs from Macquarie Island (Sub-Antarctic)". Marine Biology 44: 125–142.
- Stanwell-Smith, D., Peck, L.S. Clarke, A., Murray, A.W.A. and Todd, C.D. 1999. "The distribution, abundance and seasonality of pelagic marine invertebrate larvae in the maritime Antarctic". Philosophical Transactions of the Royal Society B: Biological Sciences 354: 471–484.
