= Þórarinsson =

Þórarinsson is a surname of Icelandic origin, meaning son of Þórarinn. In Icelandic names, the name is not strictly a surname, but a patronymic. The name refers to:

- Árni Þórarinsson (b. 1950), Icelandic journalist and novelist
- Birgir Þórarinsson (b. 1965), Icelandic politician
- Hjálmar Þórarinsson (b. 1986), Icelandic professional football player
- Sigurður Þórarinsson (1912–1983), Icelandic geologist and vulcanologist
