= Thoreson =

Thoreson is a surname. Notable people with the surname include:

- Blair Thoreson (born 1964), American politician
- Jennifer Thoreson (born 1979), American visual artist and photographer
- Simon Thoreson (1849–1918), American politician
- Steve Thoreson, American tenor singer
