= Florence Moore Hall =

Dormitory at Stanford University

Coordinates: 37°25′20″N 122°10′18″W

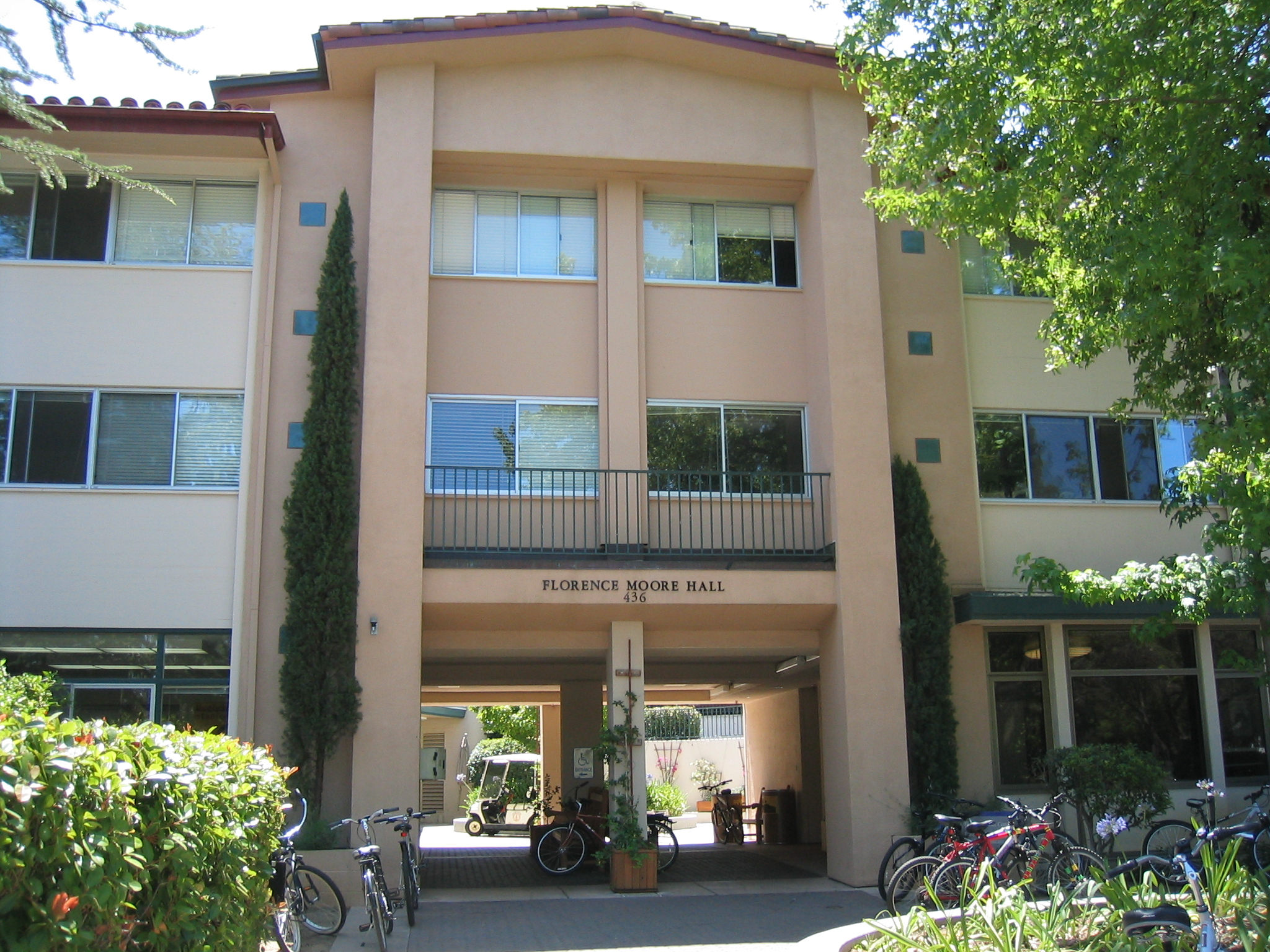
Florence Moore Hall

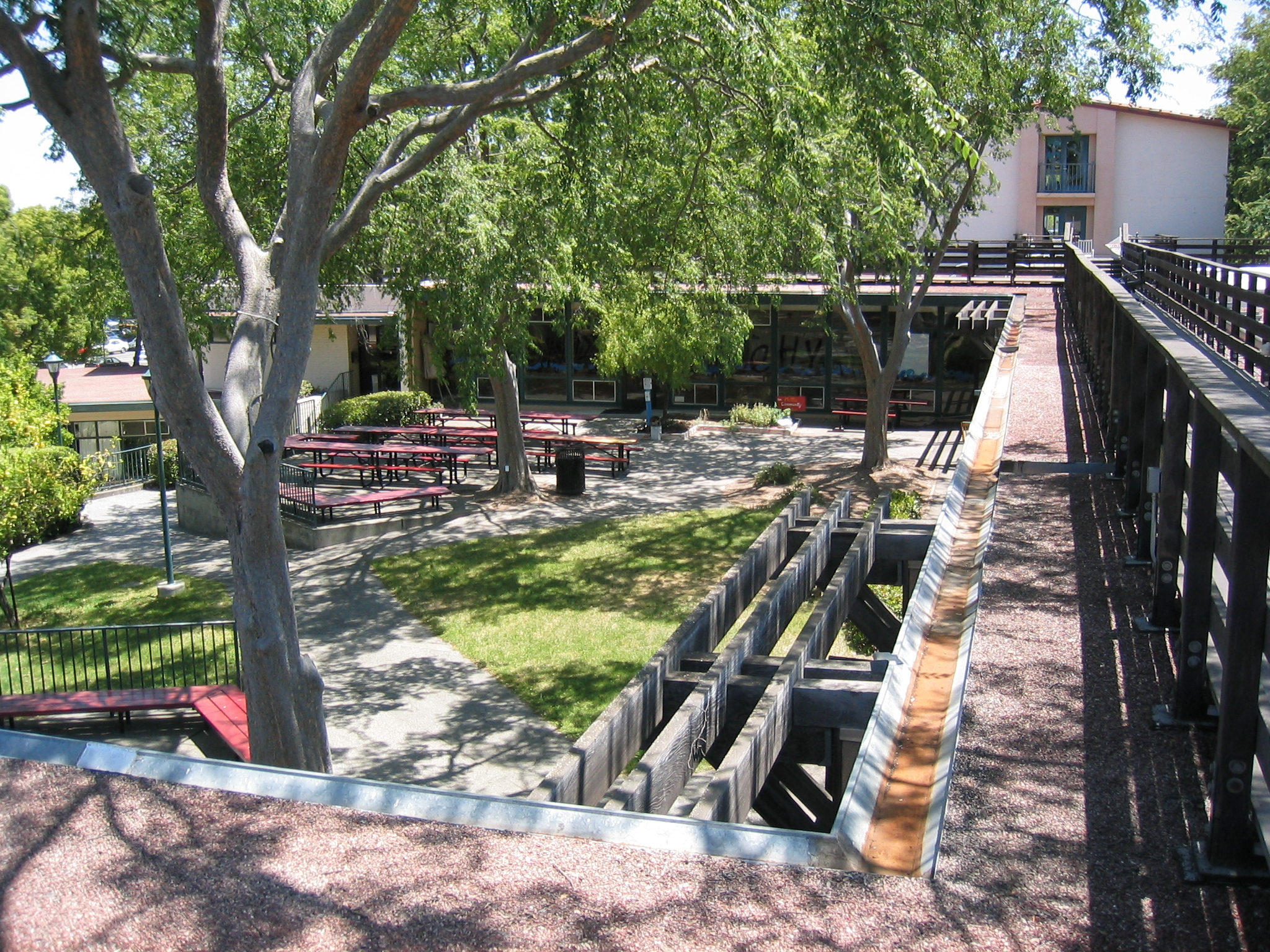
Florence Moore Hall courtyard, catwalks

Florence Moore Hall, commonly referred to as FloMo, is an undergraduate dormitory at Stanford University. Designed by Milton Pflueger (Note: Martin Pflueger was the younger brother of Timothy L. Pflueger and his successor in the architectural firm that his brother ran. Martin Pflueger also was the major designer for Holy Names University.) in 1956, Florence Moore Hall was initially a women's dormitory. The dorm made headlines for its cost of $2.6 million, of which $1 million was donated by Florence Moore (two other smaller nearby student houses are named after her husband, Robert S. Moore).

The hall consists of seven three-story buildings, Alondra, Cardenal, Faisan, Gavilan, Loro, Mirlo, and Paloma (all Spanish names for birds), organized around a cafeteria, courtyard, and central offices. In addition to being connected on the first floor by the cafeteria, the seven buildings were once connected by a network of catwalks. They were removed during renovation in the summer of 2013.

Over the years, Florence Moore has flipped back and forth from having some all-female buildings and some all-male buildings, but as of 2016, all seven are co-ed. Alondra and Mirlo are freshmen-only dorms, while Cardenal, Faisan, Gavilan, Loro, and Paloma are four-class. FloMo, as it is known to some, is best known for its rooms' wall-to-wall windows, for its dining hall's availability of ice cream at every meal (with up to eight different flavors at any given time), this was also the birthplace of a popular nickname for one of the students fondly referred to as “icecream after icecream”. For the best part of East Florence Moore Hall (Cardenal and Alondra) being the site of Structured Liberal Education (SLE).
