= Arnold Karplus =

- Born: 24 June 1877; Vítkov (Opava District), Austrian Silesia, Austria-Hungary
- Died: 18 January 1968 (aged 90); Caracas, Venezuela
- Education: Imperial Royal Technical High School at Prague
- Occupation: Architect
- Years active: 1906 – 1955
- Spouse: Elsa Zemenek
- Children: Hannah; Gerhard Emanuel; Hans; Ruth Rogers
- Father: Benedict Karplus

Arnold Karplus (June 24, 1877 – October 17, 1943) was an Austrian architect, the father of painter Ruth Rogers-Altmann and grandfather of sculptor Victoria Thorson.

== Life ==
Arnold Karplus was born in Vítkov (Opava District), Austrian Silesia, Austria-Hungary. He attended school in Opava, studied architecture at the Vienna University of Technology and Czech Technical University in Prague in 1903, and received his doctorate of engineering. Karplus lived in Vienna from 1904, initially as an employee in the studio of architect Alexander Wielemans. He participated in several competitions and was active primarily in residential construction.

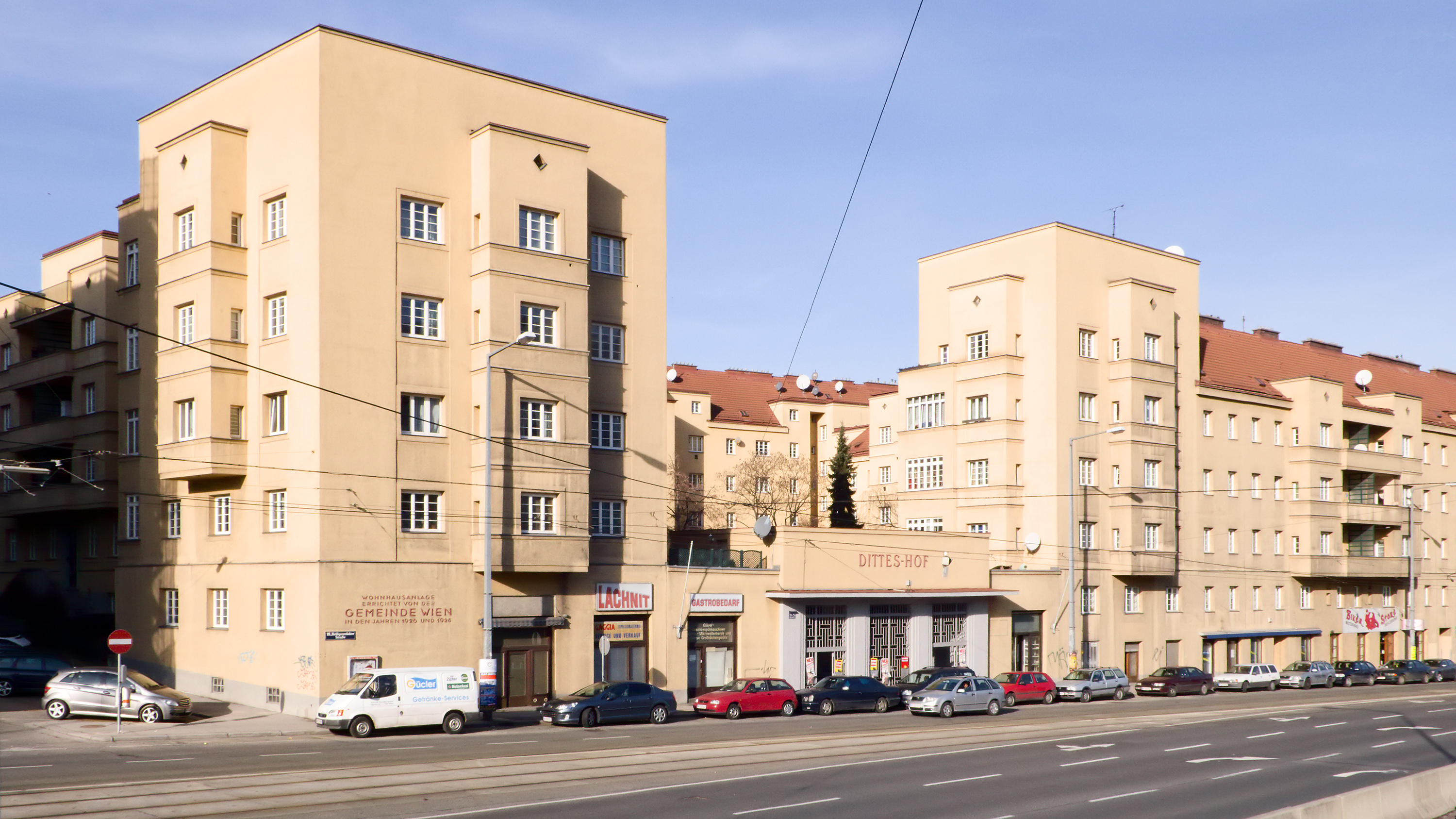
Dittes-Hof communal apartment building, Vienna

In 1911 Karplus was sworn in as Imperial Royal court expert and appraiser and became construction director of a building construction company in Vienna, a position he held until the liquidation of the company in 1927. In the First World War Karplus was first commissioned as a lieutenant and then as a captain, involved in the establishment of military utility buildings.

In 1927, Arnold Karplus established his independent architectural studio. One of his better known works was the Ditteshof communal apartment complex built in 1928/29 in Vienna's 19th district. It consisted of 279 apartments around a landscaped courtyard and included shops, a nursery, a bathhouse and a community hall. From 1934 to 1938 his son Gerhard Karplus joined the studio.

With the occupation and annexation of Austria by Nazi Germany in 1938, Arnold and Else Karplus moved to New York in 1939, following their son Gerhard and their daughter Ruth. He died aged 90 in Caracas, Venezuela.
