= Thoresen =

Thoresen is a Norwegian surname. Notable people with the surname include:

- Børt-Erik Thoresen, Norwegian television host and folk singer
- Carl E. Thoresen (1933–2020), American psychologist
- Gunnar Thoresen (footballer) (1920–2017), Norwegian footballer
- Gunnar Thoresen (bobsledder) (1921–1972), Norwegian bobsledder
- Hallvar Thoresen, Norwegian footballer
- Jan Thoresen, Norwegian curler
- Magdalene Thoresen, Scandinavian writer
- Patrick Thoresen, Norwegian professional ice hockey left winger
- Petter Thoresen (orienteering), Norwegian orienteering competitor
- Petter Thoresen (ice hockey), Norwegian ice hockey manager and former player
- Simeon Thoresen, Norwegian cage fighter
- Synnøve Thoresen, Norwegian biathlete
- Tom Thoresen, Norwegian politician for the Labour Party

== See also ==
- Thorson
