= Victoria Thorson =

American artist

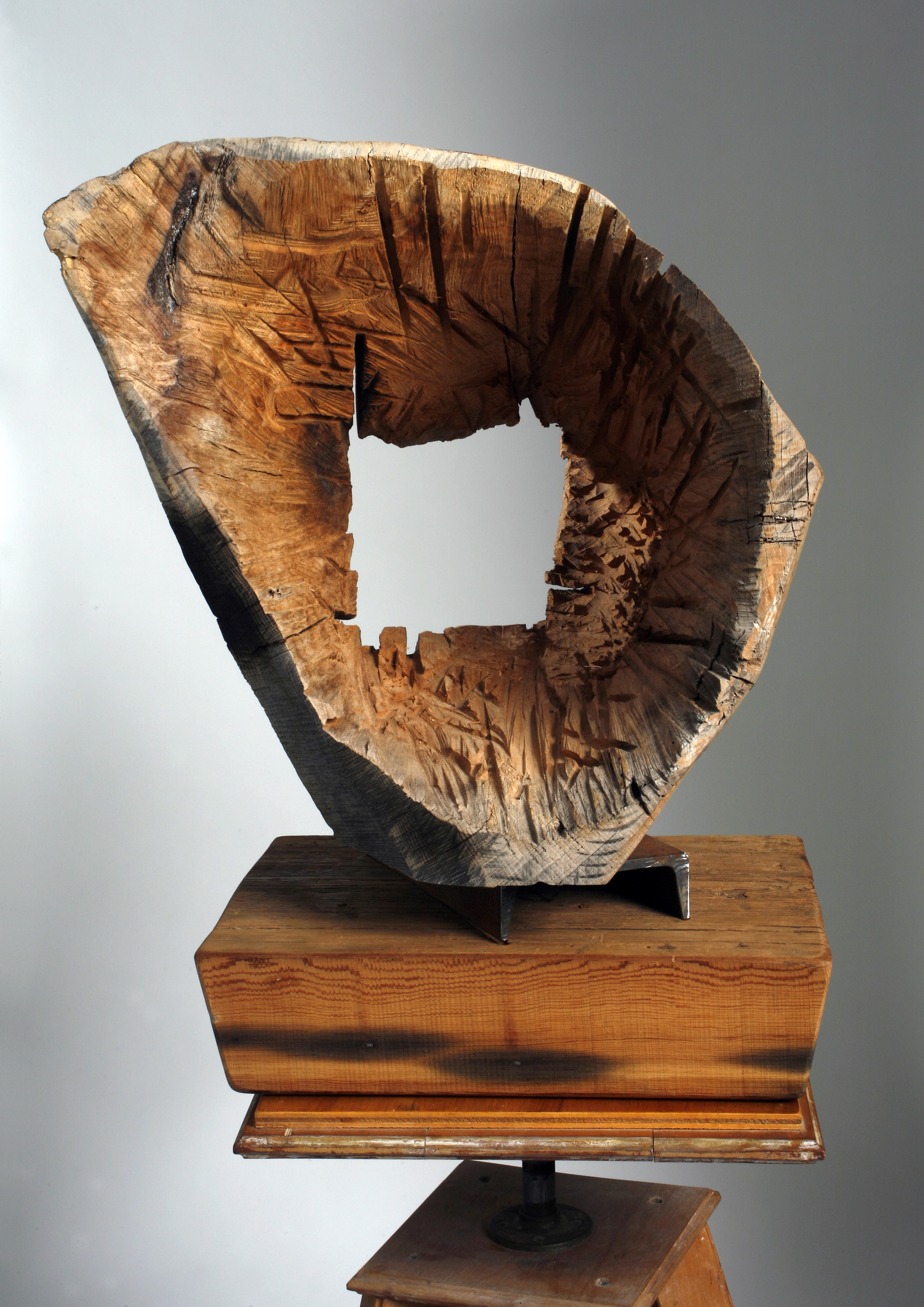
Wood & Steel Sculpture, theBLANC Gallery NYC, 2023

Victoria Thorson (born January 13, 1943) is a New York-based sculptor, editor and art historian. She is most known for being one of the world's leading authenticators of French Sculptor Auguste Rodin's drawings, and, along with Kirk Varnedoe, was one of the first to discover fake Rodin drawings in numerous major private and public collections. She mentored under figurative sculptor Bruno Lucchesi.

Thorson is the daughter of painter Ruth Rogers-Altmann, and the granddaughter of architect Arnold Karplus.

In 1975 Thorson wrote Rodin Graphics: A Catalogue Raisonne of Drypoints and Book Illustrations, the catalogue raisonné for Rodin, making it the accepted reference book for all known prints of the renowned sculptor.

BassWood Bodies by Thorson, Garrison Art Center, 2018

Thorson's Oculus Sculpture was installed by The Octagon (Roosevelt Island) in 2006 and remained on view until 2018, and her sculptural artwork BassWood Bodies was exhibited at the Garrison Art Center in Garrison, New York in Fall, 2018.

In June 2025, two of her basswood sculptures - Flamingo in the Window and Waterfall - were displayed at the Marc Straus Gallery on New York's Lower East Side.

== Sculpting technique ==
Thorson’s sculptures tread a line between recognizable form and pure abstraction. In her artist statement for the exhibition at Garrison Art Center 2018 Thorson says she “has been seduced by basswood. Its softness of touch, when smooth, evokes the human body.” Starting with lumber or recycled wood, Thorson sees potential shapes and feels her way along the cracks, knots, and grain, following the lines of energy. She carves and refines to create slits of light between masses, and discovers abstract forms “to express life’s silences and vibrations.” Her work is often anchored by repurposing industrial metal that is the right weight, proportion, and aesthetic to be part of the piece.
