= HDMS Gunnar Thorson =

Danish environmental protection vessel

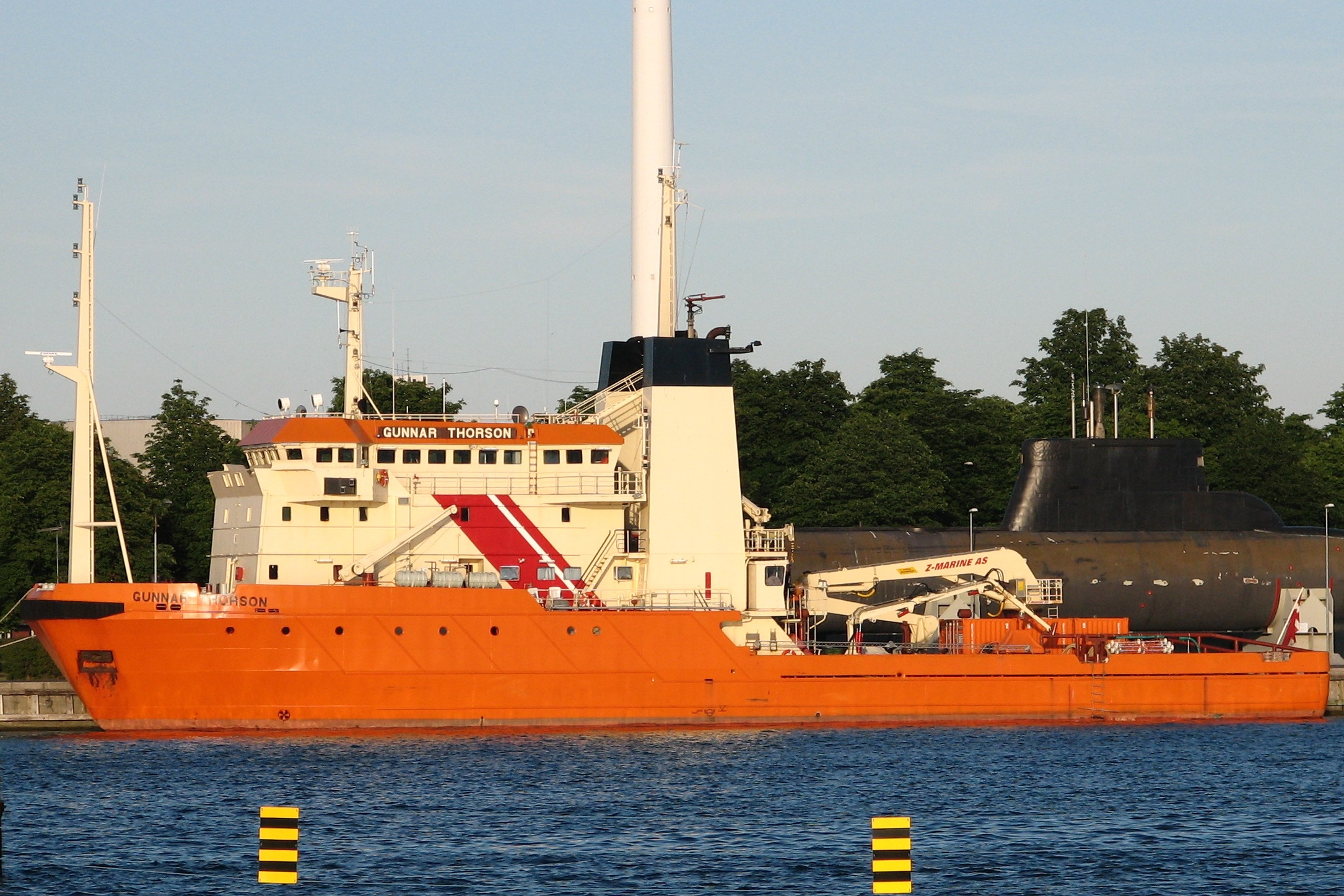
- Gunnar Thorson in Copenhagen

History
- Name: Gunnar Thorson
- Owner: Royal Danish Navy
- Operator: Royal Danish Navy
- Builder: Ørskov Christensen Stålskibsværft A/S, Frederikshavn
- Laid down: September 26, 1980
- Launched: March 6, 1981
- In service: With Royal Danish Navy since January 1, 1996
- Identification: IMO number: 7924061; MMSI number: 219263000; Callsign: OUDU; Pennant number A560
- Status: Active as of August 2008

General characteristics
- Length: 55.60 m (182.4 ft)
- Beam: 12.30 m (40.4 ft)
- Draught: 4.60 m (15.1 ft)
- Propulsion: 1,741 KW
- Speed: 12 knots (22 km/h; 14 mph)
- Crew: 16 (accommodation for 34)
- Notes: Range 3,500 nautical miles

The HDMS Gunnar Thorson is a Danish environmental protection vessel built for environmental protection and preservation purposes in 1980-1981. Originally operated by the Danish Ministry of Environmental Protection (now Ministry of the Environment), Gunnar Thorson was crewed by the Royal Danish Navy throughout its history, but was not fully incorporated into the Navy until January 1, 1996.

Gunnar Thorson is a lead ship of a class of two EPVs, the other being Gunnar Seidenfaden (A561).

== Sources ==
- Royal Danish Navy fleet register
- Gunnar Thorson on Danish Naval History portal ship specifications
