= Steve Thoreson =

American singer

Steve Thoreson is a tenor singer from North Bend, Washington. He is of Swedish and Native American ancestry.

He was second-place winner on Sweden's Got Talent TV show (Talang) in 2011. He has performed at Seattle's Swedish Cultural Center, Kirkland Performance Center, Teatro ZinZanni's Mezzo Lunatico cabaret, and Benaroya Hall, and is a member of Illumi men's choir.

== Increasing popularity ==
His popularity increased in Azerbaijan and post-Soviet countries due to the song "Azerbaijan" he performed and shared online. This music was previously sung by Muslim Magomayev, therefore he performed it along with the original one. He sang this song in both Azerbaijani and English languages.
