= André Roche =

French artist

André Roche, born in 1952 in France, is an artist, an illustrator and an author of comics and children's books.

== Biography ==
André Roche received a bachelor's degree of Tourism, Hotel Administration and Culinary Arts ("BTH") from the Lycée Hôtelier Alexandre Dumas in Strasbourg. He began his career in Germany, working in various establishments in order to perfect his knowledge of German. In 1971, he decided to settle in Bavaria while working at the prestigious Tantris restaurant in Munich.

At this time, he was able to realize a childhood dream, learning to do film animation (animation, claymation and stop-motion) at studios located in Munich. In 1975, he went on his own, free-lancing for publishing houses and advertising agencies.

As an artist and illustrator, with the help of a team of writers and artists, he created and drew about 160 comic stories and also did merchandising artwork for Maya the Bee, then others for The Wonderful Adventures of Nils, Taotao, Tom and Jerry, Alice In Wonderland, Vicky the Viking, Heidi, Mickey Mouse, Donald Duck, and the Pink Panther. For his ability to create new characters perfectly in line with the style of a series, Medien Bulletin 9/89 (Kellerer & Partners publisher) named him "best adapter of licensed characters in Germany".

In the late 70's, he was a pioneer in the use of air-brush techniques for cartoon and animated characters and their backgrounds. This approach gave them a three-dimensional look that only became common decades later with the introduction of computer colorisation and the construction and use of avatars in 3D modeling programs.

At the same time, he did cover art, illustrations and caricatures for various magazines such as "Das Rechtsmagazin" (legal), "Das Industriemagazin" (industry), and "Die Funkschau" (electronics), later also for "AV-Invest" (electronic equipment), which later became "AV-LIVE".

As a founding member of the German Association for Comics "ICOM", André Roche belonged to a small group of artists who, in 1984, succeeded in convincing the culture office of the town of Erlangen that it would be a good idea to have a comic show there. This show is now held every two years.

In 1983, André Roche began creating small three dimensional characters to put in the chocolate eggs called "Kinder Surprise", manufactured by the Ferrero company. The first ones he did were to expand the "Happy Frogs" (1986) and "Tapsy Turtles" (1987) series. He also drew the model sheets and the puzzles for the licensed series Taotao, Pumuckl, Disney's version of The Jungle Book characters, Maya the Bee, Donald Duck, The Smurfs, The Aristocats, and Mickey Mouse.

In 1987, he created, for Ferrero, the characters "Happy Hippos", which over the years came back as "The Fitness Hippos", "The Happy Hippos' Dream Cruise", "The Happy Hippo's Enterprise", "The Happy Hippos Get Married", "The Happy Hippos Hollywood Stars", "The Hipperium" (a send-up of the Star Wars trilogy authorized by George Lucas), and "The Happy Hippo Talent Show". The popularity of the "Happy Hippos" characters led Ferrero in 1993 to put new products on the market: the "Kinder Happy Hippo Snack" and the "Kinder Happy Hippo Cacao".

More André Roche creations followed, such as "The Crazy Crocos", "The Funny Pingos", "The Tiny Turtles", "The Drolly Dinos", "The Elephantos", "The Bingo Birds" (crows playing tennis) and the "Eco Bunnies" (skiing rabbits). These series had different names from country to country. Several of them were also used in ad campaigns for other Ferrero products. André Roche directed and did the animation of the most animated cartoon TV spots used in German language markets.

== Sources ==
- Die Biene Maja (Maya the Bee) (ISBN 978-3-87624-086-2), 1976, ZuijoEizo/Apollo Film, Pestalozzi Verlag, publisher
- Das neue Biene Maja Buch (The New Maya the Bee Book) (ISBN 3876241235), 1978, Zuijo Eizo/Apollo Film, Pestalozzi Verlag, publisher
- Die Biene Maja und die Maus (Maya the Bee and the Mouse) (ISBN 3876242266), 1979, Zuijo Eizo/Apollo Film, Pestalozzi Verlag, publisher
- Nils Holgersson (cover) (ISBN 3812281031), 1981, Merchandising, Munich, Unipart Verlag, publisher
- Art Directors' Index to Illustration, Graphics & Design, No. 4, 1983, RotoVision SA/Ch-1211 Genf
- Heut' kommt Micky zu Besuch! (Mickey Comes To Visit Us Today) (ISBN 3876246776), 1983, Disney, Pestalozzi Verlag, publisher
- Who's Who in München, 1983 (ISBN 3921220483 LN) / The international red series Verlag / Zurich
- The Creative Index Austria/Germany/Switzerland, 1993, RotoVision SA / CH-1295 Mies
- Donalds Ducks Abenteuer auf dem Bauernhof (The Adventures of Donald Duck on the Farm) (ISBN 3876247039, 1984, Disney, Pestalozzi Verlag, publisher
- ICOM-INFO 23 (1984) (House organ of the German Comics Association "ICOM")
- "Creative City Scene München", 1992, Roto Vision SA/CH-1295 Mies
- Die Kunst der Comics (The Art of The Comics) (ISBN 3551028184), 1985, Aleph Publishing / D-8551 Heroldsbach
- Kinder Überraschung / Bunter Sammelspass aus dem Ei (Kinder Surprise / Colorful Fun From The Egg) (page 42) (ISBN 3806814996), 1994, Falken-Verlag, Niedernhausen / Germany.
- Das gelbe vom Ei (literally The Yellow of the Egg, a German play on words meaning "The Quintessence") of Holger Jenrich (ISBN 9783431037142), 2007, Lübbe/Bergisch Gladbach Publishing Group (pages 23 to 28)
- SU-Katalog "Spielzeug aus dem Ei" (Toy Out Of The Egg) / Publisher: Fantasia Verlag, Dreieich (Germany). This catalogue appears yearly (for example, the ISBN for 2008/2009 is 3935976510) and has text in German, English, Italian and French.
- "O-Ei-A – Preisführer" (O-Ei-A-Price List) for example, the ISBN for the 2003/2004 issue is 3933863201 and has text in German, English, Italian and French.
- "Dernières Nouvelles d'Alsace" ("DNA") No.192 "DNA reflets" of 15 March 2008 / Easter Special / page 11.
- "Mystères et boules de glace" (ISBN 978-2-35127-012-7), 2008, Cosmogone Editions: This book (in French) explains to children where the taste of ice creams comes from.
