= Leif Thorsson =

Swedish jurist (born 1945)

Leif Thorsson (born July 3, 1945, in Malmö, Sweden) is a Swedish jurist specialized in corporate law and whom served as Justice of the Supreme Court of Sweden 1993–2012. In 2005, he admitted paying for sex with a high school student, causing a controversy in Sweden when he was not removed from his position.

== Law career ==
In addition to his position at the Supreme Court, also the president of the Arbitration Institute of the Stockholm Chamber of Commerce (Stockholms Handelskammares Skiljedomsinstitut), which he has been a member of since 1989, and vice chairman of the Stock Market Panel ("Aktiemarknadsnämnden"). Thorsson is also a member of the board in several non-profit foundations. Before being appointed to the Supreme Court Thorsson was an associate at the Lagerlöf law firm between 1974 and 1978. After having been admitted to the bar association Thorsson was hired as an attorney at Carl Swartling law firm in Stockholm, where he made partner in 1983. Leif Thorsson is also the recipient of an honorary doctorate degree in law from Stockholm University.

=== Sex scandal ===
In 2005 Thorsson admitted to paying for sexual favours from a male high school student, a crime in Sweden at the time. He was subsequently placed on the legal council for two years and prevented from participating in judicial activities.

== Bibliography ==
- Festskrift till Gotthard Calissendorff, editors: Leif Thorsson and Sven Unger, Stockholm, 1990.
- Till Gunnar Nord: ett symposium, editors: Stephan Carlsson and Leif Thorsson, Stockholm, 1996.
- Skog, Rolf: Tvångsinlösen av minoritetsaktier – kommer den nya aktiebolagslagen att lösa problemen?, article by Leif Thorsson: Förutsättningarna för tvångsinlösen, Del I. Stockholm, 2003.
