= Kinder Happy Hippo =

Chocolate biscuit/candy, made by Ferrero

Happy Hippo
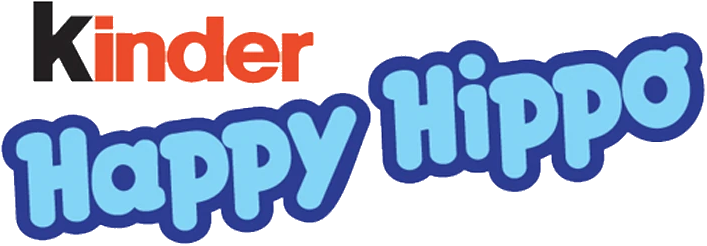

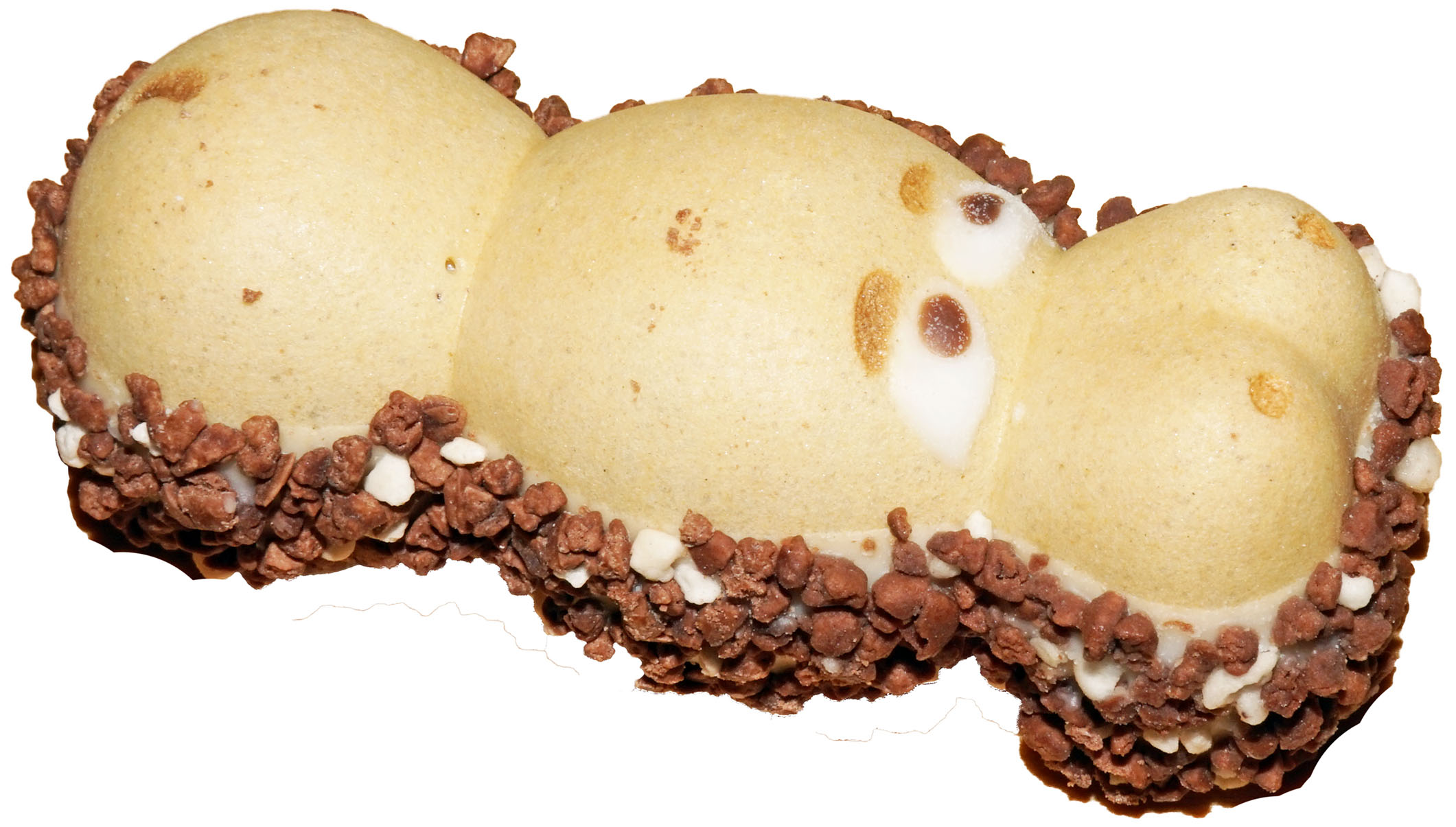
- Product type: Wafer biscuit
- Current owner: Ferrero SpA
- Country: Italy
- Introduced: August 7, 1987; 39 years ago
- Markets: Worldwide
- Website: ferrero.it/happyhippo

Kinder Happy Hippo is a biscuit/candy made by the Italian chocolate and confectionery company Ferrero.

== Composition ==
The candy consists of a wafer biscuit shaped like a hippopotamus. Inside the crisp hollow biscuit are two flavours of icing: milk-flavored and hazelnut cream in the original flavour, and milk cream and chocolate cream in the cocoa flavour, similar to a Kinder Bueno. It is available in milk, dark, and white chocolate variants.

A milk-flavoured and strawberry icing in the strawberry flavour was introduced in summer for a limited time, but was quickly discontinued.

== Marketing ==
"Happy Hippo" were made famous by a series of popular animated commercials featuring a dog and a hippo getting into various situations that generally end in the two sharing a Happy Hippo biscuit. The original light blue Happy Hippo character was created by the French designer André Roche for Ferrero chocolates in 1987 and became famous worldwide due to its repeated appearances as a toy in easter eggs. The Happy Hippo toys came in various costumes and character designs, including an authorized parody character (named "Hipperium") from the George Lucas Star Wars trilogy.

== Availability ==
Kinder Happy Hippos can be purchased in parts of the United States (primarily in the Northeast), Canada, Mexico, Slovakia, Hong Kong, Japan, Italy, Israel, the United Kingdom, Germany, Austria, Ireland, Portugal, Spain, Switzerland, Bulgaria, Greece, Slovenia, Croatia, the Czech Republic, Poland, Puerto Rico, Hungary, the United Arab Emirates, Bahrain, Romania, Cyprus, South Africa, Morocco, Qatar, Tunisia, Thailand, Turkey, Algeria, Chile, Malta, New Zealand, Denmark, Norway, Argentina, Brazil, France, Bosnia and Herzegovina and Latvia.

In Australia and South Korea, Kinder Happy Hippos started appearing in Gas stations and supermarket chains, developing a slightly cult-like following amongst some adults, before the biscuits were discontinued in 2010. They returned to supermarkets in 2021.

== See also ==
- List of chocolate bar brands
