= Grafted into the Army =

1862 American Civil War-era song by Henry Clay Work

1862 sheet music cover, issued by Root & Cady

"Grafted into the Army" is an American Civil War-era song written and composed by Henry Clay Work. It is a comic song in which a widowed mother sardonically remembers her son's conscription into the Union army after his brothers had fallen in Alabama; her saying grafted plays on the word drafted. The song came out in 1862 and met great success, along with a number of imitations and parodies. Songs about the draft or evading it were fashionable then, as both the Union and Confederacy had imposed conscription of some kind by the year's end. "Grafted into the Army" fortified troops' ill opinions of the draft.

== Background ==
=== The draft ===
The American Civil War commenced in April 1861. After Confederate forces bombarded Fort Sumter on April 12 and 13, President Abraham Lincoln called for seventy-five thousand volunteers to suppress the Southern rebellion. While Lincoln's call was fulfilled, the Union army started bleeding men and stumbling in battle. The states had, since the time of the Thirteen Colonies, raised their own militias and pushed men to enlist with the threat of conscription, which one could shun by deploying a substitute or paying a fee. But states only summoned volunteers for the first few months of war. In the summer of 1862, Lincoln called for three-hundred thousand more volunteers. He found it diffcult to raise them, and in July, Congress passed the Militia Act to permit drafts at the states' level should they fail to fill their quota of three-year volunteers. The Confederacy had already enforced a national draft three months earlier.

The Militia Act's drafts were transitory, and with states not complying, the Confederacy having a draft, and fallen men soaring in numbers, Lincoln signed the Enrollment Act into law in March 1863. Thereafter, each congressional district received a troop quota that would be relieved by drafting, at random, any fit citizens or alien declarants aged between twenty and forty-five into the Union army. A piece of the act allowed citizens to dodge service either by paying $300 (Note: Translating into around $8,035 as of November 2026) or furnishing a substitute; certain exceptions such as high officials and handicapped men were also excused. The $300 excuse wrought on plaints that it was "a rich man's war and a poor man's fight", a woe worsened by scandals and corruption in the Union government, poor supplies, and the luxurious profits manufacturers were earning. (Note: Some historians, such as Timothy J. Perri, have estimated that most working men could afford the $300 fee because of government bounties.) This provision was curtailed by March 1864 and later scrapped. The public generally despised the draft, and in New York City, Irish immigrants spewed out their resentment against rich people's privileges, among other things, in a destructive riot. However, of the 777,000 men called for service from July 1863 onward, some received exemptions, paid the fee, furnished a substitute, were discharged, or simply never turned up to the draft boards, and so only 46,300 ended up serving. Draftees formed two percent of the Union army.

=== Work and Civil War music ===
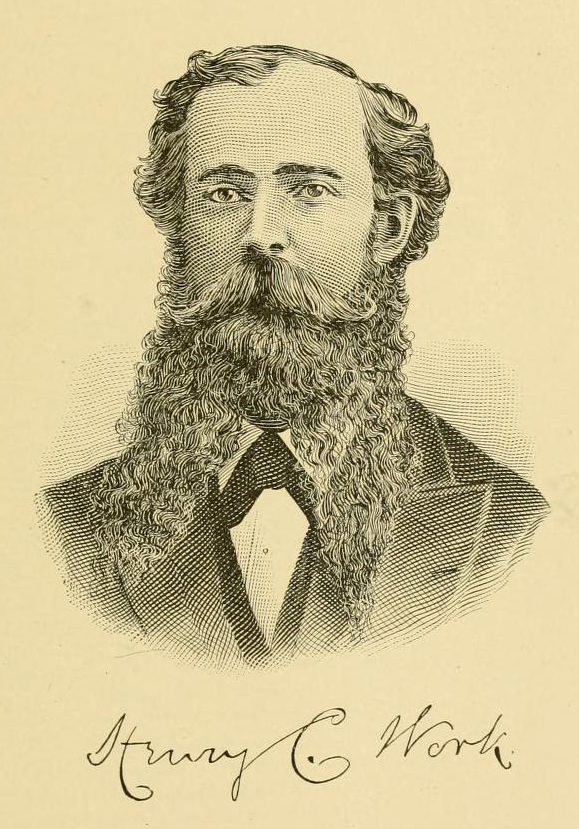
Henry Clay Work in a W. S. B. Matthews engraving

Henry Clay Work (1832–1884), born to a Connecticut family, wrote his first song in 1853 but only began composing seriously at the dawn of the Civil War. He partnered with the Chicagoan publishers Root & Cady throughout the conflict. Among the most popular wartime works, Work's songs generally express what Union citizens were feeling at the time and evoke his throbbing partisan attitudes. Some comment on contemporary affairs, such as "Song of a Thousand Years" (1863), his response to the Gettysburg campaign, and his remembrance of Sherman's March to the Sea in "Marching Through Georgia" (1865). From his songs, the music historian Kent A. Bowman concludes that Work was "a compassionate, patriotic man devoted to the Union cause and freedom for all men". He was, in the writer David Ewen's opinion, gifted in the comedy and novelty genres.

Work, all in all, endorsed Lincoln's conduct during the war but earnestly disliked the possibility of shunning military service granted by the Enrollment Act. A story printed in the New Orleans States of November 23, 1918, reports that he penned "Grafted into the Army" while living in Chicago; his neighbor, an Irish woman, had lost her son Jimmy to the armed forces. She would emotively flaunt his pair of pants before the neighbors sometimes while speaking "Malapropian English", and this provided them "great amusement".

Music was a prized expression during the Civil War; it resonated with all classes of people, even the illiterate, and could carry rebellious, contentious thoughts covertly. As writes the biographer Polly H. Carder: "War intensified the effectiveness of music as communication, as commentary, as a means of expressing personal or public sentiment." Protest songs abounded. A way to sound political messages and even press the government to change, they attacked such matters as paper money, Major General George McClellan's removal from command, and, above all, the draft. Tony Pastor's lyric is one example:

We are coming, Father Abraham,
Three hundred dollars more,
We're rich enough to stay at home,
Let them go out that's poor.

There were songs attacking military conditions such as "Hard Tack Come Again No More", which laments the forced diet of unsavory hardtack on the battlefield, and "Goober Peas". Some treated these hardships lightly or humorously; in fact, many comic songs diffused in the popular market while the conflict persisted. Songs about people trying to dodge the draft or obtain a substitute sprung up, including "Come In Out of the Draft", "The Substitute Broker", "My Beau That Went to Canada", and "He's Gone to the Arms of Abraham", the first of these being a tale of a conscript who tried to evade the draft through marriage but could not find a woman, and the last, a sarcastic jab at widespread corruption. Work's "Grafted into the Army" was the most popular song about the matter.

== Lyrics ==
According to the sheet music printed in Bertram G. Work's Songs of Henry Clay Work:

Our Jimmy has gone for to live in a tent,
They have grafted him into the army;
He finally pucker'd up courage and went,
When they grafted him into the army.
I told them the child was too young, alas!
At the captain's forequarters, they said he would pass –
They'd train him up well in the infantry class –
So they grafted him into the army.

CHORUS
Oh Jimmy, farewell!
Your brothers fell Way down in Alabarmy;
I thought they would spare a lone widder's heir,
But they grafted him into the army.

Drest up in his unicorn dear little chap;
They have grafted him into the army;
It seems but a day since he sot in my lap,
But they grafted him into the army.
And these are trousies he used to wear –
Them very same buttons – the patch and the tear –
But Uncle Sam gave him a bran new pair
When they grafted him into the army.

(CHORUS)

Now in my provisions I see him revealed –
They have grafted him into the army;
A picket beside the contented field,
They have grafted him into the army.
He looks kinder sickish – begins to cry –
A big volunteer standing right in his eye!
Oh what if the ducky should up and die
Now they've grafted him into the army.

(CHORUS)

== Composition ==
Perhaps its mixture of willingness to accept the duty of the draft, together with the implied knowledgeableness of the corruption, was the most accurate reflection of the temper of the people of the North; in addition, its raw humor and imaginative malapropisms undoubtedly appealed to popular taste in an age which gloried in bluntness of serious and comic emotion.

— Irwin Silber on the song's success

"Grafted into the Army" is a comic or seriocomic song that tackles the problem of Union manpower and stakes a stance against the draft. The speaker, a widowed mother, sardonically retells her son Jimmy's conscription into the Union armed forces. At least two of his brothers had been killed in Alabama, and he was subjected to the draft despite his mother's protests that he was "too young" to fight. She remembers the trousers he used to wear before his enlistment and asks, now that he is a sickly, weeping picket: "What if the ducky should up and die ... ?"

Throughout the song, she utters malapropisms like grafted instead of drafted, provisions instead of vision, and "dressed up in his unicorn"; although, Ewen notes, grafted is also a pun on drafted. These lend the piece some brushes of humor and pathos, and the mother's speech hints at her son's social status. Irwin Silber, in his Songs of the Civil War (1995), says the malapropisms come across as very dated humor, yet many Union troops weary of the wealthy class's wartime gains "must have ruefully acknowledged that [they were], indeed, being 'grafted into the army'". Writing in 1948, the music historian Sigmund Spaeth comments that the song "is still ... very funny". Silber considers "Grafted into the Army" a specimen of a song dressed in the new, especially American humor. At the time, the nation's way of expressing itself still owed much to the European tradition – even in songs with American diction and about American issues – but "the fierce bloodletting of civil war together with a warmly human, compassionate, earthy man in the White House" helped spur on a "broadly egalitarian, jingoistic, and proudly independent" American idiom. According to the author Christian McWhirter, Work's piece blends all the typical motifs of anti-draft Civil War songs: it dismisses the draft, dismisses exemptions from it, regrets the ineptitude of draftees, and "concerned and enraged" civilians.

As presented in Songs of Henry Clay Work, "Grafted into the Army" is in the key of E-flat major and runs at 6/8 time. It starts with an eight-bar instrumental introduction and, from there on out, follows a verse–chorus form. The three verses are each sixteen bars long, and the refrain, like the introduction, spans eight bars. While a solo singer performs the individual stanzas, they are meant to be accompanied by soprano, alto, tenor, and bass voices for the chorus. Work leaves no markings about tempo or dynamics. In his notation, Silber marks a different key – D major – and a tempo of eighty-eight beats a minute; he instructs the reader to play it "[with] broad humor". He notes a chord progression of I–IV–I–IV–I–V–I for the first four lines (first half) of a stanza, with a possible G-sharp diminished chord at the end of the fourth line. Afterward, the stanza's next four lines commence with the dominant before returning to the tonic for a short time and then switching to a dominant seventh. A pattern akin to that of the third and fourth lines follows. The chorus treads along a I–IV–I–I^{7}–IV (IV#°)–I–V^{7}–I progression, somewhat similar to the stanza's first half.

== Release and legacy ==
An advertisement in the Chicago Tribune of November 1, 1862

"Grafted into the Army" was published by Root & Cady in 1862, possibly around October. (Note: About the date, Richard S. Hill's chronology of Work's publications does not state when "Grafted into the Army" was released. On the other hand, Spaeth writes that two of Work's pieces made the 1862 hit parade, one of them being "Grafted into the Army", and a Chicago Tribune piece published on October 30, 1862, promotes the song as part of Root & Cady's "budget of new music just issued". The Root & Cady detail is sourced from Hill and Spaeth.) The sheet music's title page presents an old Irish woman holding a pair of patched pants that were once Jimmy's – her son who enrolled in the military. The song attained great success and invited some parodies and imitations; Carder writes that it "reinforced [troops'] negative attitude about conscription". In 1864, the Democratic Party inserted it in a book of songs excoriating Republicans' acts in the war, alongside such pieces as an attack on the Emancipation Proclamation named "I Am Fighting for the Nigger". According to a 1917 Oregonian piece, "Grafted into the Army" was sung ubiquitously to mock unwilling draftees. The aforementioned New Orleans States article says it was a minstrel show staple; the singer, often clad in women's clothing, would exhibit an ornamented pair of pants during the performance. Around the Civil War's end, William A. Field wrote a response to Work's song titled "He's Got His Discharge from the Army" that commended Jimmy's service:

My Jimmy's got home, I am ever so glad,
He's got his discharge from the army,
He behaved himself well and was a brave lad,
So he got his discharge from the army.

The American musician Frank Luther, joined by Zora Layman and the Century Quartet, recorded "Grafted into the Army" on their 1939 album Songs of the North In the War Between the States. A Time magazine review said of the album in general: "Sung with neither smirk nor schmalz ... these songs give a clearer glimpse of the old-time U. S. than many a ponderous history book." As part of a Dartmouth College exhibit about the Civil War's cultural effects, the song was chosen as one of five pieces that display how women living through the war were represented in artistic works of the time.
