= Jam Jams =

Canadian sandwich cookie

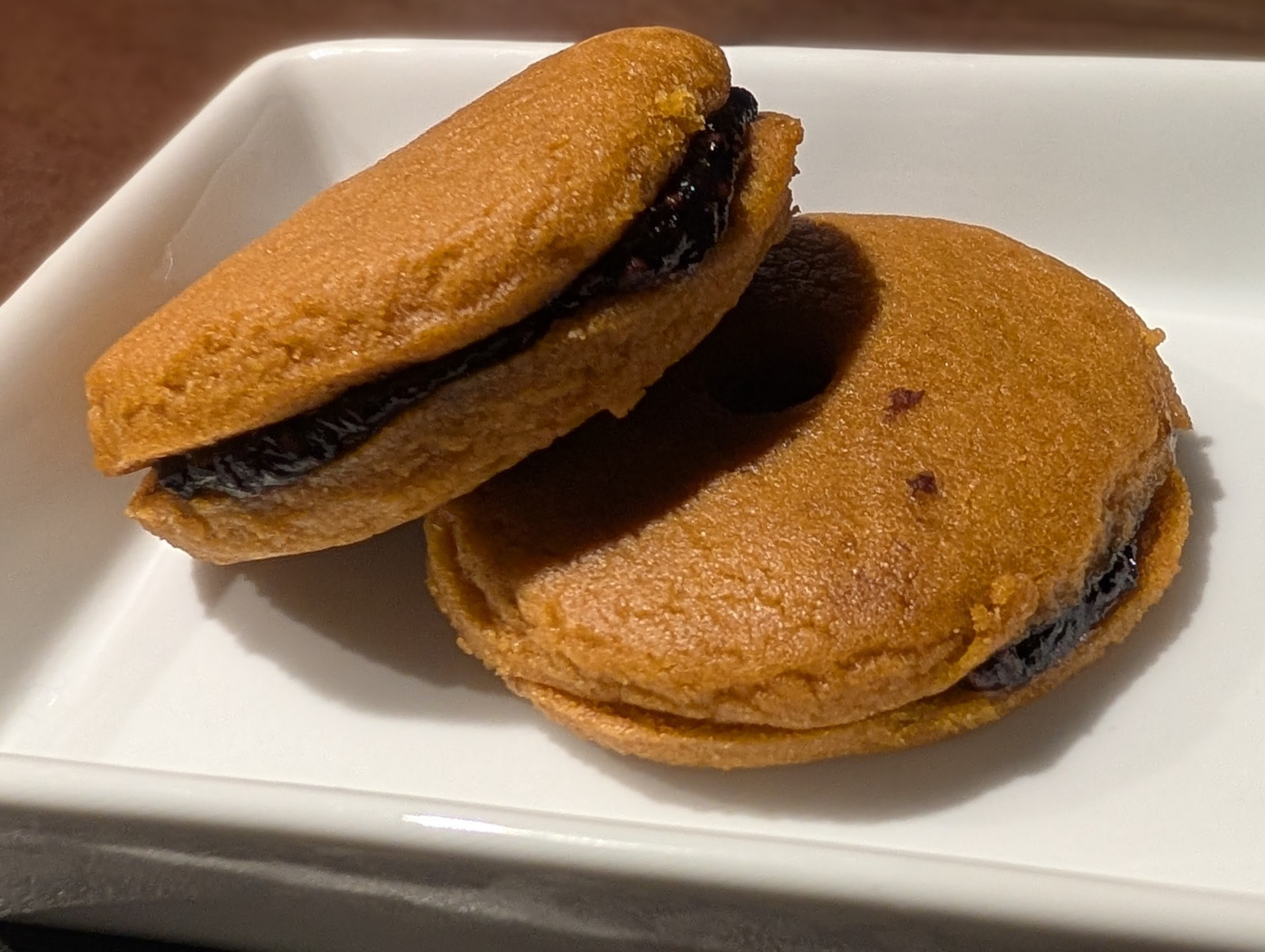
- Type: Cookie
- Place of origin: Canada
- Region or state: Newfoundland and Labrador
- Created by: Purity Factories
- Serving temperature: Room temperature
- Main ingredients: Molasses, brown sugar, jam

A Jam Jam is a Canadian sandwich cookie that originated in eastern Canada. Each cookie consists of two soft wafers made with molasses and/or brown sugar, sandwiched together with jam filling. While enjoyed throughout Canada, they are particularly iconic in Newfoundland and Labrador, where they have become embedded in local culture.

== Description ==
Traditional Jam Jams are made with either molasses or brown sugar. The cookies have a cakey texture and are filled with various jams, including raspberry, partridgeberry (lingonberry), bakeapple (cloudberry), or apple. The commercial version produced by Purity Factories uses an apple-based filling. Regional variations exist in both recipe and appearance, with some versions featuring a decorative hole in the top cookie to showcase the jam filling.

== History ==
Jam Jams first appeared in Canadian community cookbooks during the 1930s, with early recipes found in both the Winnipeg Public Schools Home Economics cookbook and the Stayner Sun in Ontario. The cookies gained widespread popularity in the 1950s when Purity Factories of St. John's, Newfoundland began mass-producing them at their new Blackmarsh Road facility.

== Cultural Impact ==
Jam Jams hold particular significance in Newfoundland culture, where they are a part of traditional tea time gatherings. They remain one of Purity's best-selling products, alongside their Ginger Snaps, Cream Crackers, and Hard Bread. Today, Jam Jams are a staple at bake sales, family gatherings, and holiday celebrations throughout eastern Canada. While Purity's commercial version is now distributed across Canada and the United States, many families continue to make their own versions using recipes passed down through generations.

== See also ==
- Canadian cuisine
- List of cookies
- Jammie Dodgers
- Linzer cookie
