= Hardtack =

Dense biscuit often for naval and military use

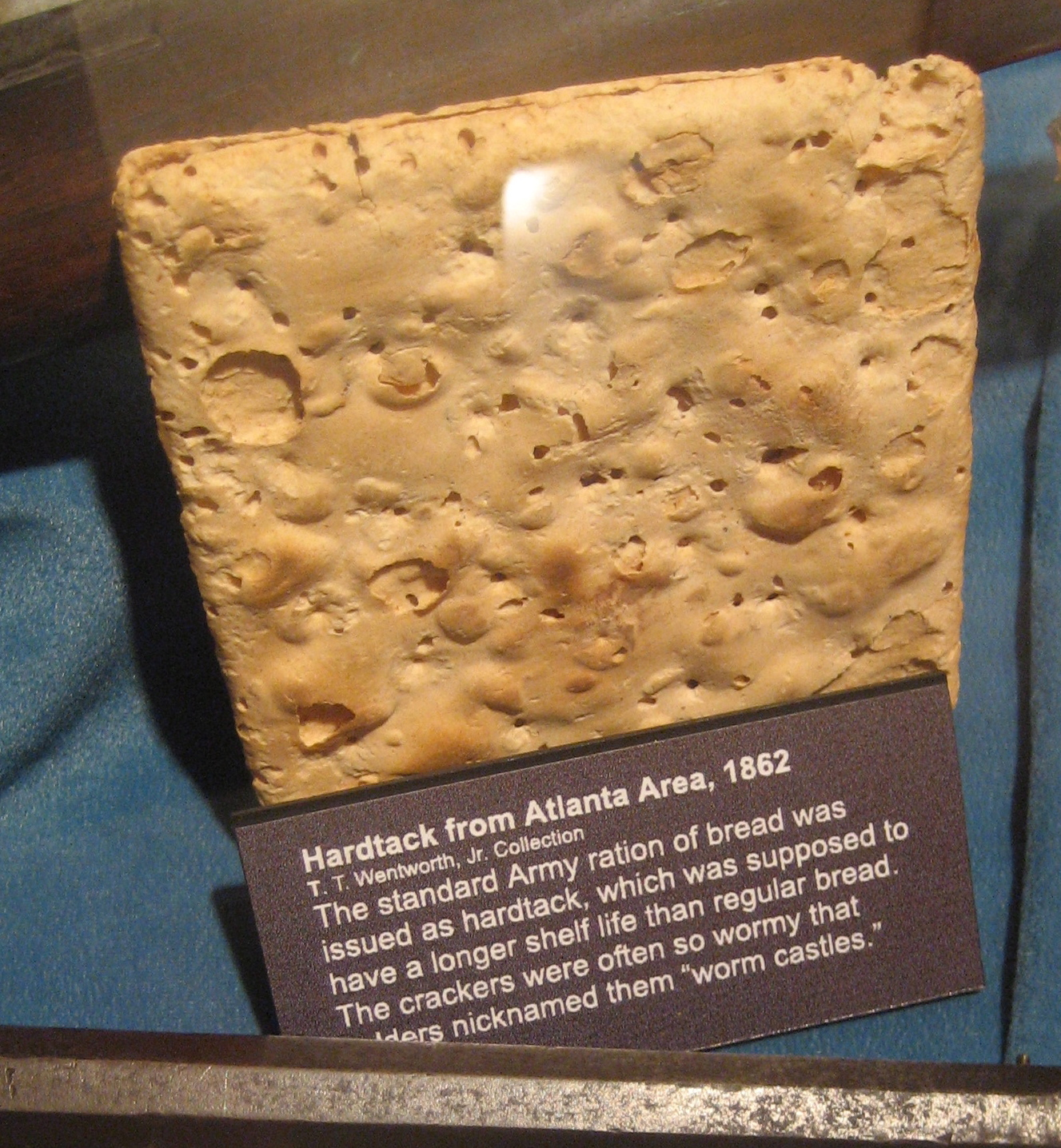
- Preserved hardtack from the U.S. Civil War, Pensacola Museum of History, Florida
- Alternative names: ANZAC wafers, brewis, cabin bread, dog biscuit, molar breakers, pilot bread, sea biscuit, sea bread, sheet iron, ship's biscuit, shipbiscuit, tooth dullers, worm castles
- Type: Cracker (American English) or biscuit (British English)
- Main ingredients: Flour, water

Hardtack (or hard tack) is a type of dense cracker made from flour and small amounts of water, with salt being sometimes added. Hardtack is very inexpensive and long-lasting if kept dry, allowing it to be used for sustenance in the absence of perishable foods. It is commonly used during long sea voyages, land migrations, and military campaigns. Along with salt pork and corned beef, hardtack was a standard ration for many militaries and navies from the 17th to the early 20th centuries.

== Etymology ==
The name is derived from "tack", the British sailor slang for food. The earliest use of the term recorded by the Oxford English Dictionary is from 1830.

It is known by other names including brewis (possibly a cognate with "brose"), cabin bread, pilot bread, sea biscuit, soda crackers, sea bread (as rations for sailors), ship's biscuit, and pejoratively as dog biscuits, molar breakers, sheet iron, tooth dullers, weevil hardtack, Panzerplatten ("armor plates"; Germany) and worm castles. Australian and New Zealand military personnel knew them with some sarcasm as ANZAC wafers (not to be confused with Anzac biscuit).

== History ==
The introduction of the baking of processed cereals, including the creation of flour, provided a more reliable source of food. Egyptian sailors carried a flat brittle loaf of millet bread called dhourra cake. A cracker called bucellatum is known from Ancient Rome. King Richard I of England left for the Third Crusade (1189–1192) with "biskit of muslin", which was a mixed grain compound of barley, bean flour, and rye. The more refined captain's biscuit was made with finer flour. Some 5th century BCE physicians, such as Hippocrates, associated most medical problems with digestion. For sustenance and health, eating a biscuit daily was considered good for one's constitution.

Because hardtack biscuits were baked hard, they would stay intact for years if kept dry. For long voyages, hardtack was baked four times, rather than the more common two, and prepared six months before sailing. Because it is dry and hard, hardtack, when properly stored and transported, will survive rough handling and temperature extremes. Dry hardtack is dense and virtually inedible; troops issued it usually made it edible by dampening or crushing the biscuits.

When James VI and I set sail for Norway in October 1589, his provisions included 15,000 "bisquit baiks". In 1665, Samuel Pepys first regularized naval victualling in the Royal Navy with varied and nutritious rations, to include "one pound daily of good, clean, sweet, sound, well-baked and well-conditioned wheaten biscuit". By at least 1731, it was officially codified in Naval regulation that each sailor was rationed one pound (450 g) of biscuit per day.

Hardtack was also utilized by the Pilgrims during their 1620 voyage, primarily due to its easy storage and long lifespan. However, the travelers struggled with insect infestation, as well as having to dip the hardtack into water for it to be edible. Hardtack, crumbled or pounded fine and used as a thickener, was a key ingredient in New England seafood chowders from the late 1700s.

In 1801, Josiah Bent began a baking operation in Milton, Massachusetts, selling "water crackers" made of flour and water that would be resistant to deterioration during long sea voyages from the port of Boston. These were also used extensively as a source of food by the gold prospectors who migrated to the gold mines of California in 1849. Since the journey took months, hardtack was stored in the wagon trains. Bent's company later sold the original hardtack crackers used by troops during the American Civil War. The G. H. Bent Company operated in Milton and sold these items to Civil War re-enactors and others until 2018.

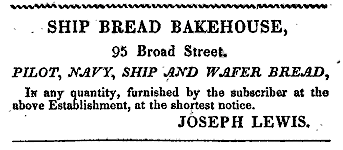
1832 advertisement for hardtack in a Boston directory

By 1818, the United States Navy had outlined that each sailor was to be given 14 ounces (400 g) of bread per day as part of their daily ration while serving onboard in the form of hardtack. The procurement of these stores was the responsibility of the ship's Purser, and was not strictly outlined by the Board of Navy Commissioners.

During the American Civil War (1861–1865), three-by-three-inch (7.6 by 7.6 cm) hardtack was shipped from Union and Confederate storehouses. Civil War soldiers generally found their rations to be unappealing; hardtack's ability to host worms earned it the "worm castles" nickname, and soldiers joked about the poor quality of the hardtack in the satirical song "Hard Tack Come Again No More". The song was sung to the tune of the Stephen Foster song "Hard Times Come Again No More", and featured lyrics describing the hardtack rations as being 'old and very wormy' and causing many 'stomachs sore'. John Billings, a soldier in the 10th Massachusetts Battery, outlines many details on how hardtack was utilized during the war in his book Hard Tack and Coffee.

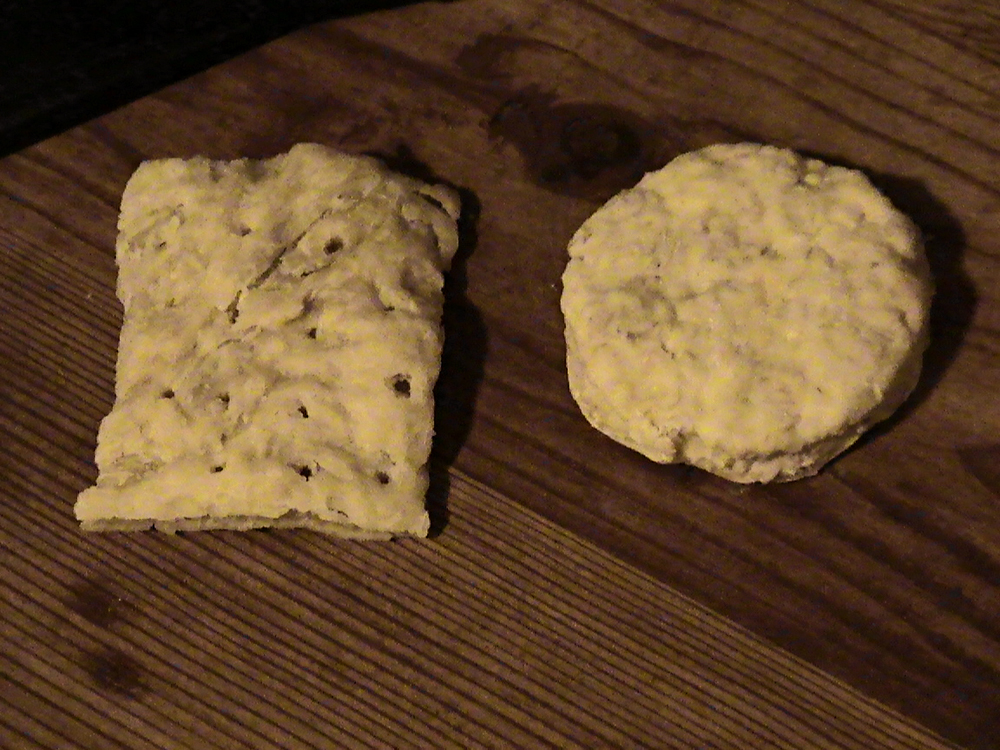
Reproduction American Civil War-era army (left) and navy (right) hardtack. Note the shape, as army hardtack was shipped in boxes and shipboard navy provisions were shipped in barrels.

With insect infestation common in improperly stored provisions, soldiers would break up the hardtack and drop it into their morning coffee. This would not only soften the hardtack but the insects, mostly weevil larvae, would float to the top, and the soldiers could skim them off and eat the biscuits. The grubs "left no distinctive flavor behind." Some men turned hardtack into a mush by breaking it up with blows from their rifle butts, then adding water. If the men had a frying pan, they could cook the mush into a lumpy pancake; otherwise they dropped the mush directly on the coals of their campfire. They also mixed hardtack with brown sugar, hot water, and sometimes whiskey to create what they called a pudding, to serve as dessert.

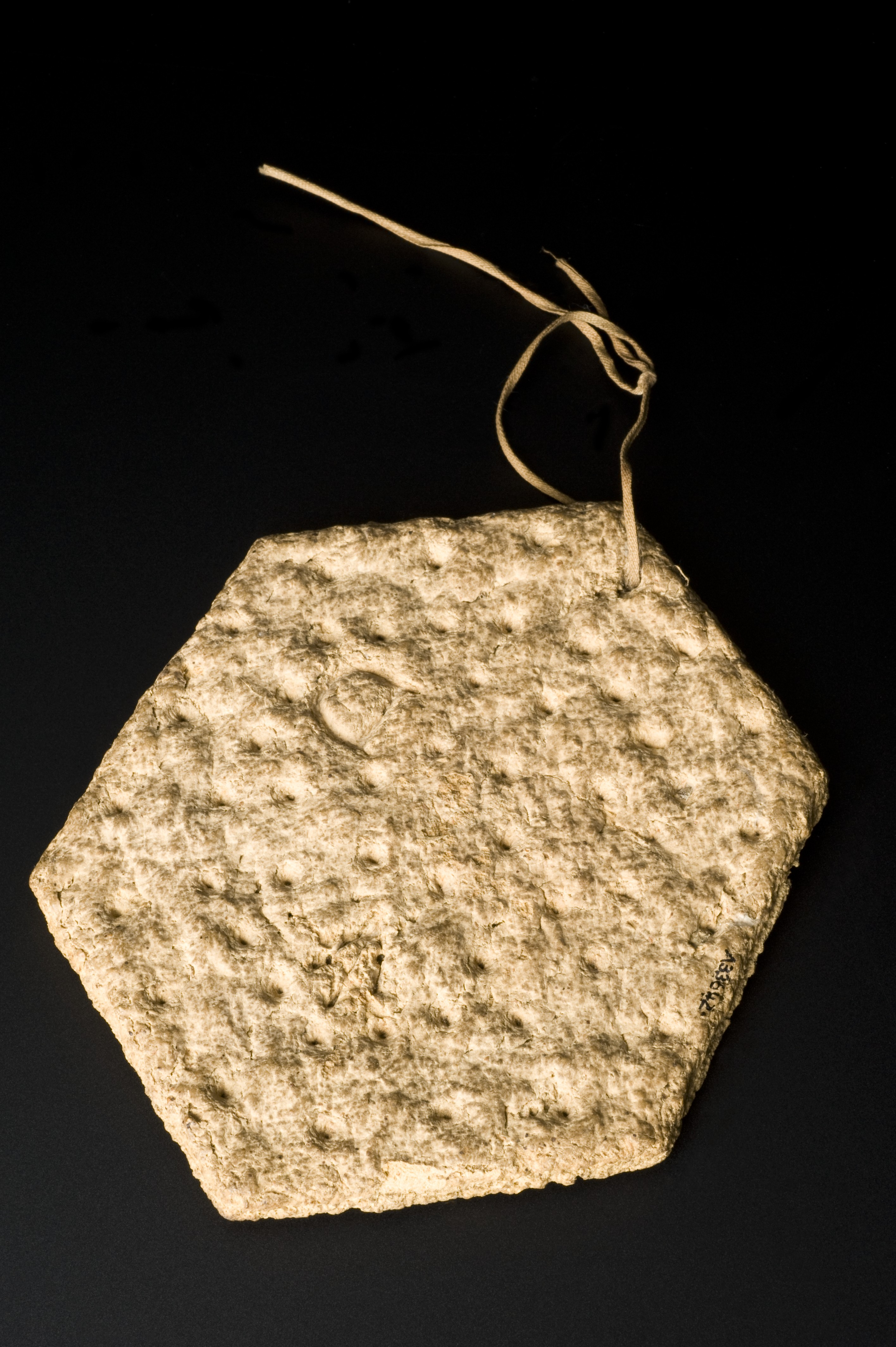
Hexagonal hardtack produced by the Royal Navy for the British Arctic Expedition

Royal Navy hardtack during Queen Victoria's reign was made by machine at the Royal Clarence Victualing Yard at Gosport, Hampshire, stamped with the Queen's mark and the number of the oven in which it was baked. When machinery was introduced into the process, the dough was thoroughly mixed and rolled into sheets about two yards (6 ft; 72 in; 183 cm) long and one yard (3 ft; 36 in; 91 cm) wide, which were then stamped in one stroke into about sixty hexagonal shaped biscuits. The hexagonal shape saved material and time and made them easier to pack compared to the traditional circular shaped biscuit. Hardtack remained an important part of the Royal Navy sailor's diet until the introduction of canned foods; canned meat was first marketed in 1814, and preserved beef in tins was officially introduced to the Royal Navy rations in 1847.

As early as the Spanish–American War in 1898, some military hardtack was used by service members in etching or writing notes, often commemorating events or coined with phrases of the time.

=== Cocket bread ===
Cocket bread was a type of bread in England, as referenced in the Assize of Bread and Ale (temp. incert.) (c. 1266), where it is one of several kinds of bread named. It seems to have been hard sea-biscuit, which perhaps had then some mark or seal (a cocket) on it; or else, was so called from its being designed for the use of the coxswains, or seamen.

== Modern use ==
Commercially available hardtack is a significant source of food energy in a small, durable package. A store-bought 24-gram cracker can contain 100 calories (20 percent from fat) and 2 grams of protein.

=== Asia ===
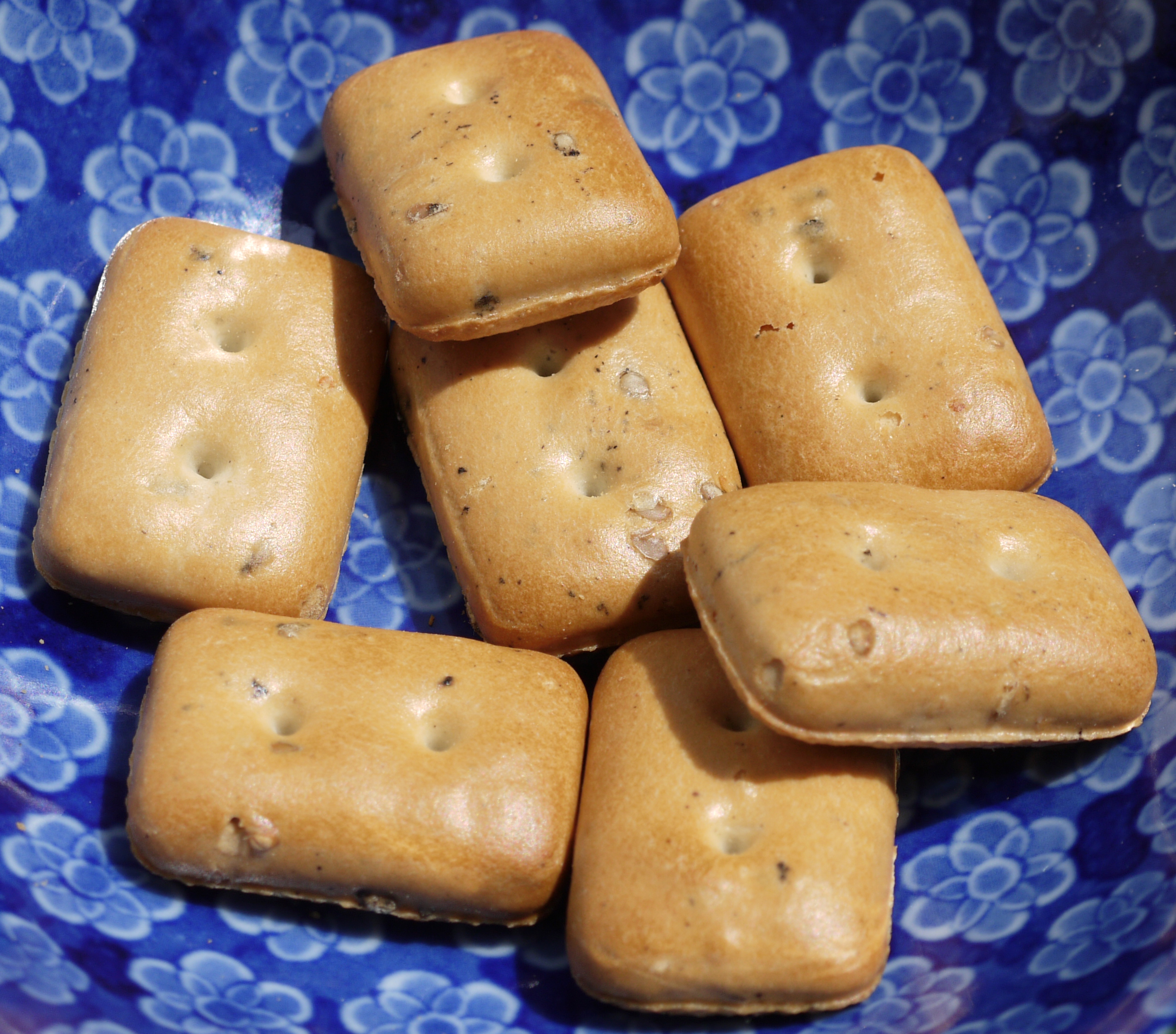
Japanese hardtack "Kanpan" produced for use by the Japan Ground Self-Defense Force.

Ma Bo mentioned hardtack as being a staple food of Chinese hard-labor workers in Inner Mongolia, during the Cultural Revolution. Hardtack was a staple of military servicemen in Japan and South Korea well into the late 20th century. It is known as Kanpan (乾パン) in Japan and geonbbang (geonppang, 건빵) in South Korea, meaning 'dry bread', and is still sold as a fairly popular snack food in both countries. (Canned kanpan is also distributed in Japan as emergency rations in case of earthquake, flood, or other disaster.) A harder hardtack than Kanpan, called Katapan (堅パン), is historically popular in Kitakyushu, Fukuoka, Japan as one of its regional specialty foods. In Korea, geonppang (hardtacks) mixed with byulsatang (star candy) as a medley is considered a popular snack.

=== Europe ===
Hardtack, baked with or without the addition of fat, was and still is a staple in Russian military rations, especially in the Navy, as infantry traditionally preferred simple dried bread when long shelf life was needed. Called galeta (галета) in Russian, it is usually somewhat softer and more crumbly than traditional hardtack, as most varieties made in Russia include at least some fat or shortening, making them closer to saltine crackers. One such variety, khlyebtsy armyeyskiye (хлебцы армейские), or "army crackers", is included in Russian military rations. Other brands enjoy significant popularity among the civilian population as well, both among campers and the general populace.

In Genoa, hardtack was and still is a traditional addition to a fish and vegetable salad called cappon magro.

In Germany, hardtack is included in every military ration and colloquially known as Panzerplatten (armor plates) or Panzerkekse (armor cookies/tank cookies). Due to conscription for many years a large part of the male population knew about them from their service and thus they became somewhat popular even in civilian use. The company that makes them also sells them unaltered to the civilian market. They are said to have many properties, some jokingly assigned, such as the ability to combine them with standard issue shoe polish to create a flammable device, or to glue them onto vehicles to increase their armor protection. One quality, liked by many soldiers, is its ability to hinder one's need to defecate, some claiming they did not need to defecate for three days after consuming large quantities of them.

In Poland, hardtack wafers (known by their official name: Suchary Specjalne SU-1 or SU-2 – Special Hardtacks) are still present in Polish Army military rations. In military slang they are jokingly called Panzerwaffel (tank or armor wafers), a pun on Panzerwaffe, the Wehrmacht armored motorized forces (the German words Panzer and Waffe mean "tank" or "armor" and "weapon", respectively). They are also popular amongst civilians, and are a common part of a meal in some regions.

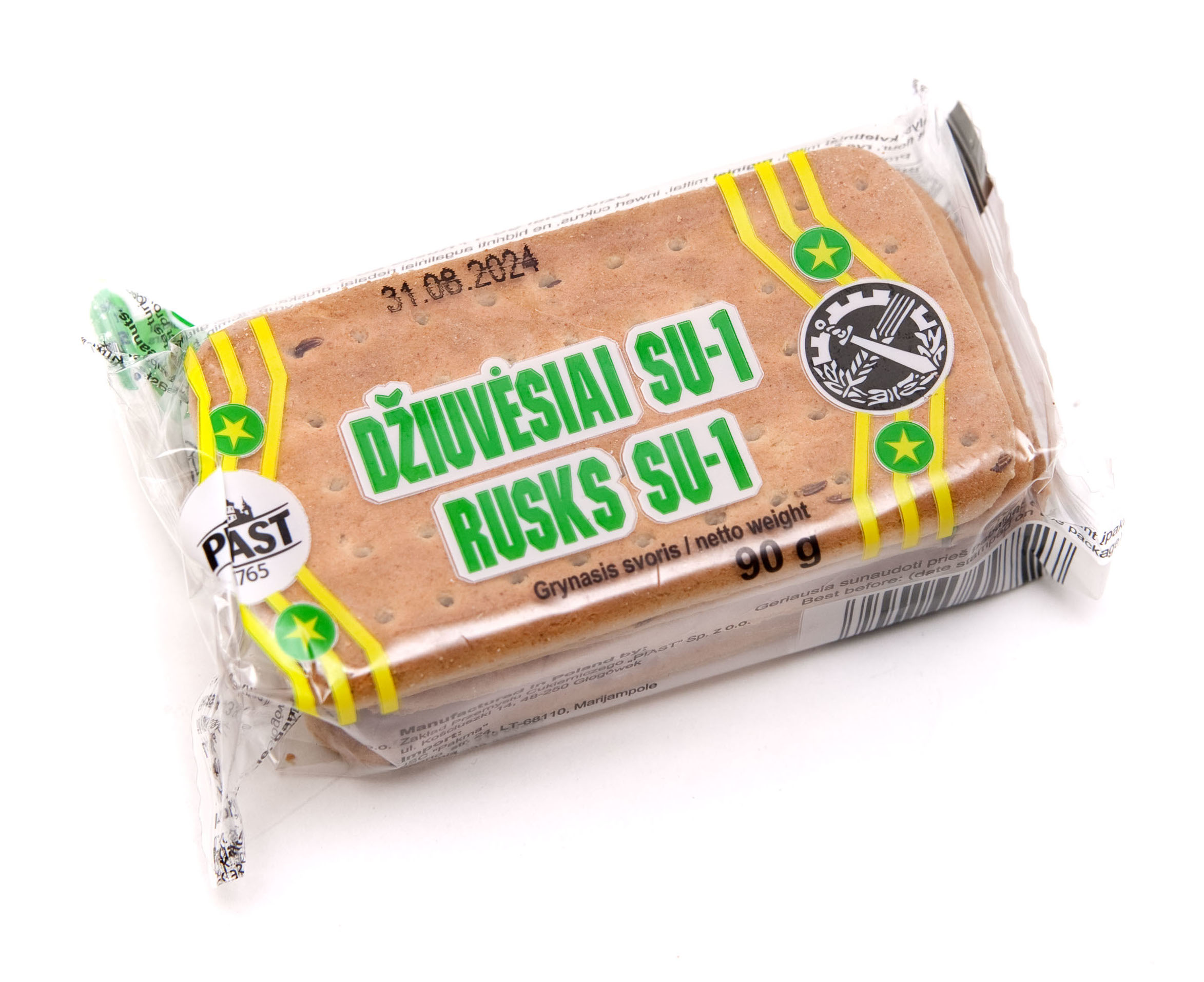
Lithuanian SU-1 hardtack

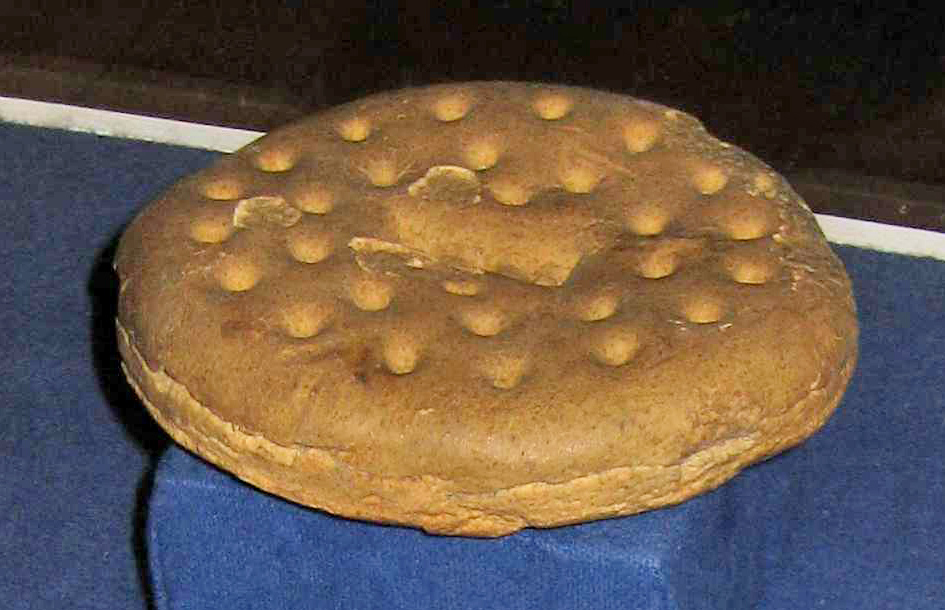
A ship's biscuit—purportedly the oldest (c. 1852) in the world—displayed at the maritime museum in Kronborg, Denmark

=== North America ===
==== Canada ====
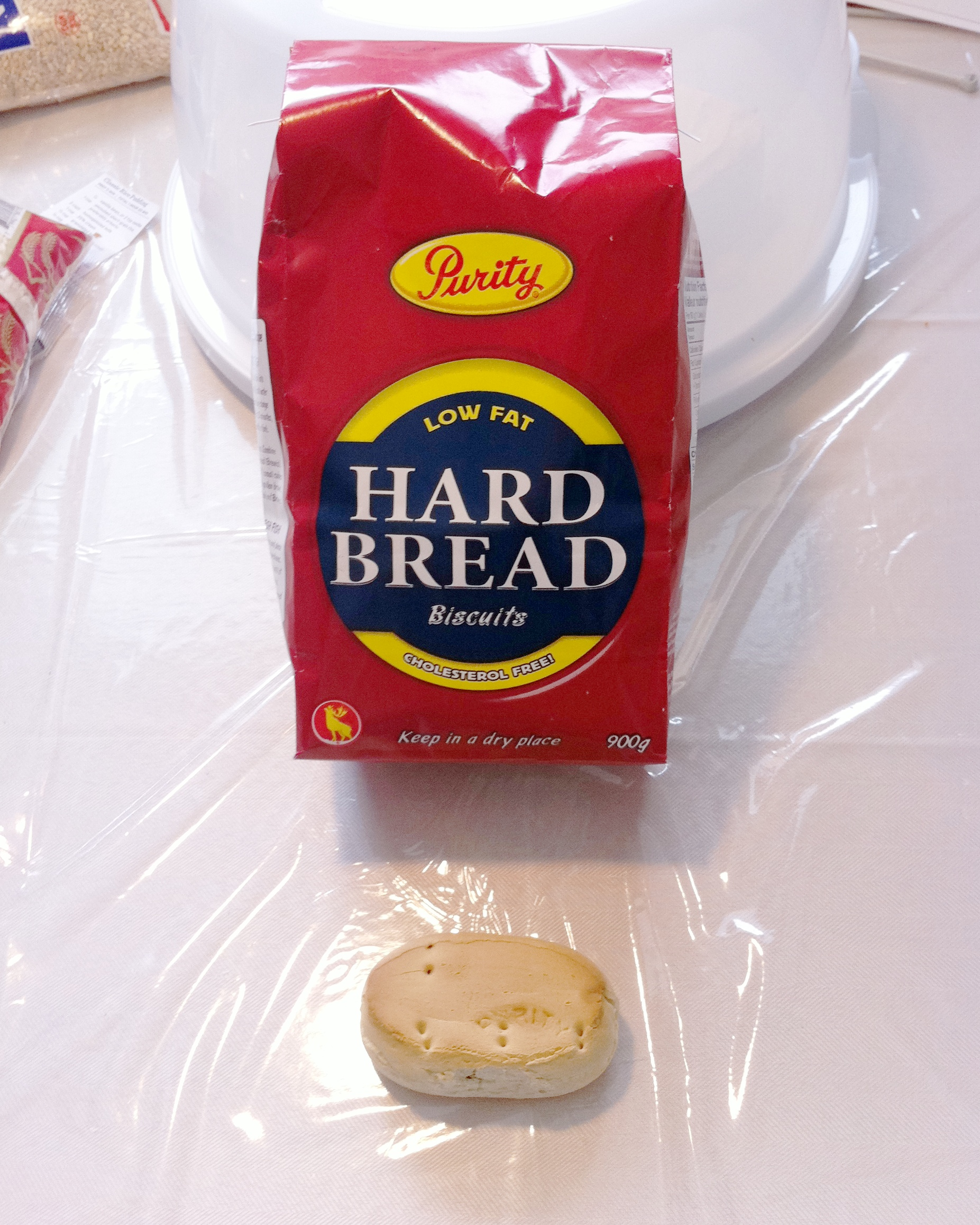
A package of Newfoundland Purity hard bread with one hard bread biscuit in front

Hardtack is a mainstay in parts of Canada. Purity Factories is one maker of traditional hardtack. They specialize in a high density, high caloric product that is well suited for use by expeditions.

Located in St. John's, Newfoundland and Labrador, they currently produce three varieties of hardtack:

- The first variety, a cracker similar to a cross between an unsalted saltine and hardtack, Crown Pilot Crackers. It was a popular item in much of New England and was manufactured by Nabisco until it was discontinued in the first quarter of 2008. It was discontinued once before, in 1996, but a small uprising by its supporters brought it back in 1997. This variety comes in two sub-varieties, Flaky and Barge biscuits.
- The second is Hard Bread, a traditional hardtack, and is the principal ingredient in fish and brewis, a traditional Newfoundland and Labrador meal.
- The third variety is Sweet Bread, which is slightly softer than regular hardtack due to a higher sugar and shortening content, and is eaten as a snack food.

==== United States ====
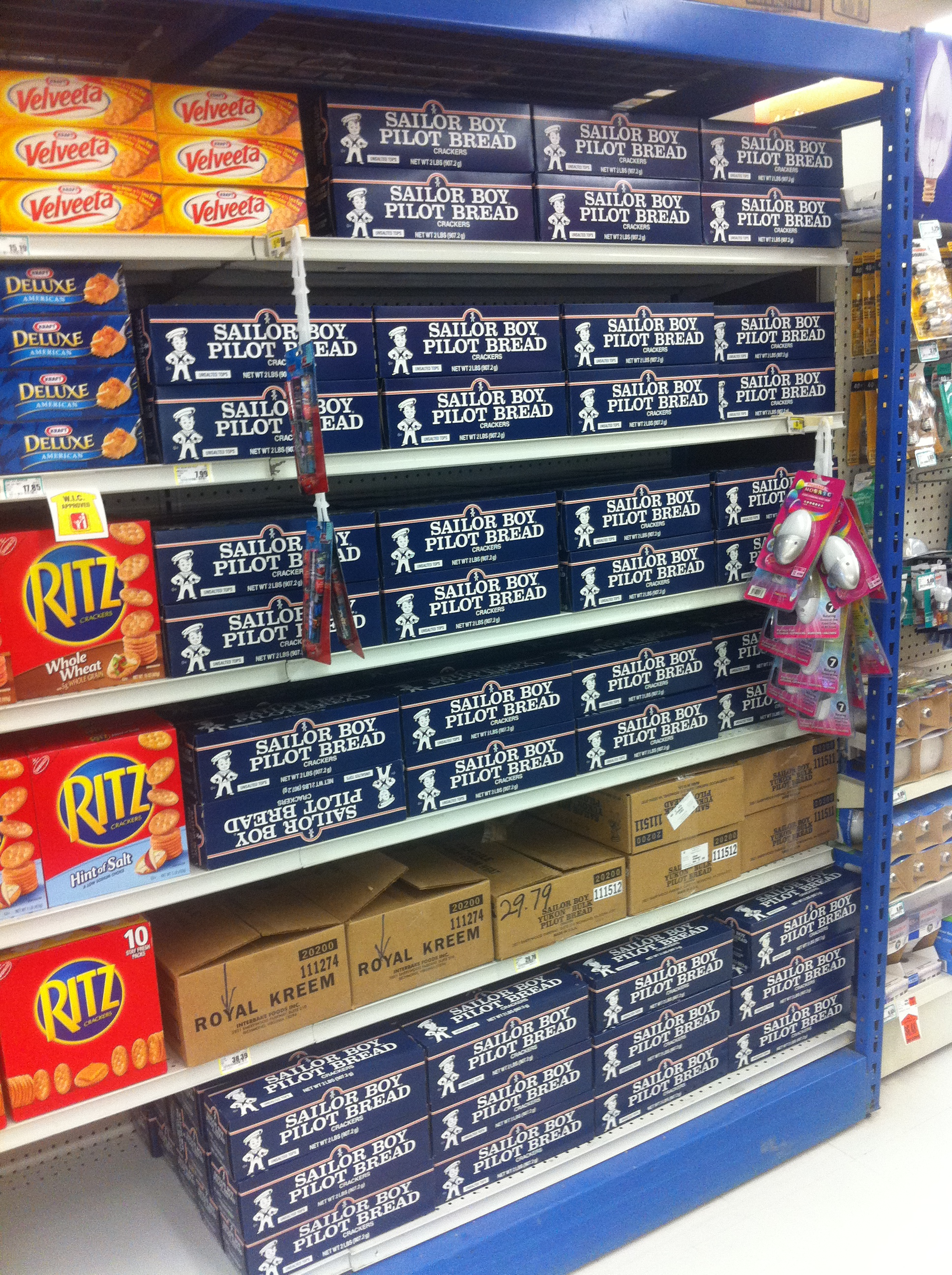
Retail shelf of Sailor Boy Pilot Bread in the Stuaqpaq ("big store") AC Value Store in Utqiagvik, Alaska.

Interbake Foods of Richmond, Virginia, produces most of the commercially available hardtack in the United States, under the "Sailor Boy" label. As of January 2015, 98 percent of its production goes to Alaska. Alaskans are among the last to still eat hardtack as a significant part of their normal diet. Originally imported as a food product that could endure the rigors of transportation throughout Alaska, hardtack has remained a favored food even as other, less robust foods have become more readily available.

Alaskan law requires all light aircraft to carry "survival gear", including food. Therefore, the blue-and-white Sailor Boy Pilot Bread boxes are ubiquitous at Alaskan airstrips, in cabins, and in virtually every village. Unlike the traditional hardtack recipe, Sailor Boy Pilot Bread contains leavening and vegetable shortening.

Hardtack is also a common pantry item in Hawaii, and The Diamond Bakery's "Saloon Pilot" cracker is available there in grocery and convenience stores. The round hardtack crackers are available in large- and small-diameter sizes.

Those who buy commercially baked hardtack in the contiguous US are often those who stock up on long-lasting foods for disaster survival rations, though these usually take the form of food ration bars or freeze dried meals rather than traditional hardtack.

Many other people who currently buy or bake hardtack in the US are Civil War re-enactors. The 3rd US Regular Infantry Reenactors, for example, often cook many recipes during their reenacting camps, to include hardtack.

== See also ==
- Baati
- Bannock
- Compressed food bar – modern analogue
- Cracker (food)
- Cream cracker
- Crisp bread
- G. H. Bent Company – Bent's Cookie Factory were purveyors of "water crackers" and hardtack during the American Civil War
- List of breads
- List of crackers
- Matzo
- Meal, Ready-to-Eat
- Pemmican
- Rusk
- Saltine cracker
- Tsampa
- Water biscuit
- Zwieback
