= Jammie Dodgers =

British jam-filled shortcake biscuit

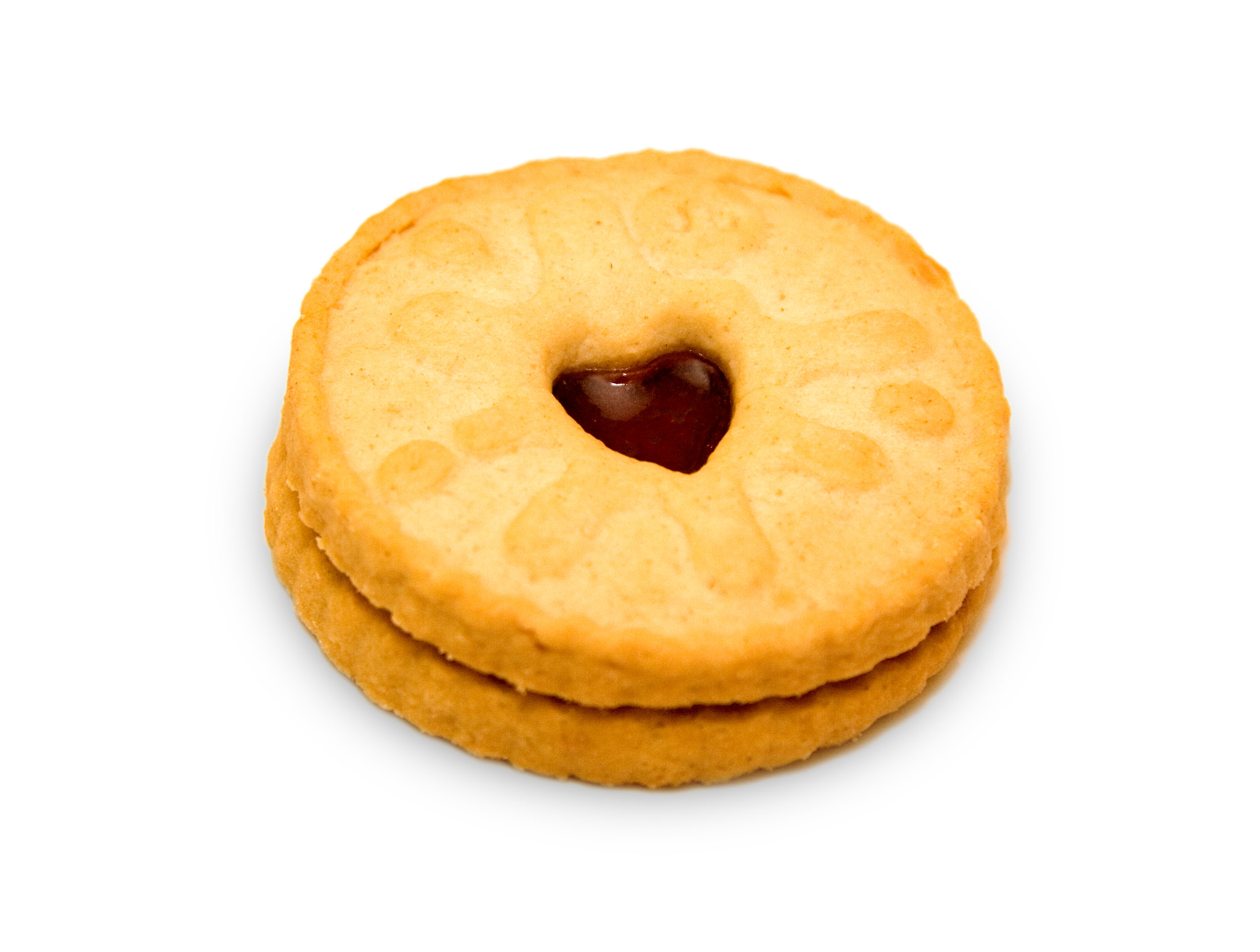
- Alternative names: Linzer cookie
- Type: Biscuit
- Place of origin: United Kingdom
- Associated cuisine: British
- Created by: Burton's Biscuit Company
- Invented: 1960
- Main ingredients: Wheat flour, raspberries or strawberries, apples, sugar, (usually sodium bicarbonate, tartaric acid and malic acid), salt

Jammie Dodgers are a popular British biscuit, made from shortcake with a raspberry or strawberry flavoured jam filling. Bought by Burton Biscuit works in 1960, they are currently produced by Burton's Biscuit Company at its factory in Llantarnam. In 2009, Jammie Dodgers were the most popular children's sweet biscuit brand in the United Kingdom, with 40% of the year's sales consumed by adults.

== History ==
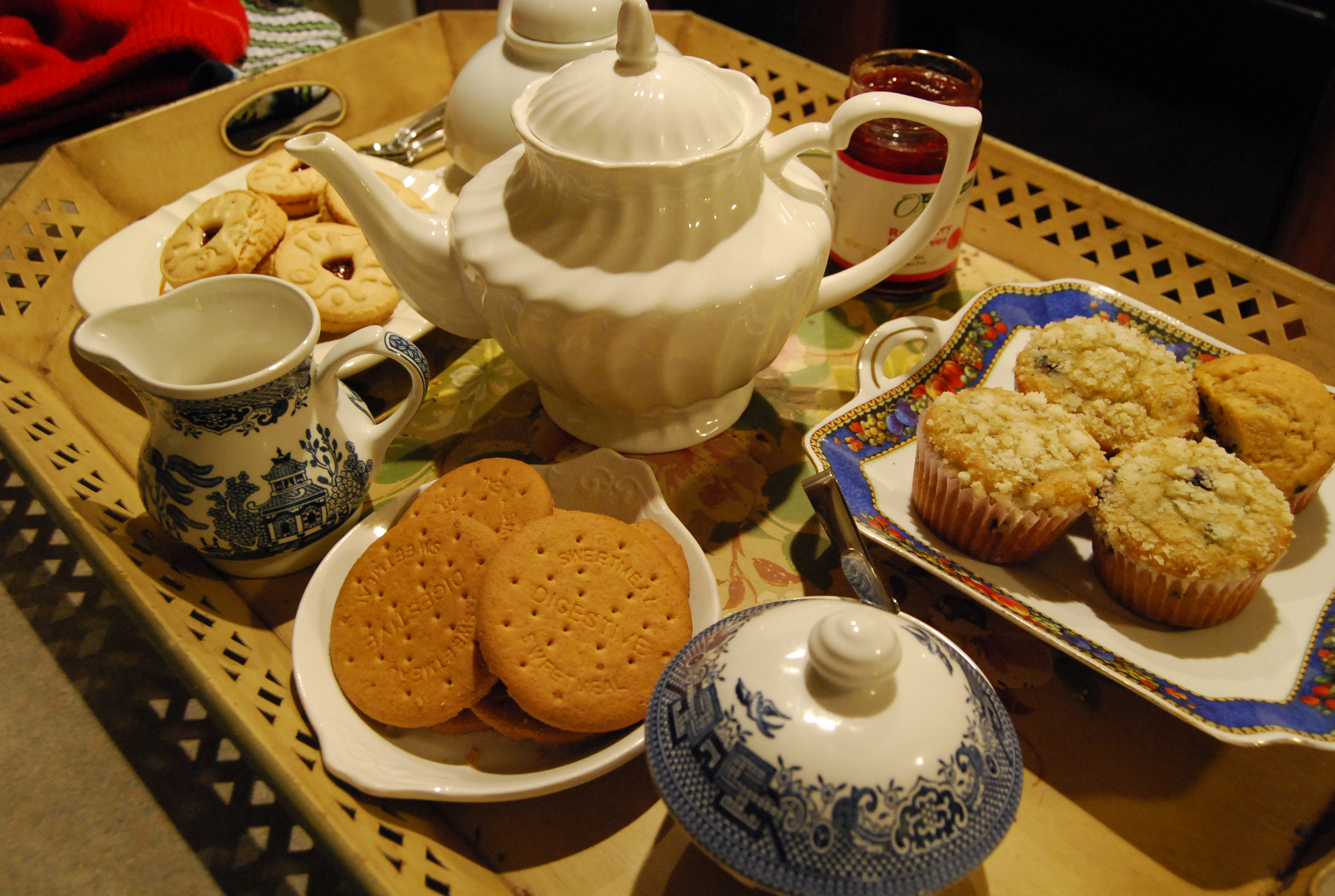
Jammie Dodgers (left rear) accompanied by tea, digestive biscuits, jam and cakes on a tray

Jammie Dodgers were first manufactured at the Crumpsall Biscuit Works of the Co-operative Society. Production later moved to the Burton's biscuit factory. The brand is named after the character Roger the Dodger from The Beano comics.

Jammie Dodgers are a type of linzer biscuit, which is a biscuit-size version of a linzer torte, and they are often associated with the Christmas season in other parts of the world. One commercial example is Pepperidge Farm's seasonally available linzer raspberry cookie in the United States. In New Zealand, linzer cookies are called Shrewsbury biscuits, or just "Shrewsburies"; one example is the Cookie Bear Shrewsbury biscuit from Griffin's Foods. The term Shrewsbury biscuit refers to a different product elsewhere, however.

== Advertising ==
The 2011 re-launch TV campaign received the "Best Biscuit Advert of 2011" award from The Grocer magazine. Burton's launched a new advert for Choccie Dodgers in April 2012, during Britain's Got Talent, as part of a £4.5 million campaign.

== Similar biscuits ==
In New Zealand, Griffin's sell "Shrewsbury" biscuits ("Shrewsburies") that are similar to Jammie Dodgers, with a hole (alternating round, heart shaped and sometimes other shapes) in the top layer, and are strawberry or raspberry flavoured.

In Australia, Arnott's sell 'Raspberry Shortcake' biscuits similar to Jammie Dodgers, with a hole and sugar on the top layer.

In Newfoundland, Purity Factories produces apple jam-filled sponge cookies (Jam Jams) and raspberry jelly-filled sponge cookies (Tea-Vees) with a hole in the top layer.

In India, Britannia Industries produces Jim Jam biscuits with jam and vanilla filling sandwiched by soft biscuits with a hole in the top layer.

McVitie's, a competing British brand, produces circular jam-and-cream biscuits under their Tasties sub-brand.

In South Africa, Bakers produces Strawberry Whirls, a cream-filled shortcake sandwich biscuit; the hole in the upper biscuit is filled with a strawberry jam topping. Bakers also produces Jolly Jammers which are of a similar construction but feature a variety of faces with jam (or chocolate) eyes and a cream-filled mouth.

== In popular culture ==
Jammie Dodgers were featured several times in Doctor Who during the Eleventh Doctor era.

== See also ==
- Happy Faces – a similar biscuit
- Peek Freans – another similar biscuit
