= Saltine cracker =

American salted square cracker

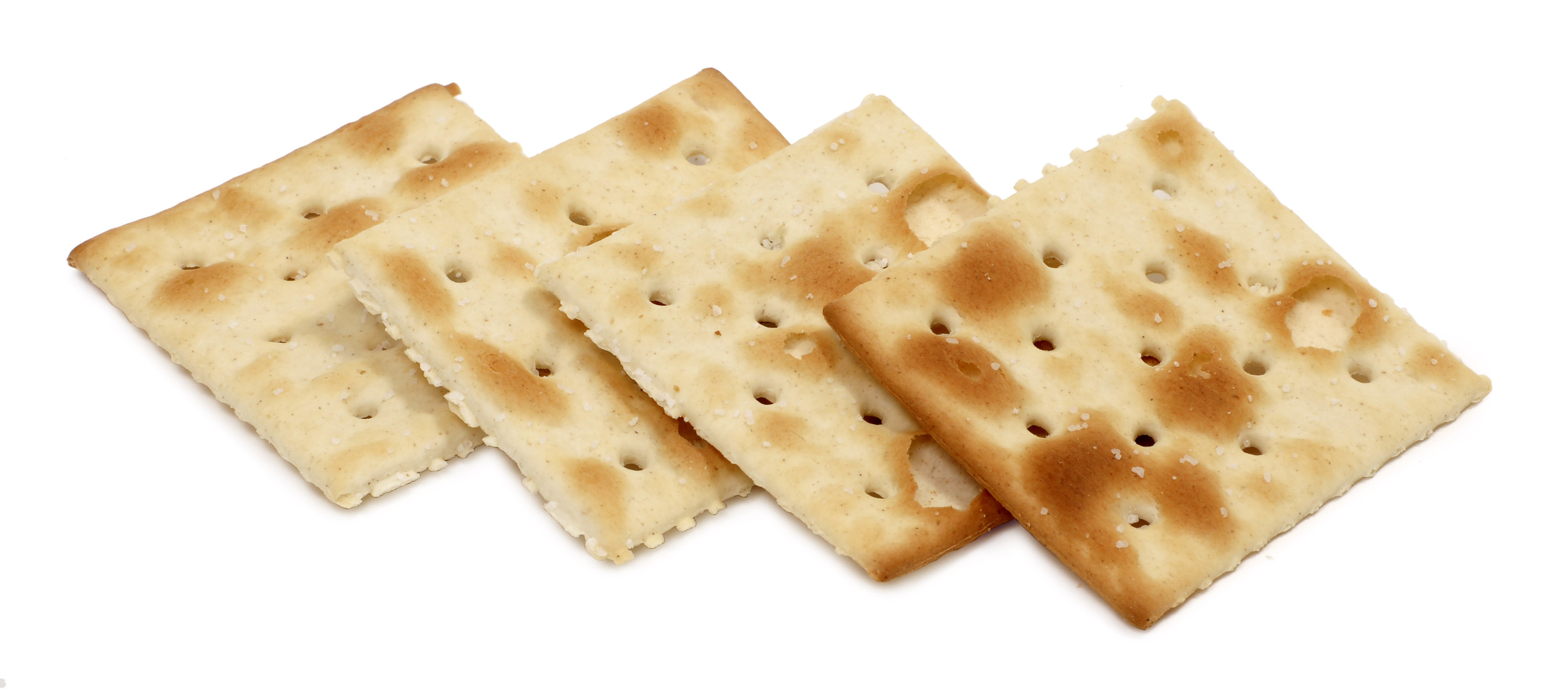
- Alternative names: Soda cracker
- Type: Cracker
- Place of origin: United States
- Created by: Frank L. Sommer
- Main ingredients: Flour, yeast, and baking soda
- Food energy (per serving): 42 kcal (180 kJ)

A saltine or soda cracker is a thin, usually square, cracker made from white flour, sometimes yeast (although many are yeast-free), fat, and baking soda, with most varieties lightly sprinkled with coarse salt. It has perforations over its surface, as well as a distinctively dry and crisp texture. It is normally paired with a variety of savory toppings, including cheese (especially cream cheese), peanut butter, hummus, and various spreads like pimiento cheese, as well as sweet toppings like jam or honey. It is often crumbled into soups, stews, or chili.

Some familiar brand names of saltine crackers in the Americas are Christie's Premium Plus (Canada), Nabisco's Premium (U.S.), Sunshine Biscuits' Krispy (U.S.), Keebler's Zesta (U.S.) (both owned by Kellogg's), Gamesa's Saladitas (Mexico), Criollitas (Argentina), Molinos Modernos' Hatuey (Dominican Republic) and Noel's Saltín (Colombia). Unsalted tops as well as whole-grain saltines can also be found.

== History ==
Soda crackers were described as early as in the book The Young House-keeper by American physician William Alcott in 1838.

In 1876, F. L. Sommer & Company of St. Joseph, Missouri, started using baking soda as a leavening agent (causing air bubbles) in its wafer-thin cracker. Initially called the Premium Soda Cracker and later "Saltines" because of the baking soda component, the invention quickly became popular and Sommer's business quadrupled within four years. The slogan "Polly wants a cracker?" became popular in advertising and became synonymous with the brand entirely. That company merged with other companies to form American Biscuit Company in 1890 and then after further mergers became part of National Biscuit Company (Nabisco) in 1898.

In the early 20th century, various companies in the United States began selling soda crackers in Puerto Rico and referred to them as "Export Soda". Rovira Biscuit Corp. of Puerto Rico also started selling their soda crackers with the same name. The term "Export Soda" became a generic term in Puerto Rico for these crackers. In 1975, Keebler Co. was refused a trademark for the term because it was "merely descriptive".

In the United States, Nabisco lost trademark protection after the term "saltine" began to be used generically to refer to similar crackers; it appeared in the 1907 Merriam–Webster Dictionary defined as "a thin crisp cracker usually sprinkled with salt." In Australia, Arnott's Biscuits Holdings still holds a trademark on the name "Saltine".

During the 1920s, saltine crackers became a national favorite in the U.S. Though initially well known only where they originated in Missouri, saltines were soon mass-produced and shipped to other parts of the United States. The cracker gained further popularity during the Great Depression, owing to its affordability and versatility as a filler in dishes such as soups and meatloaf.

Soda crackers are made in the United Kingdom by Huntley and Palmers, and in Australia and New Zealand under the brand name Arnott's 'Salada' and Nabisco 'Premium'.

== Uses ==
Saltines are commonly dipped or crumbled in soups, chilis, stews, and eaten with, or crumbled into, salads. Typically they are sold in boxes containing two to four stacks of crackers, each wrapped in a sleeve of waxed paper or plastic. In restaurants, they are sometimes found in small wrapped plastic packets of two crackers, which generally accompany soup or salad. Cracker meal, a type of coarse to semi-fine flour made of crushed saltine crackers, may be used as toppings for various dishes; breading for fried or baked poultry, fish or red meats; or as a thickener for meatloaf, soups, stews, sauces, and chilis.

As a home remedy, saltines are consumed by many people in order to ease nausea, diarrhea (see bland diet), and to settle an upset stomach.

Saltine crackers have also been frequently included in military field rations (Meal, Ready-to-Eat, or MRE) in the United States.

== Baking process ==
Saltines have been compared to hardtack, a simple unleavened cracker or biscuit made from flour, water, fat, and sometimes salt. However, unlike hardtack, saltines include yeast as a leavening agent, which causes the dough to rise. Soda crackers are allowed to rise for twenty to thirty hours, then alkaline soda is added to neutralize the excessive acidity produced by the action of the yeast. The dough is allowed to rest for three to four more hours, to relax the gluten, before being rolled in layers and then baked.

Flat saltine crackers have perforations on their surfaces. During baking, the outer layer of the dough hardens first, restricting out-gassing of evolved gases. The perforations connect the top surface to the bottom surface to prevent the cracker from pillowing as a result of these evolved gases.

== See also ==
- Cream cracker
- Oyster cracker
- Genericized trademark
- Hardtack
- List of crackers
- Matzo
- Saltine cracker challenge
- Water biscuit
