= Chance Encounter =

Chance Encounter may refer to:

- Chance Encounter (advert), an advert for Impulse body mist
- Chance Encounter (album), a 1982 album by Ramsey Lewis
- A Chance Encounter, a 2022 American film
- "Chance Encounter" (Kim's Convenience), a 2021 television episode
