= Water biscuit =

Type of biscuit or cracker

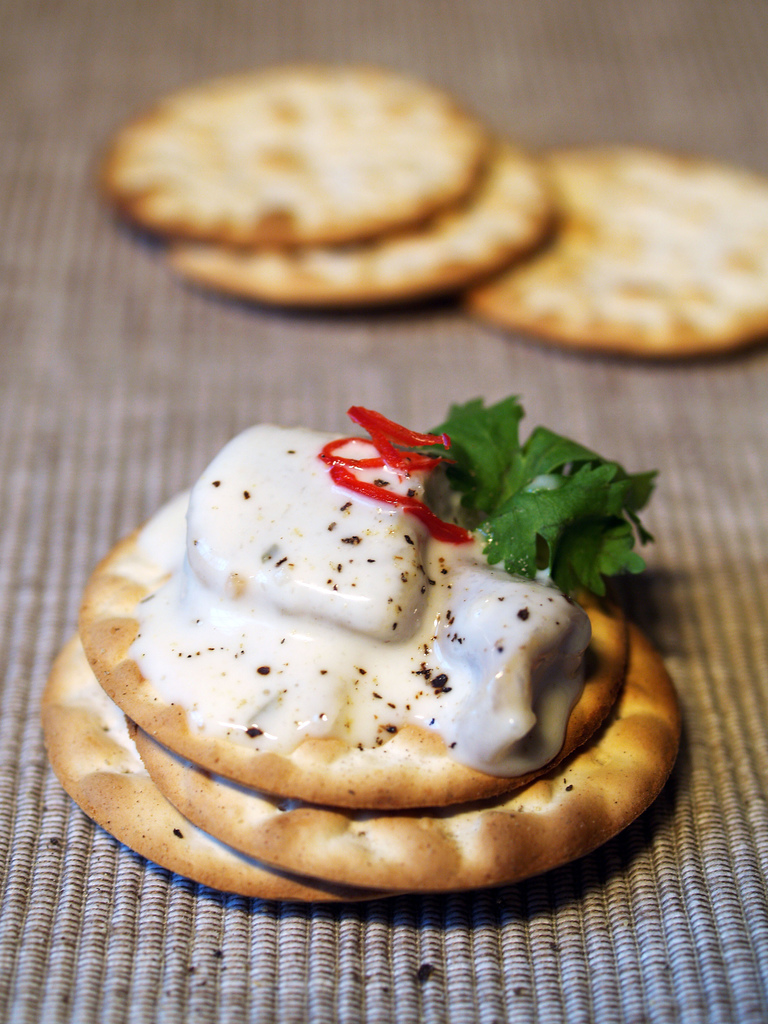
- Water biscuits with herring in garlic cream sauce
- Type: Biscuit or cracker
- Place of origin: United Kingdom
- Main ingredients: Flour, water

A water biscuit (Commonwealth English) or water cracker (American English) is a type of savoury cracker. It is named for its simple recipe, consisting of just water and flour. They are thin, hard and brittle, and usually served with cheese or wine. Originally produced in the 19th century as a version of the ship's biscuit, water biscuits continue to be popular in Australia, New Zealand, South Africa, Ireland, and the United Kingdom, with the leading brands (Carr's and Jacob's) selling over seventy million packets a year. Water biscuits are also popular in Chile.

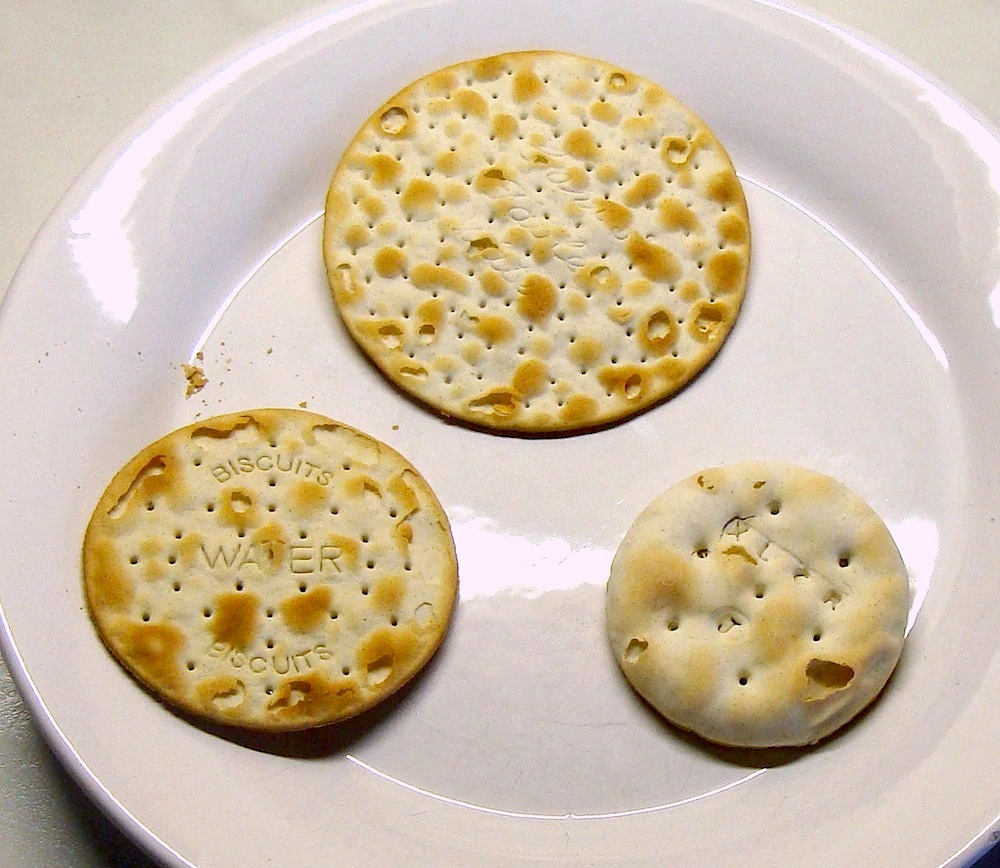
Three different varieties of water biscuit: Top: Carr's Table Water Biscuit, Left: Supermarket Own Brand, Right: Excelsior from Jamaica

In 1801, Josiah Bent began a baking operation in Milton, Massachusetts, selling "water crackers" or biscuits made of flour and water that would not deteriorate during long sea voyages from the port of Boston. His company later sold the original hardtack crackers used by troops during the American Civil War. These were commercial versions/refinements of the hardtack biscuits which had long been used by the British Royal Navy and other European navies.

Several versions of water crackers exist in ex-British colonies, such as Jamaica, where water crackers are a staple and are mass produced by several Jamaican brands. Jamaican water crackers are uniquely tough and are eaten with various meals, drinks and snacks.

== See also ==
- Cream cracker
- Saltine cracker
- Cracker (food)
- Matzo
- Hardtack
