= Charles W. Reed =

American soldier

Charles Wellington Reed
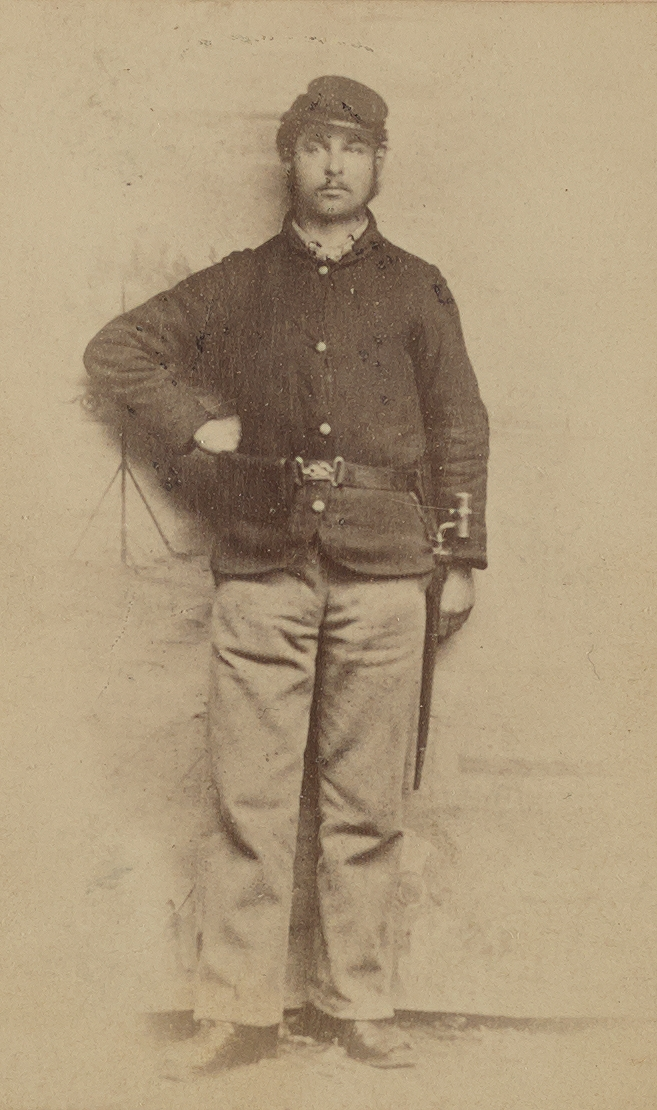
- Born: March 1, 1842; Charlestown, Massachusetts
- Died: March 29, 1926 (aged 84); Norwell, Massachusetts
- Military career
- Allegiance: United States of America
- Branch: United States Army
- Unit: 9th Massachusetts Battery
- Conflicts: Battle of Gettysburg; American Civil War
- Awards: Medal of Honor

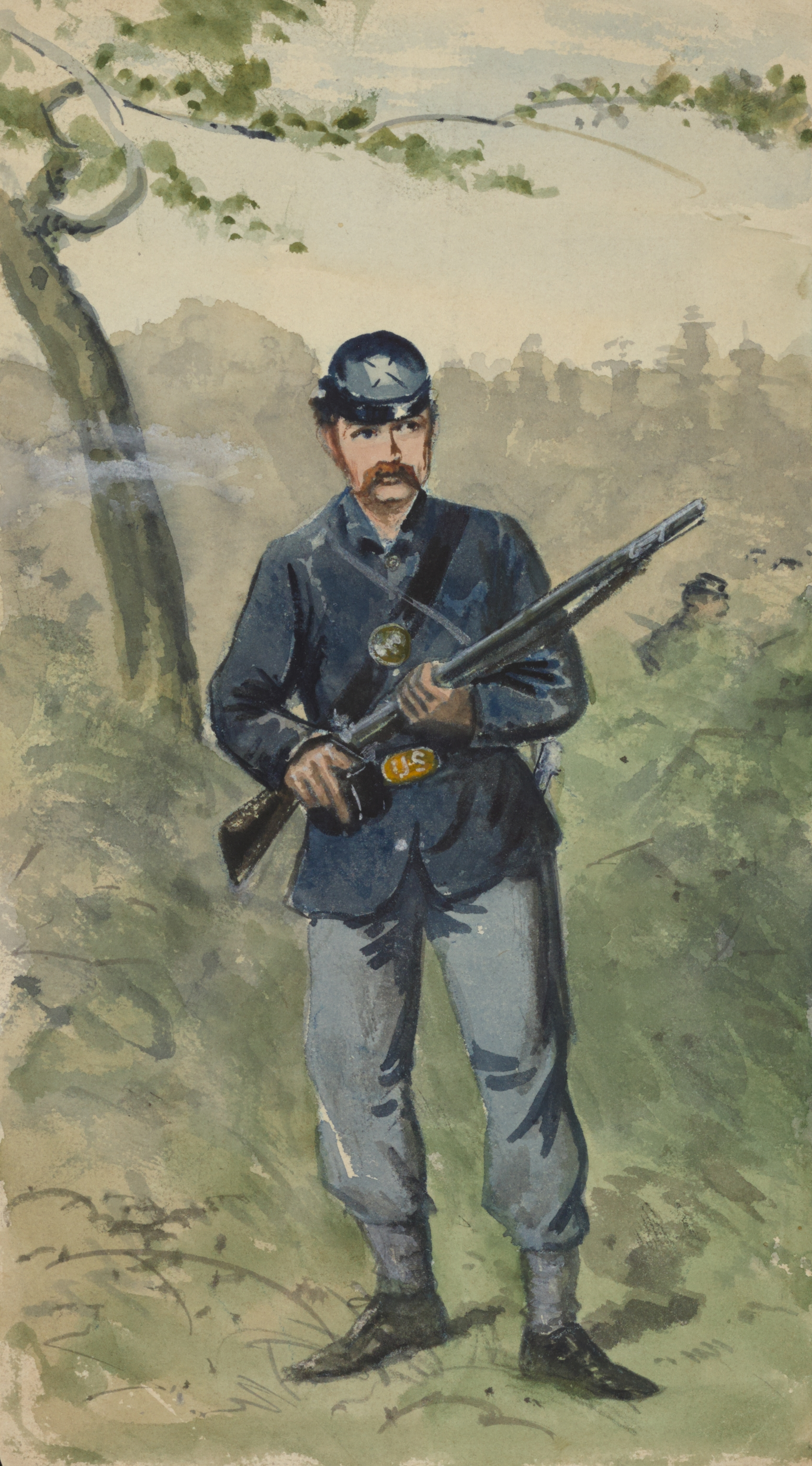
Union soldier, by Charles Wellington Reed

Charles Wellington Reed (1841 – 1926) was an American soldier who fought with the Union Army in the American Civil War. Reed received his country's highest award for bravery during combat, the Medal of Honor, for actions taken on July 2, 1863 during the Battle of Gettysburg.

== Biography ==
Reed was born into a well-off Boston family and attended private schools where he studied art. He joined the war effort on August 2, 1862 as a bugler, enlisting in the 9th Massachusetts Light Artillery.

Reed's division was a part of the Battle of Gettysburg from July 1–3, 1863. On the second day of fighting, the Captain of the battery, John Bigelow, was shot and wounded between enemy lines. Under constant fire, Reed led his and another horse into the firing zone where he retrieved his captain, thus saving his life. Over thirty years later, in 1895, Bigelow would recommend Reed to the adjutant general of the United States for a Medal of Honor, which was approved in August, 1895.

After Gettysburg, Reed fought in the Battle of the Wilderness, the Battle of Spotsylvania Court House, and the Siege of Petersburg from 1864 to 1865. He sustained a severe wound to his right hand by a saber during the Petersburg siege.

In November 1864, Reed was transferred to the staff of Gouverneur K. Warren. Because of his background in art he worked as a topographical engineer.

During the war Reed completed roughly seven hundred sketches, many of which contributed to John David Billing's work Hard Tack and Coffee, a best selling memoir depicting the life of a Union soldier in the Civil War.

== Medal of Honor citation ==
The President of the United States of America, in the name of Congress, takes pleasure in presenting the Medal of Honor to Bugler Charles Wellington Reed, United States Army, for extraordinary heroism on 2 July 1863, while serving with Battery 9, Massachusetts Light Artillery, in action at Gettysburg, Pennsylvania. Bugler Reed rescued his wounded captain from between the lines.

== Personal life ==
After the war, Reed pursued art as a profession and became an illustrator. He contributed illustrations to The Boston Globe and also painted landscapes and portraits in his Boston studio. He was also a member of the Boston Bicycle Club.
