= Calvert Pratt =

Canadian politician

Calvert Coates Pratt OBE (October 6, 1888 – November 13, 1963) was a Newfoundland businessman and a Canadian Senator. He was president of Purity Factories, a Newfoundland food manufacturer. He was also a director of Newfoundland Light and Power, the Canadian Bank of Commerce, British Newfoundland Development Corporation (BRINCO), and a number of other businesses.

He was born in Blackhead, Newfoundland. His brother was poet E. J. Pratt.

At 28, Calvert Pratt became a director and secretary-treasurer of A.E. Hickman Company Limited.

During World War II, he helped institute a ship building program for the Dominion of Newfoundland and helped form the Newfoundland Industrial Development Board serving as its president. In 1946, he was made a member of the Order of the British Empire.

Pratt was a supporter of Joey Smallwood's Newfoundland Confederate Association and its successful campaign to have the former colony join Canadian Confederation in 1949.

He was recommended for appointment by Louis St-Laurent to Canada's Senate in 1951. He died in office.
