= G. H. Bent Company =

- G. H. Bent Company Factory
- U.S. National Register of Historic Places
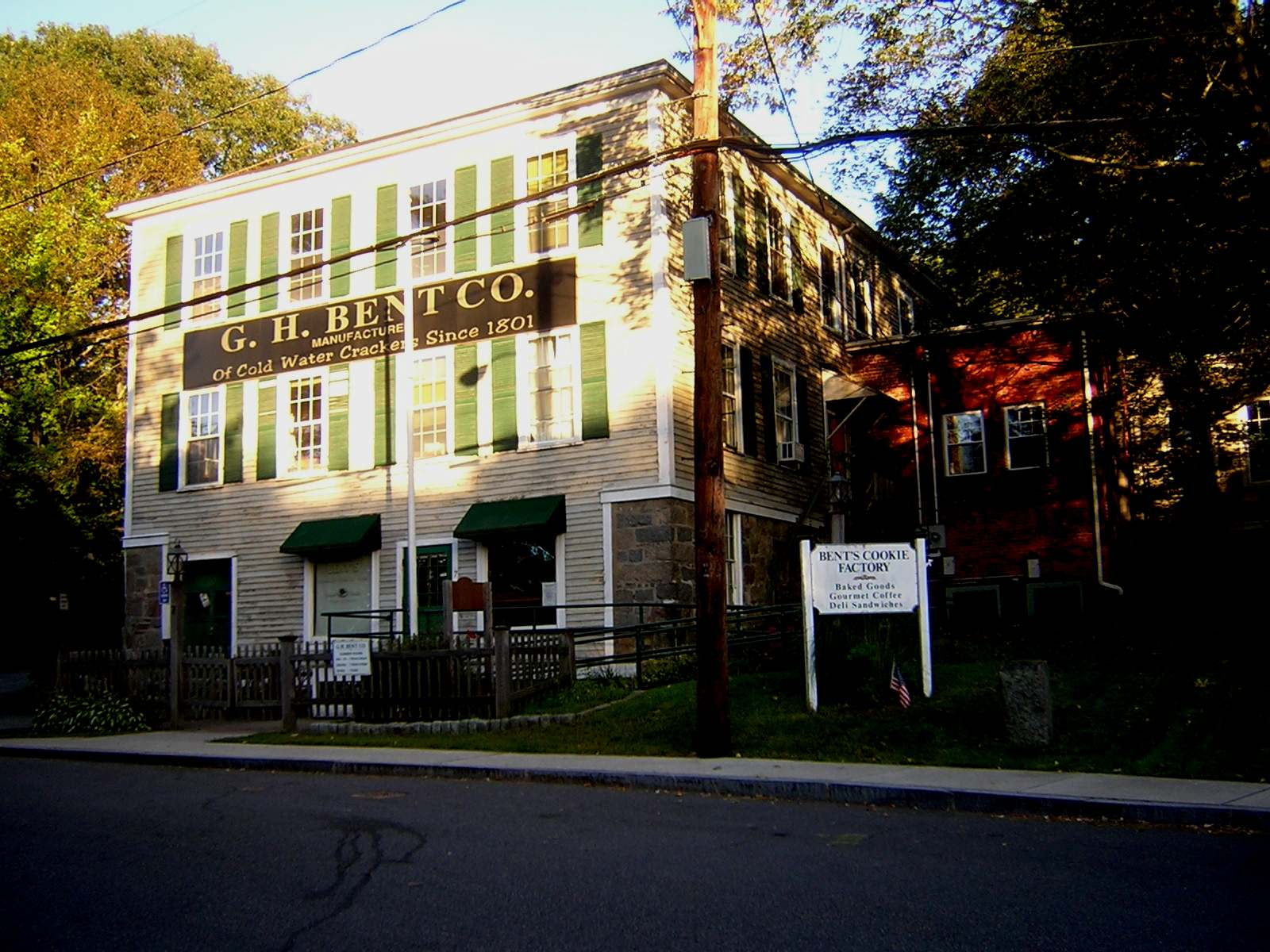

- Location within Massachusetts Location within the United States
- Location: 7 Pleasant St., Milton, Massachusetts
- Coordinates: 42°14′44″N 71°4′08″W
- Area: less than one acre
- NRHP reference No.: 00000075
- Added to NRHP: February 10, 2000

The G. H. Bent Company, better known as Bent's Cookie Factory and recognized as bakers of "cold water crackers" since 1801, was a business specializing in cookies that operated in Milton, Massachusetts for over two centuries. Bent's also sold a number of other baked goods, including their George and Martha Washington pies (both had powdered sugar on the top, the George with a cherry filling, and the Martha with a lemon filling). In 2017, Bent's expanded its menu to include a variety of sandwiches named after Milton-based themes and discontinued baking their signature hardtack crackers. Soon thereafter, the business closed and the original 1801 mill turned into a mixed use residential and commercial space.

== History ==
Josiah Bent began selling "water crackers" (biscuits made of flour and water that would not deteriorate during long sea voyages) in 1801 from facilities in Milton. His company later sold the original hardtack crackers used by troops during the Civil War. His grandson, George H. Bent, built the 2 1/2-story wood-frame factory building at 7 Pleasant Street. The top two levels of the factory retain the historic signage and were where the cookies and other baked goods were made; the storefront was at street level.

On February 10, 2000, the G.H. Bent Company Factory was added to the National Register of Historic Places. In April 2001, Senator Ted Kennedy visited G.H. Bent Company to unveil the official National Register plaque and make remarks in honor of the bicentennial of the Bent cracker.

== See also ==
- National Register of Historic Places listings in Milton, Massachusetts
