= A Chance Encounter =

2022 independent film by Alexander Jeffery

- Directed by: Alexander Jeffery
- Written by: Alexander Jeffery; Paul Petersen
- Produced by: Alexander Jeffery; Paul Petersen; Richard Wharton; Kristin Mann
- Starring: Paul Petersen; Andrea von Kampen
- Cinematography: Joel Froome, ACS
- Edited by: J.C. Doler
- Music by: Andrea von Kampen
- Production company: Bespoke Works LLC
- Distributed by: Samuel Goldwyn Films
- Release date: 28 October 2022
- Running time: 91 minutes
- Country: United States
- Language: English
- Budget: $150,000

A Chance Encounter, formerly known as Molto Bella, is a 2022 American independent romance film directed by Alexander Jeffery, written by Alexander Jeffery and Paul Petersen, and starring Andrea von Kampen and Paul Petersen.

The film premiered at the Heartland International Film Festival in October 2020 and won the Audience Choice Award for Narrative Feature Film. It was acquired for distribution by Samuel Goldwyn Films and released in limited theaters and on digital in October 2022.

== Plot ==
Two Americans, one an aspiring poet and the other an established folk musician, cross paths in the coastal town of Taormina, Sicily. Their chemistry sparks collaboration, leading to a weeklong writer's retreat at a villa in the Sicilian countryside. As they immerse themselves in the local culture, they challenge each other to express their secrets, growing closer.

== Production ==
Filming for A Chance Encounter took place in Sicily for over three weeks in October and November 2019. A cast and crew of twelve filmmakers from the United States went over to Sicily together and made this film on a shoestring budget, spending most of the budget on travel and filming locations abroad. Additional photography for the film took place in Shreveport, Louisiana and Omaha, Nebraska after the bulk of principal photography was finished in Sicily. It was filmed in many famous Sicilian locations, including the church from The Godfather where Michael Corleone's wedding took place. During production, lead actor Paul Petersen was asked to write his poetry on the fly, responding to the locations as he saw everything for the first time. The film is Jeffery and Petersen's first feature film together under the banner of their company Bespoke Works LLC.

== Music ==
Folk singer-songwriter Andrea von Kampen wrote four original songs for the film and created renditions of two public domain classic songs: "Hard Times Come Again No More" and "Goodnight, Ladies". This was von Kampen's first time writing original songs for a movie based on the script.

Produced by Andrea, and co-produced by her brother David von Kampen, A Chance Encounter: An Original Motion Picture Soundtrack follows her debut LP, 2021’s, That Spell.

A CHANCE ENCOUNTER: AN ORIGINAL MOTION PICTURE SOUNDTRACK
No.	Title	Length
1.	"Love Him Right"	2:53
2.	"Hard Times"	2:35
3.	"Liars (Song for Cady)"	2:36
4.	"Goodnight, Ladies"	2:17
5.	"Hadley's Song"	3:16
6.	"Time + Space (Molto Bella)"	2:49
Total length:		16:29
