= 9th Massachusetts Battery =

- Active: August 10, 1862 to June 6, 1865
- Country: United States
- Allegiance: Union
- Branch: Artillery
- Engagements: Battle of Gettysburg; Bristoe Campaign; Mine Run Campaign; Battle of the Wilderness; Battle of Spotsylvania Court House; North Anna River; Totopotomoy Creek; Bethesda Church; Cold Harbor; Siege of Petersburg; Boydton Plank Road; Hatcher's Run; Fort Stedman; Appomattox Campaign

The 9th Massachusetts Battery (or 9th Battery, Massachusetts Light Artillery) was a field artillery battery that served in the Union Army during the American Civil War.

== Service ==
The battery was organized Lynnfield, Massachusetts and mustered on August 10, 1862, for a three-year enlistment under the command of Captain Achille De Vecchi, an Italian on leave from the Italian army.

The battery left the state for Washington, D.C., on September 3 and was attached to Abercrombie's Division, Military District of Washington, D.C., until February, 1863. It was in the 2nd Brigade, Abercrombie's Division, 22nd Army Corps, Dept. of Washington, until May, 1863. It was made part of Barry's Command, 22nd Army Corps, to July, 1863.

In July 1863, the battery joined the 1st Volunteer Brigade, Artillery Reserve, Army of the Potomac and marched to Gettysburg, where it played a prominent role, despite this being its first battle.

In December 1863, the battery was assigned to the 2nd Volunteer Brigade, Artillery Reserve, to April, 1864. 3rd Volunteer Brigade, Artillery Reserve, to May, 1864. Artillery Brigade, 5th Army Corps, Army of the Potomac, to June, 1865.

The 9th Massachusetts Battery mustered out of service June 6, 1865, at Gallops Island in Boston Harbor.

== Detailed service ==
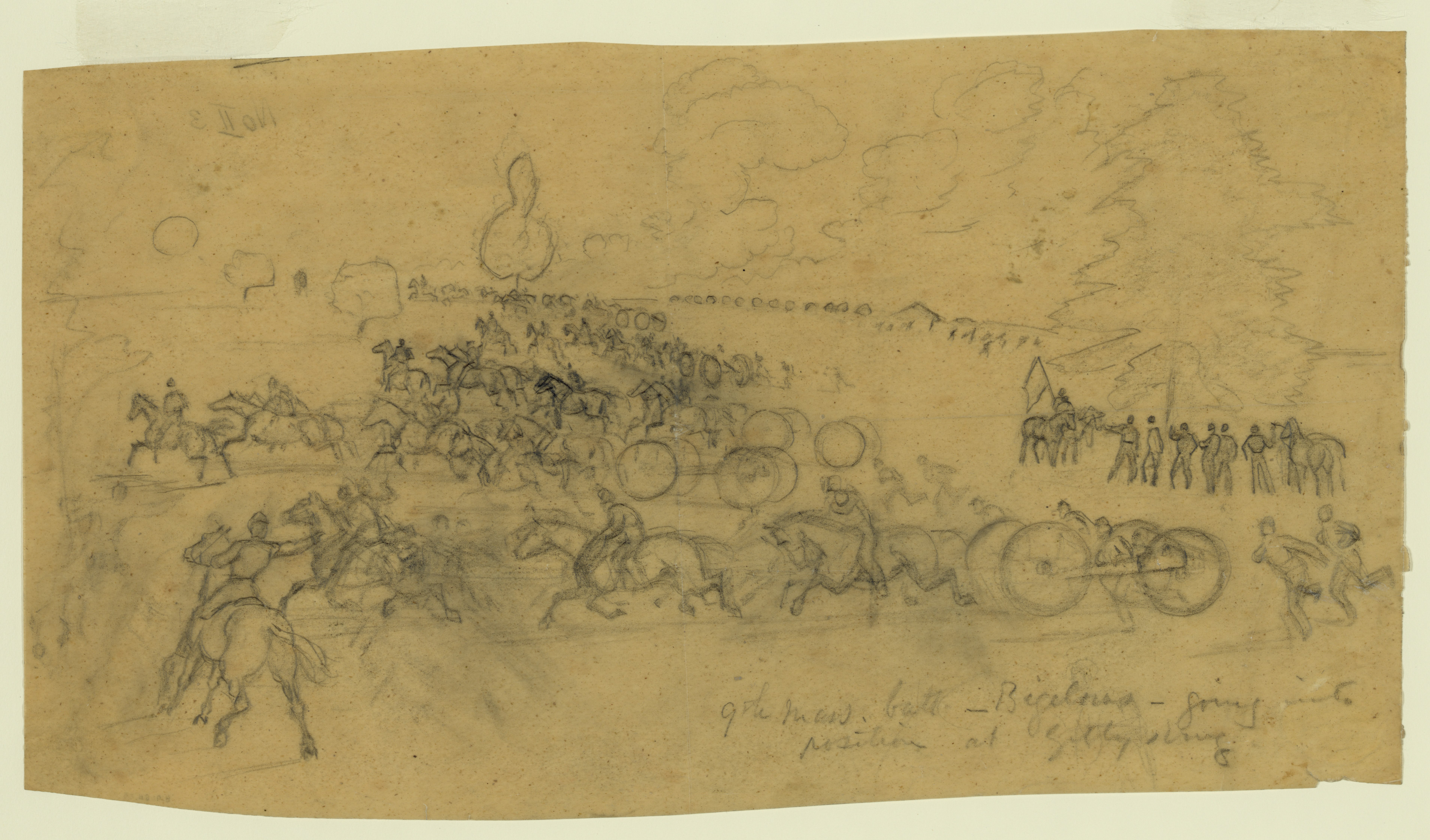
9th Massachusetts Battery at Gettysburg, by Alfred Waud

It entered the U. S. service for a three years' term, its muster being completed Aug. 10, 1862. Its members were mainly from Boston and vicinity. On Sept. 3 it left for Washington.

Duty in the Defenses of Washington, D.C., September, 1862, to June, 1863. At Camp Seymour, Capital Hill, September 7–22, 1862; at Camp Chase till October 27; at Camp Barry till November 19; at Forts Ramsey and Buffalo, Upton's Hill, Virginia, till April 17, 1863. Moved to Centreville, Virginia, April 17; thence to Fairfax C. H. and Edward's Ferry June 25. To Frederick City, Maryland, June 27; to Middleburg June 29; to Tanneytown June 30, and to Gettysburg, Pennsylvania, July 1.

At Warrenton August 1-September 16, and at Culpeper C. H. till October 11. Bristoe Campaign October 11–22. Advance to line of the Rappahannock November 7–8. Mine Run Campaign November 26-December 2. At Brandy Station December 13, 1863, to May 4, 1864. Rapidan Campaign May–June. Battles of the Wilderness May 5–7. Laurel Hill May 8. Spottsylvania May 8–12. Spottsylvania C. H. May 12–21.

North Anna River May 23–26. Line of the Pamunkey River May 26–28. Totopotomoy May 28–31. Cold Harbor June 1–12. Bethesda Church June 1–3. Before Petersburg June 16–18. Siege of Petersburg June 16, 1864, to April 2, 1865. Built and occupied Fort Davis June 24 to August 14, 1864. Weldon Railroad August 18–21. Garrison Fort Duschene and Fort Howard till October 27. Boydton Plank Road, Hatcher's Run, October 27–28. Warren's Raid on Weldon Railroad December 7–12. Garrison Fort Rice till February 5, 1865. Dabney's Mills, Hatcher's Run, February 5–7. Fort Stedman March 25. Appomattox Campaign March 28-April 9. Assault on and fall of Petersburg April 2. Duty at City Point till May 3.

March to Washington, D.C., May 2–13. Grand Review of the Armies May 23.

It was mustered out at Gallops Island, June 6, 1865.

=== Battle of Gettysburg July 2–4, 1863 ===
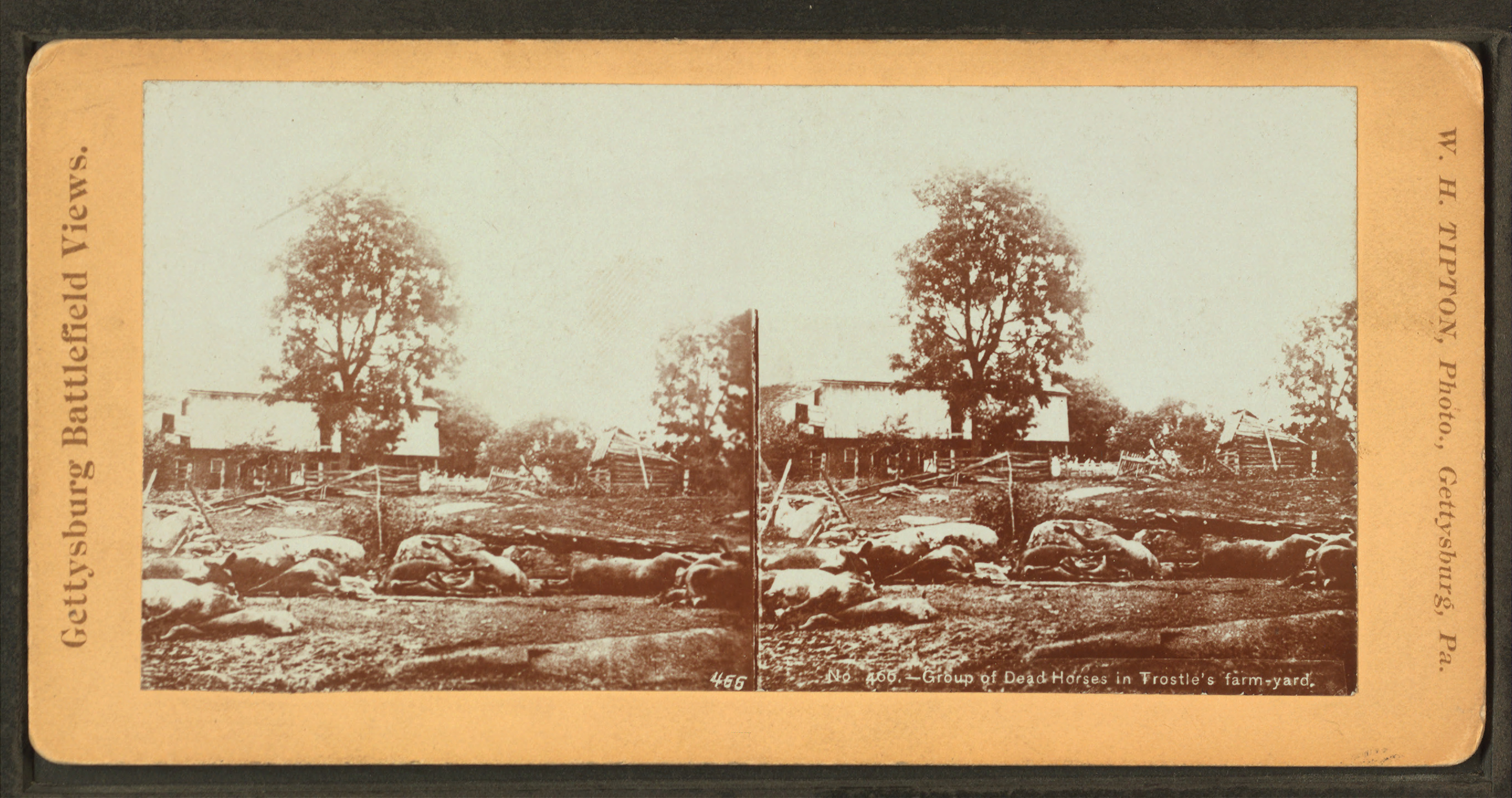
"Group of dead horses in Trostle's farm-yard": at Gettysburg, Pennsylvania, photographed July 5 or July 6, 1863, by William H. Tipton

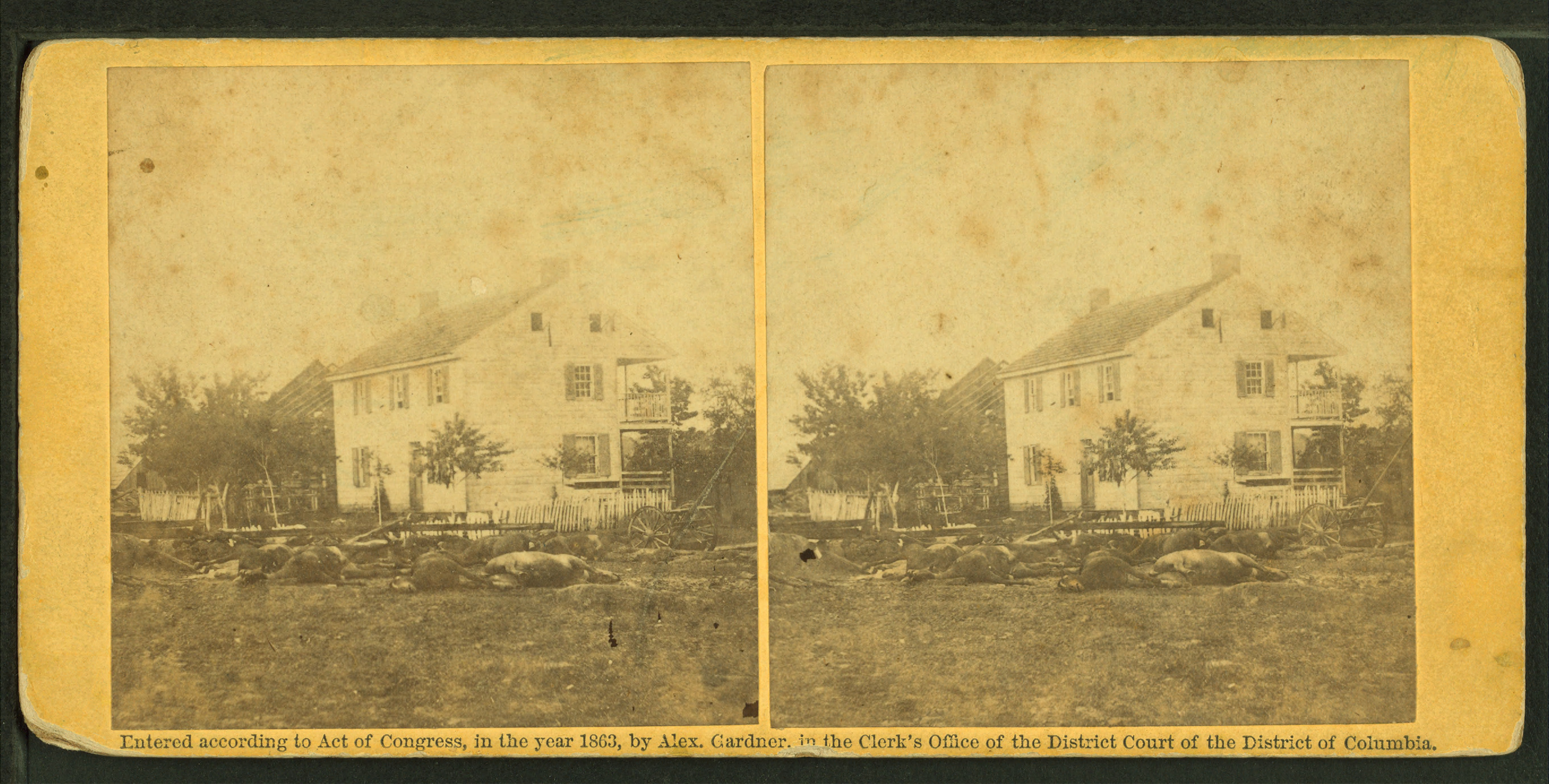
"View around Abraham Trossel's house": The battlefield at Gettysburg, Pennsylvania, photographed July 5 or July 6, 1863, by Timothy H. O'Sullivan

On the 2d of July it marched to Gettysburg and took part in its first battle, being placed in support of the Third Corps at the left of the Union lines. As that corps was forced back in the battle of the afternoon, it was among the last of the artillery to retire, and on reaching the angle of two stone walls was ordered to hold the position to the last moment to give time for the formation of a line in the rear. In effect, Captain Bigelow was ordered to sacrifice his battery to save the others, and nobly responded to the demand. The guns had been fired by prolonge till this point was reached, when a Confederate brigade having closed in on both flanks and 59 of the battery horses having been killed, four of the guns were necessarily abandoned, such of the artillerists as could do so extricating themselves from the enveloping lines of the foe. The guns were later regained under cover of the fire from the reformed batteries in the rear. The loss of the command was very severe. 11 having been killed or mortally wounded, including both first lieutenants; 16 were wounded, and two were taken prisoners. Lieutenant Erickson was killed on the spot, and Lieutenant Whitaker received wounds of which he died on the 20th. The battery was left with but one commissioned officer and one sergeant for duty: yet it was engaged the following day on Cemetery Hill, meeting a further loss of five horses.

At the dedication of a monument in later years, Major Bigelow recalled: In three hours' fighting. You expended over three tons of shot and shell, including ninety-two rounds of canister. You lost, killed and disabled, eighty of eighty-eight horses taken into action. You lost three of your four commissioned officers present; two, Erickson and Whitaker, being killed. You lost six of the seven sergeants on the field

== Casualties ==
The original muster of enlisted men in the battery was 146 and 77 recruits was added in subsequent years. A total of 27 were discharged for disability and an additional 6 by order. 6 were listed as deserted. 3 died by accident and 12 were killed in action. There were also 4 that transferred to the Navy. Regarding the commissioned officers, 2 were killed in battle and 1 wounded and discharged.

== Commanders ==
- Captain Achille De Vecchi, August 10, 1862, to January 27, 1863
- Captain John Bigelow, February 11, 1863, to December 16, 1864
- Captain Richard S. Milton, January 1, 1865, to June 6, 1865

== Notable members ==
- Bugler Charles W. Reed received the Medal of Honor for his actions at Gettysburg on July 2 when he rescued his wounded captain from between the lines.

== Monuments ==
There are three monuments to this battery at Gettysburg.

- The main monument is on Wheatfield Road in Trostle's field at the spot where the left gun was in position beside the road.
- The second monument is of an ammunition chest, it was placed at the gateway leading into the field, the regiment's second position.
- There is a third monument in Zeigler's Grove on Cemetery Hill where two guns of the battery served on the third and fourth day of the battle.

== See also ==
- List of Massachusetts Civil War units
- Massachusetts in the Civil War
