= 10th Massachusetts Battery =

- Active: September 9, 1862 to June 14, 1865
- Country: United States
- Allegiance: Union
- Branch: Artillery
- Engagements: Bristoe Campaign; Mine Run Campaign; Battle of the Wilderness; Battle of Spotsylvania Court House; Battle of Cold Harbor; Siege of Petersburg; First Battle of Deep Bottom; Second Battle of Ream's Station; Battle of Boydton Plank Road; Battle of Hatcher's Run; Appomattox Campaign; Battle of Sailor's Creek; Battle of Appomattox Court House

The 10th Massachusetts Battery (or 10th Battery, Massachusetts Light Artillery) was an artillery battery that served in the Union Army during the American Civil War.

== Service ==
The battery was organized Lynnfield, Massachusetts and mustered in September 9, 1862 for a three-year enlistment under the command of Captain Jacob Henry Sleeper.

The battery was attached to Grover's Brigade, Military District of Washington, to February 1863. Jewett's Brigade, XX Corps, Department of Washington, to June 1863. French's Command, VIII Corps, to July 1863. Artillery Brigade, III Corps, Army of the Potomac, to March 1864. Artillery Brigade, II Corps, Army of the Potomac, to June 1865.

The 10th Massachusetts Battery mustered out of service June 9, 1865 and was discharged on June 14, 1865.

== Detailed service ==
Left Massachusetts for Washington, D.C., October 14. Duty at Camp Barry, defenses of Washington, October 17 to December 26, 1862. Moved to Poolesville, Md., December 26–28, and duty there until June 24, 1863. Moved to Maryland Heights June 24, then to Frederick City and Frederick Junction June 30-July 1. Marched to Williamsport July 8–11. Near Antietam Bridge July 12–14. Operations in Loudoun Valley July 17–31. Wapping Heights July 23. Near Warrenton July 26–31. At Sulphur Springs July 31-September 15. Near Culpeper September 17-October 10. Bristoe Campaign October 10–22. Auburn October 13. Near Fairfax Station October 15–19. At Catlett's Station October 21–30. At Warrenton Junction until November 6. Kelly's Ford November 7, At Brandy Station November 9–25. Mine Run Campaign November 26-December 2. Payne's Farm November 27. At Brandy Station December 3, 1863 to April 8, 1864, and at Stevensburg until May 3. Rapidan Campaign May–June. Battles of the Wilderness May 5–7. Spotsylvania May 8–12. Spotsylvania Court House May 12–21. Assault on the Salient, Spotsylvania Court House, May 12. Harris Farm, Fredericksburg Road, May 19. North Anna River May 23–26. Line of the Pamunkey May 26–28. Totopotomoy May 28–31. Cold Harbor June 1–12. Before Petersburg June 16–18. Siege of Petersburg June 16, 1864 to April 2, 1865. Jerusalem Plank Road June 22–23, 1864. Demonstration north of the James River July 27–29. Deep Bottom July 27–28. Strawberry Plains, Deep Bottom, August 14–18. Ream's Station August 25. In the trenches before Petersburg in Battery 14 September 24 to October 24. Boydton Plank Road, Hatcher's Run, October 27–28. In Forts Stevenson, Blaisdell, and Welch until November 29. Movement to Hatcher's Run December 9–10. In Forts Emery and Siebert until February 5, 1865. Dabney's Mills, Hatcher's Run, February 5–7. Watkins' House March 25. Appomattox Campaign March 28-April 9. Moved to Dabney's Mills March 30. Fall of Petersburg April 2. Pursuit of Lee April 8–9. Sailor's Creek April 6. Cover the crossing of II Corps at High Bridge, Farmville, April 7. Appomattox Court House April 9. Surrender of Lee and his army. March to Burkesville April 11–14. March to Washington, D.C., May 2–13. Grand Review of the Armies May 23.

== Casualties ==
The battery lost a total of 24 men during service; 2 officers and 6 enlisted men killed or mortally wounded, 16 enlisted men died of disease.

== Commanders ==
- Captain Jacob Henry Sleeper - resigned February 1864
- Captain Joshua Webb Adams

== Notable members ==
- Private John Davis Billings - author of Hard Tack and Coffee (1888)

== See also ==
- List of Massachusetts Civil War units
- Massachusetts in the Civil War
