= Hard Tack and Coffee =

1887 memoir by John D. Billings

Hardtack and Coffee
- First edition
- Author: John D. Billings
- Language: English
- Genre: memoir
- Publisher: George M. Smith
- Publication date: 1887
- Publication place: United States
- Media type: Print (Paperback)

Hard Tack and Coffee: The Unwritten Story of Army Life (1887) is a memoir by John D. Billings. Billings was a veteran of the 10th Massachusetts Volunteer Light Artillery Battery in the American Civil War. Originally published in 1888, Hard Tack and Coffee quickly became a best seller, and is now considered one of the most important books written by a Civil War veteran. The book is abundantly illustrated by the pen and ink drawings of Charles W. Reed, also a veteran, who served as bugler in the 9th Massachusetts Battery, later received the Medal of Honor for saving the life of his battery commander at Gettysburg. Hard Tack and Coffee is not about battles, but rather about how the common Union soldiers of the Civil War lived in camp and on the march. What would otherwise be a mundane subject is enlivened by Billings' humorous prose and Reed's superb drawings which are based on the sketches he kept in his journal during the war.

The book is noteworthy as it covers the details of regular soldier life, and as such has become a valuable resource for Civil War reenactors.

The volume is divided into twenty-one chapters which treat the origins of the Civil War, enlisting, how soldiers were sheltered, life in tents, life in log huts, unlucky soldiers and shirkers ("Jonahs and Beats"), Army rations, offenses and punishments, a day in camp, raw recruits, special rations and boxes from home, foraging, corps and corps badges, some inventions and devices of the war, the army mule, hospitals and ambulances, clothing, breaking camp and marching, army wagon trains, road and bridge builders, and signal flags and torches.

Some of the information is specific to Billings' experiences as a Massachusetts volunteer artillery veteran. However, much of it is very useful to anyone researching or simply reading about the ordinary soldier in the Union army. Reed's drawings add a great deal to the text.

Billings has been described as a skilful writer, both humorous and informative. The historian Henry Steele Commager called the work "one of the most entertaining of all civil war books".
