= Purity Factories =

Canadian food processing company

Purity Factories Limited
- Company type: Private
- Industry: Food (food processing)
- Founded: 1924; 102 years ago
- Founders: C. C. Pratt; A. E. Hickman; W. R. Goobie
- Headquarters: St. John's, Newfoundland and Labrador, Canada
- Products: crackers, cookies, candies, fruit preserves, tea
- Website: www.purity.nf.ca/

Purity Factories Limited is a Canadian food processing company based in St. John's, Newfoundland and Labrador. Founded in 1924 by C. C. Pratt, A. E. Hickman, and W. R. Goobie, Purity manufactures traditional Newfoundland foods including cream crackers, hard bread (hardtack), Peppermint Nobs, Candy Kisses, Jam Jams (sponge cookies with apple jam filling), flavoured syrups, and jams made with local ingredients like partridgeberries. Their hard bread has long been a staple in Newfoundland's fishing communities, where it served as both a bread substitute and an essential ingredient in fish and brewis.
