= Hard Times Come Again No More =

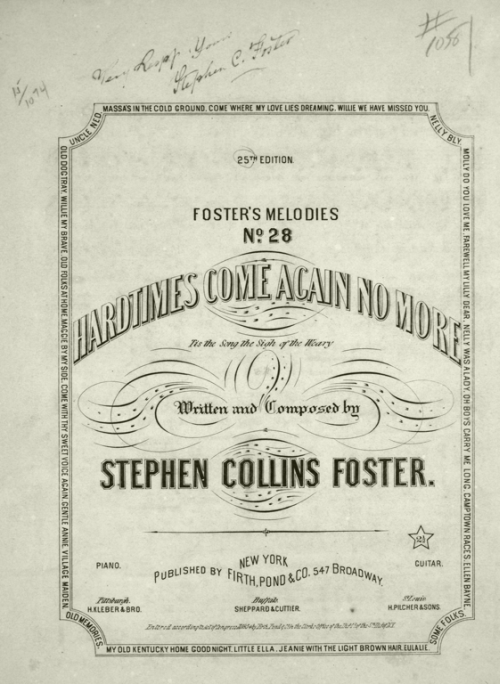
- 1854 sheet music cover

Song
- Published: 1854
- Songwriter: Stephen Foster

"Hard Times Come Again No More" (sometimes, "Hard Times") is an American parlor song written by Stephen Foster. It was published in New York City by Firth, Pond & Co. in 1854 as Foster's Melodies No. 28. Well-known and popular in its day, both in the United States and Europe, the song asks the fortunate to consider the plight of the less fortunate and includes one of Foster's favorite images: "a pale drooping maiden".

The first audio recording was a wax cylinder by the Edison Manufacturing Company (Edison Gold Moulded 9120) in 1905. It has been recorded and performed numerous times since. The song is Roud Folk Song Index #2659.

Released seven years before the American Civil War, it gained great popularity during that conflict as an expression of suffering and hardship, to the point that a satirical version about soldiers' food became widely circulated as well, "Hard Tack Come Again No More". In June 2026, CBS News included the song in its list of the 250 essential American songs of the past 250 years.

== Lyrics ==
"Hard Times, Come Again No More" (3:11)
Performed by Louise Homer And Male Chorus (1919)

"Hard Times Come Again No More" (2:26)
Performed by Grant Barrett (2009)

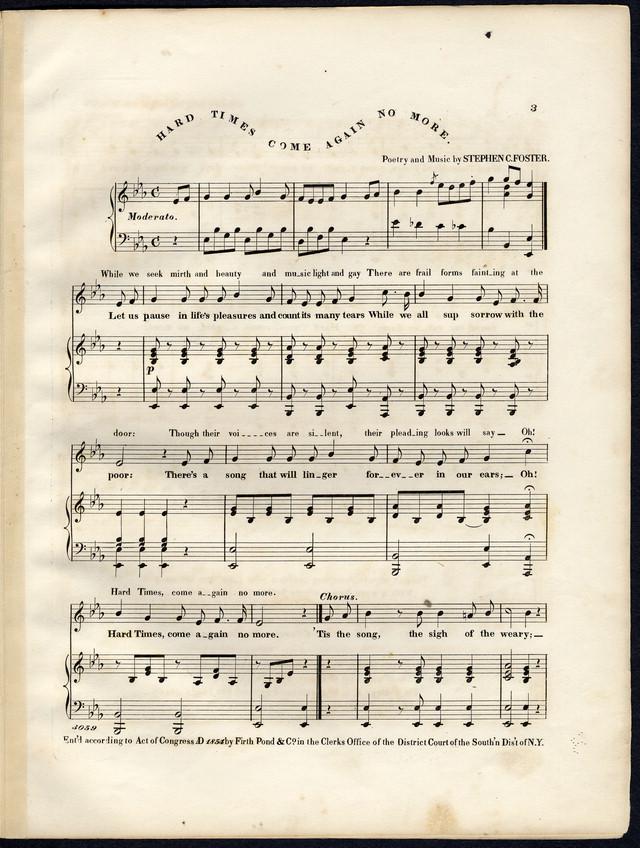
Original sheet music

Let us pause in life's pleasures and count its many tears,
While we all sup sorrow with the poor;
There's a song that will linger forever in our ears;
Oh! Hard times come again no more.

Chorus:
'Tis the song, the sigh of the weary,
Hard Times, hard times, come again no more.
Many days you have lingered around my cabin door;
Oh! Hard times come again no more.

While we seek mirth and beauty and music light and gay,
There are frail forms fainting at the door;
Though their voices are silent, their pleading looks will say
Oh! Hard times come again no more.
Chorus

There's a pale weeping maiden who toils her life away,
With a worn heart whose better days are o'er:
Though her voice would be merry, 'tis sighing all the day,
Oh! Hard times come again no more.
Chorus

'Tis a sigh that is wafted across the troubled wave,
'Tis a wail that is heard upon the shore
'Tis a dirge that is murmured around the lowly grave
Oh! Hard times come again no more.
Chorus

== Recordings ==
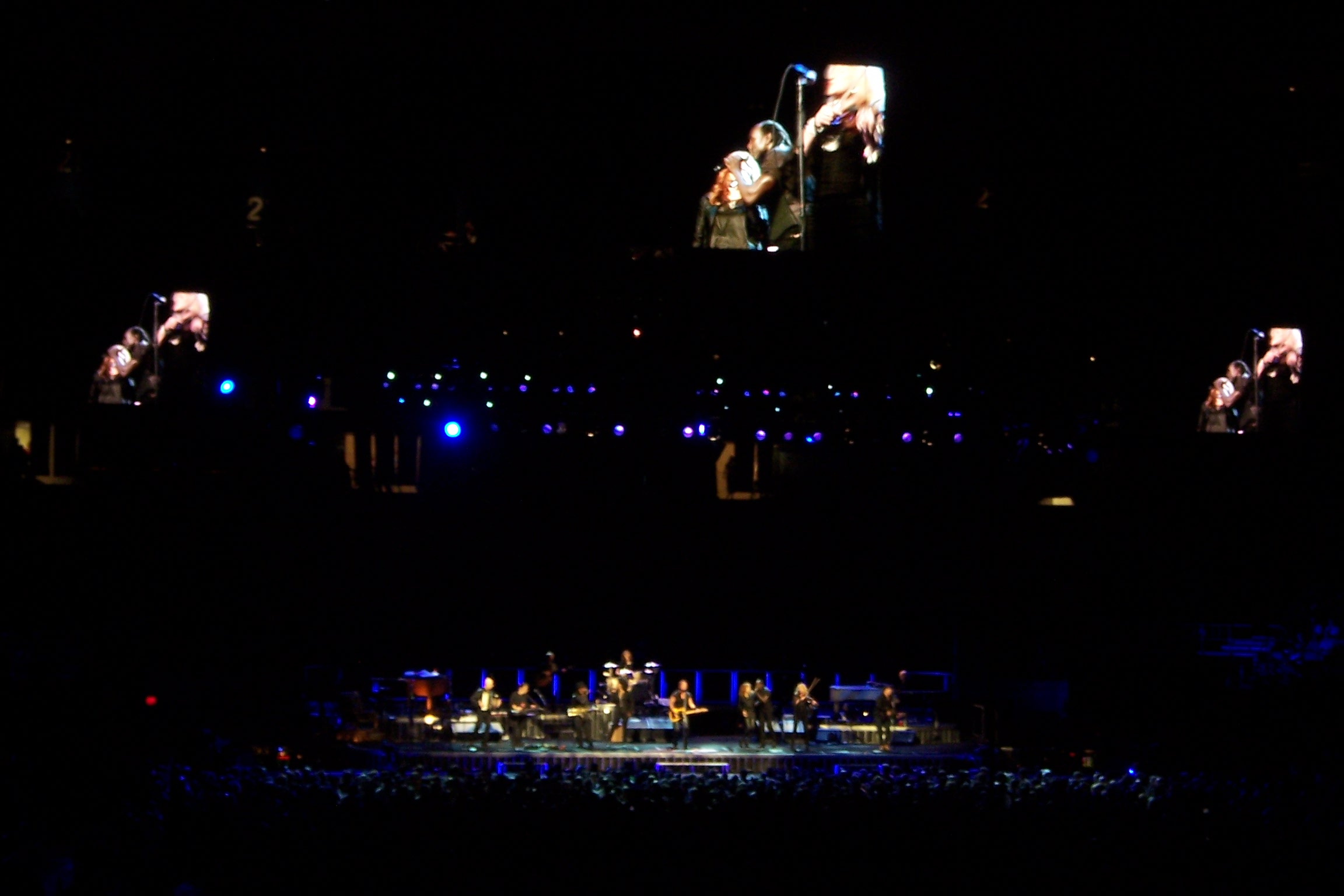
Bruce Springsteen and the E Street Band made "Hard Times" a focal piece of their 2009 Working on a Dream Tour.

"Hard Times Come Again No More" has been included in the following:

- Jennifer Warnes, from her 1979 album Shot Through The Heart.
- Dolly Parton opens her 1980 song "Hush-A-Bye Hard Times" with an a cappella verse from the song.
- The North Carolina band Red Clay Ramblers featured the song on their 1981 album Hard Times.
- Recorded by Irish singer Mary Black on her 1984 album Collected and 1997 album Various artists Gael Force.
- Akiko Yano sings this song on her 1989 album "Welcome Back".
- On Syd Straw's 1989 debut album Surprise, Straw and X frontman and solo artist John Doe recorded a version of the song.
- By Scottish group The Proclaimers on a 1989 BBC radio session.
- By Kate & Anna McGarrigle on the 1991 Songs of the Civil War collection.
- By Emmylou Harris in her 1992 live album At the Ryman.
- By Bob Dylan for his 1992 album Good as I Been to You.
- As the penultimate track on the 1992 debut album from The Lost Dogs, Scenic Routes.
- Harvey Reid plays his acoustic guitar on his 1994 album Chestnuts.
- In Series One (1995) of the "Transatlantic Sessions", the song was performed by an ensemble composed of Kate and Anna McGarrigle, Rufus Wainwright, Emmylou Harris, Mary Black, Karen Matheson and Rod Paterson.
- The 1995 movie Georgia, sung by Mare Winningham.
- The 1995 movie The Neon Bible performed by Thomas Hampson.
- The 2nd South Carolina String Band featured the song on their album 1997 album Southern Soldier.
- Nanci Griffith on her 1998 effort Other Voices Too (A Trip Back to Bountiful).
- Ambassadors of Harmony perform an acappella male chorus barbershop arrangement on their 2000 album Sing Sing Sing!
- The 2000 Appalachian Journey, for voice & piano with Edgar Meyer (bass), James Taylor (vocals) Mark O'Connor (violin or fiddle) and Yo-Yo Ma (cello).
- Eastmountainsouth (aka Peter Bradley Adams & Kat Maslich) recorded this song on their eponymous album in 2003.
- Johnny Cash on the Redemption Songs disc of the 2003 Unearthed box set of out-takes and alternate versions from his American Recordings series.
- Mavis Staples recorded it for the Grammy award-winning album Beautiful Dreamer (2004).
- Jim Glaser included it on his 2004 album Me and My Dream. He had previously sung an acapella version for a TV appearance on Nashville Now in 1985.
- Randy VanWarmer recorded this song on his 2005 album Randy VanWarmer Sings Stephen Foster.
- In 2005, the song was included in the soundtrack Cameron Crowe's Elizabethtown, performed by Eastmountainsouth.
- The 2005 film My Brother's War by Whitney Hamilton.
- Matthew Perryman Jones included it on his 2006 album Throwing Punches in the Dark.
- Andru Bemis recorded it on his 2006 album Rail to Reel.
- On The 97th Regimental String Band's album, Raise a Ruckus.
- Bruce Springsteen and the E Street Band's 2009 Working on a Dream Tour and captured on their 2010-released London Calling: Live in Hyde Park concert video, in the midst of the Great Recession.
- Mary J. Blige and The Roots at the 2010 Hope for Haiti Now: A Global Benefit for Earthquake Relief telethon.
- In the Season 2 finale of Parenthood by the same name, the song was contributed to the soundtrack by Brett Dennen.
- The 2012 Voice of Ages by The Chieftains, with Paolo Nutini.
- The 2012 Eesti Kullafond collection of Estonian folk-pop group Folkmill.
- An Iron & Wine performance featured in commercials promoting the 2012 Copper television series on BBC America.
- Black 47, on the 2014 album Last Call.
- Ian Siegal on his 2014 Album "Man & Guitar - Live at the Royal Albert Hall, 31 October 2013".
- The 2014 9/11 Memorial commemoration (bagpipes adaption).
- Kristin Chenoweth performed the song on her 2014 live album Coming Home.
- Katy Treharne sings it on the Tearfund with 'West End has Faith' 2015 album Speechless.
- Joel Plaskett's 2015 album The Park Avenue Sobriety Test.
- Annie Moses Band performed the song on their 2015 album American Rhapsody.
- Australian artists Paul Kelly and Charlie Owen included the song on their 2016 album Death's Dateless Night.
- Civilization VI uses the song as the leitmotif of the American civilization.
- Madeleine Peyroux sang it on her album Secular Hymns (2016).
- The Swingles sang it on their album Folklore (2017).
- Shuli Natan sang it in Hebrew.
- Dan Romer performed an acoustic version of the song that can be heard being sung by various NPCs across Hope County in the 2018 game Far Cry 5.
- Mavis Staples' version opens the second episode of Ken Burns' 2019 PBS documentary miniseries, Country Music.
- Bill Frisell recorded the song for his 2019 album Harmony. The song is performed by Petra Haden.
- Arlo Guthrie, Vanessa Bryan and Jim Wilson released a track of the song on July 31, 2020 (C) 2020 Rising Son Records & Jim Wilson.
- The Hillbilly Thomists sang it on their 2021 album Living for the Other Side
- The Longest Johns released a recording of the song in 2021 as the first single of their 2022 album Smoke & Oakum.
- Hailee Steinfeld performed on piano joined by Adrian Blake Enscoe in Dickinson season 3, episode 5.
- Andrea von Kampen sang the song in the movie “A Chance Encounter” (2022).
