= Andrea von Kampen =

American singer-songwriter

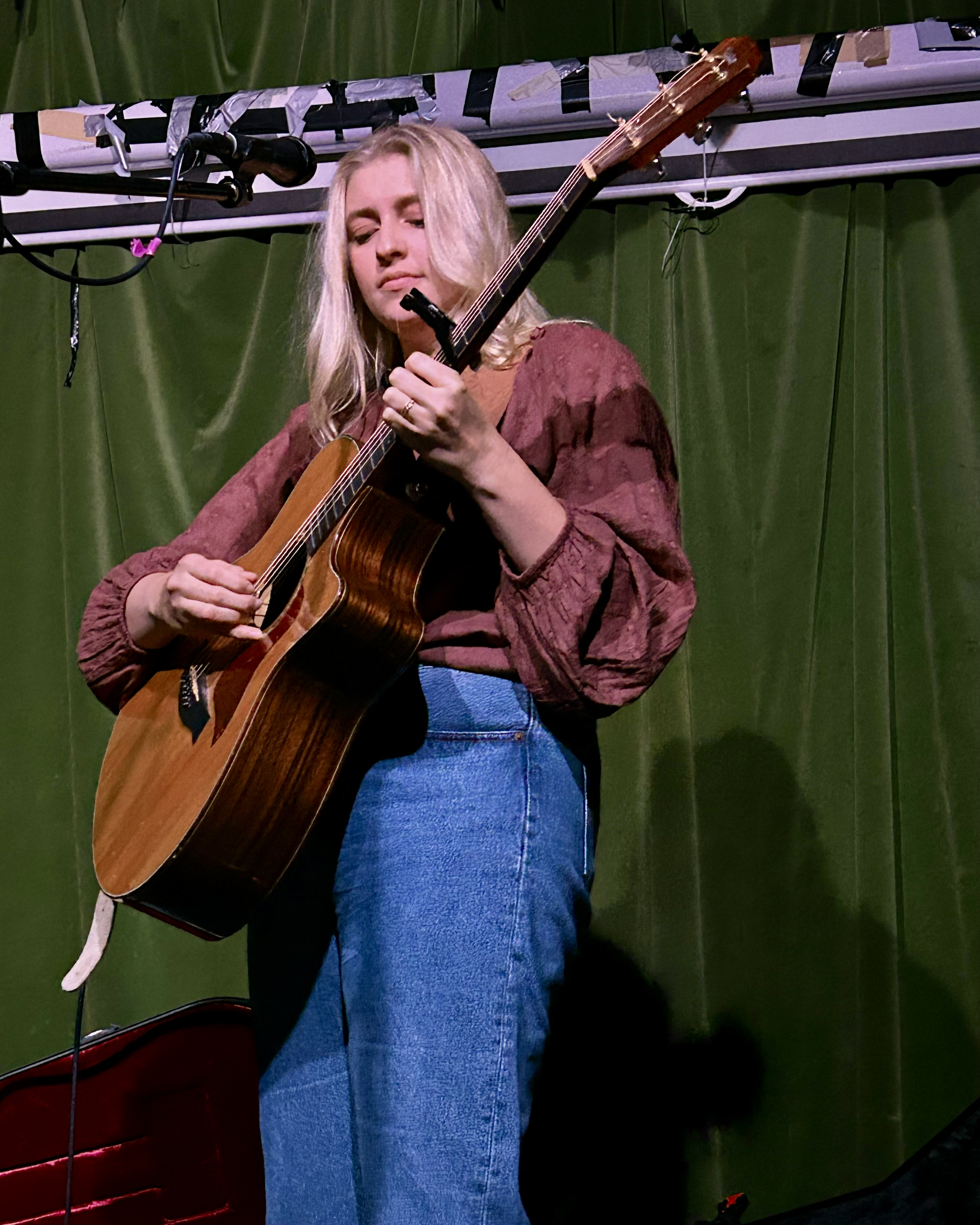
- Von Kampen performing at Gullivers in Manchester, England, 2026

Background information
- Born: October 3, 1994 (age 31); Ann Arbor, Michigan, U.S.
- Education: Concordia University Nebraska
- Genres: Folk
- Occupation: Singer-songwriter
- Instruments: Vocals; acoustic guitar
- Years active: 2015–present
- Label: Fantasy
- Website: andreavonkampen.com

Andrea von Kampen (born October 3, 1994) is an American folk singer-songwriter.

== Early life ==
Andrea von Kampen was born in Ann Arbor, Michigan, the daughter of Dory von Kampen, an English teacher, and Dr. Kurt von Kampen, a music professor and composer. She was raised in Ann Arbor and Seward, Nebraska. She grew up singing in church and school choirs. Von Kampen attended Seward High School, a public high school in the small town of Seward, Nebraska. She initially attended Belmont University in Nashville, Tennessee. She later transferred to Concordia University Nebraska, graduating in 2016 with a degree in music.

== Career ==
Von Kampen first gained national popularity with her submission to the 2016 Tiny Desk Contest of "Let Me Down Easy" which was retweeted by NPR Music. She finished the contest as a top ten finalist. Von Kampen again gained public note with her cover version of Alphaville's "Forever Young" for Hafod Hardware's 2019 Christmas advertisement video, a partnership that continued in other years. In 2021 von Kampen signed a recording contract with Fantasy Records. In addition to releasing her own music, Von Kampen has collaborated with her brother, composer David von Kampen.

== Discography ==
=== Albums ===
- Old Country (February 8, 2019)
- That Spell (August 6, 2021)
- A Chance Encounter (October 21, 2022)
- Sister Moon (March 15, 2024)

=== Extended plays ===
- Another Day (September 1, 2015)
- AVK Christmas Project (November 24, 2016)
- Desdemona (December 14, 2016)
- Andrea von Kampen on Audiotree Live (June 28, 2017)
- Romeo & Juliet (March 13, 2020)
- Portland (Acoustic) (March 30, 2023)
- August (July 27, 2023)
- Cedar Street (September 14, 2023)
- Sister Moon (October 19, 2023)
- Silent Night (November 2, 2023)
- Andrea Von Kampen | OurVinyl Sessions (June 3, 2024)

=== Singles ===
- "See It Through" (September 9, 2016)
- "Boots of Spanish Leather" (January 15, 2018)
- "Portland" (October 5, 2018)
- "Julia" (November 2, 2018)
- "Wildwood Flower" (January 11, 2019)
- "Crossing the Bar" (September 20, 2019)
- "Twilight & Evening Bell" (October 18, 2019)
- "Forever Young" (December 4, 2019)
- "Will You Still Love Me Tomorrow" (March 27, 2020)
- "Hard Times Come Again No More (From the Original Motion Picture Molto Bella)" (July 17, 2020)
- "Song for Mel" (October 2, 2020)
- "A Midwest Christmas" (November 6, 2020)
- "Take Back Thy Gift" (May 14, 2021)
- "Old Fashioned Holiday" (November 12, 2021)
- "Juniper" (June 23, 2023)
- "A Fox, a Bird" (January 18, 2024)
- "Such Love Does" (February 15, 2024)
- "Green Eyes" (August 9, 2024)
