= Hard Tack Come Again No More =

Song originating during American Civil War

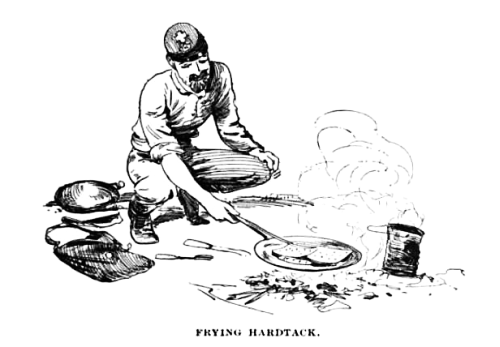
Civil War Soldier preparing hardtack—Illustration from Hardtack and Coffee, 1887.

"Hard Tack, Come Again No More" is an American Civil War-era parody of the song "Hard Times, Come Again No More." First called "Hard Crackers, Come Again No More!", it is a sarcastic complaint about the quality of some of the provisions provided by military contractors, specifically hardtack. The authors of the many verses of the parody are unknown, although the first version is often attributed to Josiah Fowler of the First Iowa Infantry dating to just after the Battle of Boonville, June 1861.

== Lyrics ==
Let us close our game of poker, take our tin cups in our hand
As we all stand by the cook's tent door
As dried mummies of hard crackers are handed to each man.
O, hard tack, come again no more!
CHORUS:
'Tis the song, the sigh of the hungry:
"Hard tack, hard tack, come again no more."
Many days have you lingered upon our stomachs sore.
O, hard tack, come again no more!

'Tis a hungry, thirsty soldier who wears his life away
In torn clothes—his better days are o'er.
And he's sighing now for whiskey in a voice as dry as hay,
"O, hard tack, come again no more!"
— CHORUS

'Tis the wail that is heard in camp both night and day,
'Tis the murmur that's mingled with each snore.
'Tis the sighing of the soul for spring chickens far away,
"O, hard tack, come again no more!"
— CHORUS

But to all these cries and murmurs, there comes a sudden hush
As frail forms are fainting by the door,
For they feed us now on horse feed that the cooks call mush!
O, hard tack, come again once more!

FINAL CHORUS
'Tis the dying wail of the starving:
"O, hard tack, hard tack, come again once more!"
You were old and very wormy, but we pass your failings o'er.
O, hard tack, come again once more!

Having to consume less appetizing food for extended periods led to revisions wishing for the return of hard tack.

== Bibliography ==
- Billings, John D. Hardtack and Coffee: Or, The Unwritten Story of Army Life. Boston: George M. Smith & Co. (1887).
- Ware, E.F. The Lyon Campaign in Missouri: Being a History of the First Iowa Infantry. Topeka, Kansas: Crane & Company (1907).
