= List of crackers =

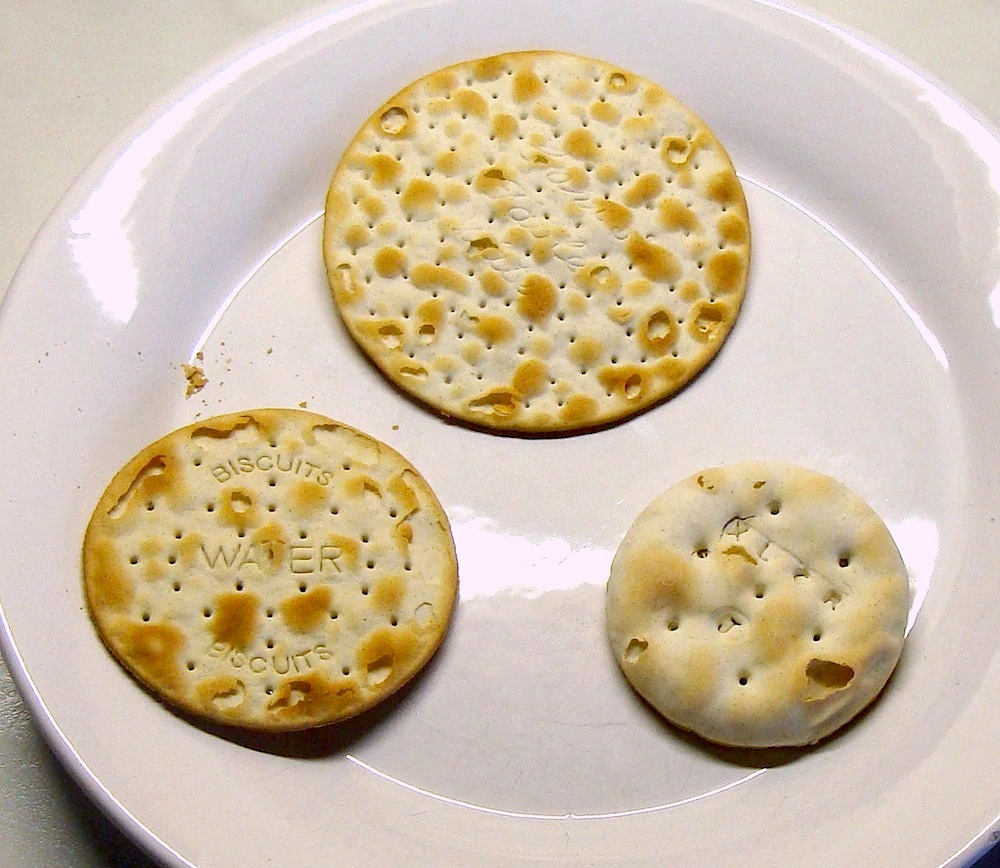
Water biscuits are baked using only flour and water, without shortening or other fats usually used in biscuit production. They are thin, hard and brittle, and usually served with cheese or wine.

This is a list of crackers. A cracker is a baked good typically made from a grain-and-flour dough and usually manufactured in large quantities. Crackers (roughly equivalent to savory biscuits in the United Kingdom and the Isle of Man) are usually flat, crisp, small in size (usually 75 millimetres (3.0 in) or less in diameter) and made in various shapes, commonly round or square.

== Crackers ==
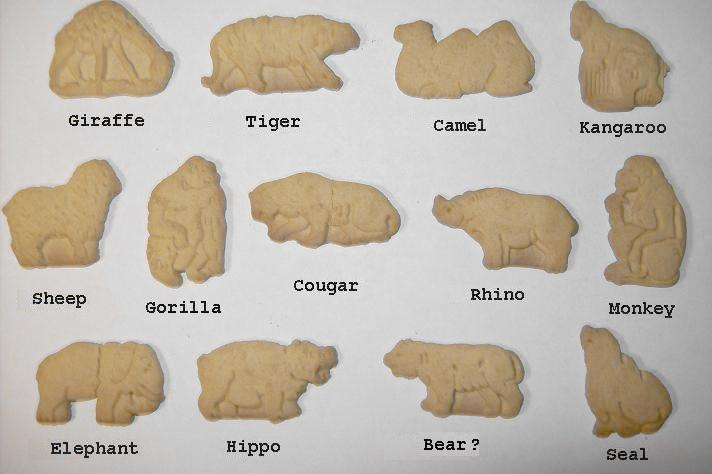
Animal crackers are a particular type of small cracker or cookie baked in the shape of an animal, usually an animal one might see at a zoo or circus, such as a lion, tiger, bear, or elephant.

- Animal cracker
- Bath Oliver
- Cream cracker
- Crispbread
- Cuban cracker
- Cheese cracker
- Graham cracker
- Hardtack
- Maltose crackers
- Matzo
- Mein gon
- Nantong Xiting Cracker
- Oatcake
- Olive no Hana
- Oyster cracker
- Pletzel
- Rice cracker
- Saltine cracker
- Taralli
- Water biscuit

=== Brand-name crackers ===
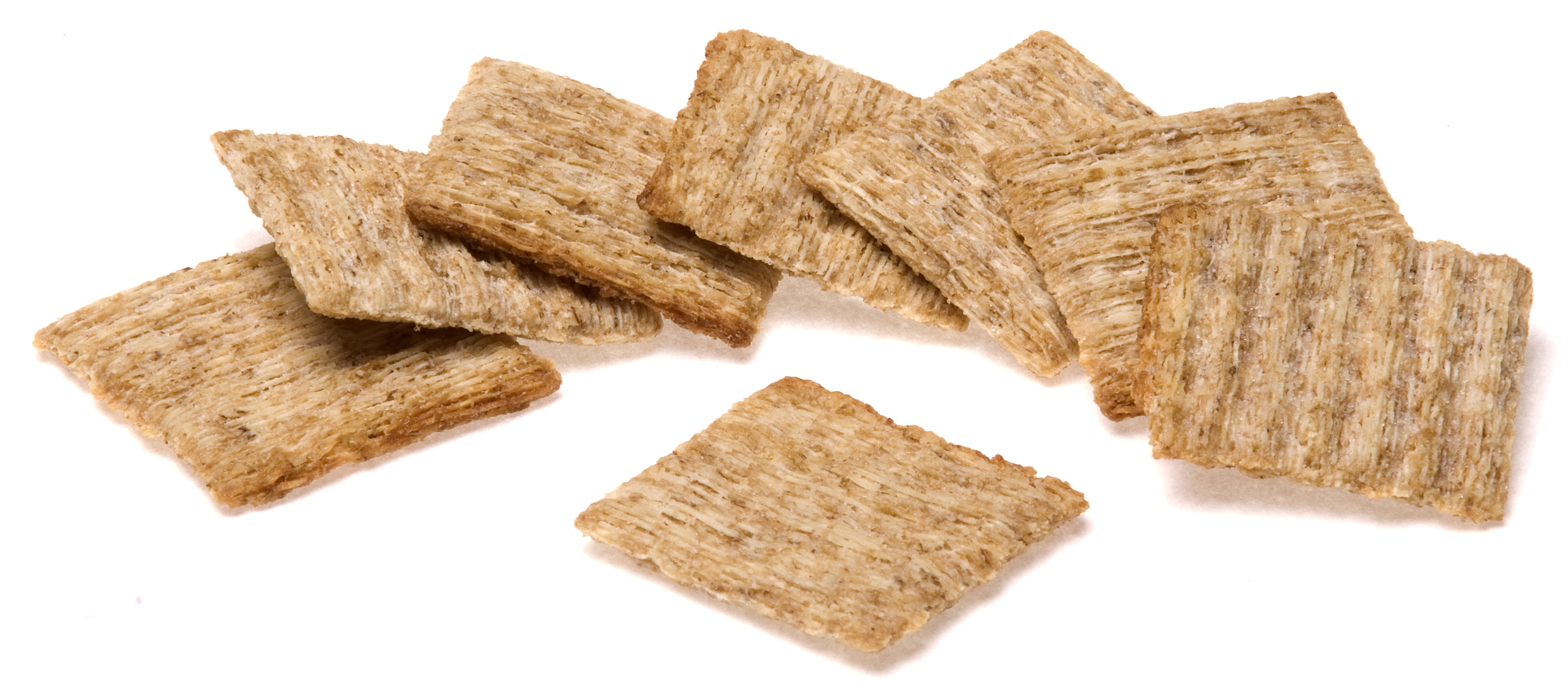
Triscuit crackers are baked whole wheat wafers.

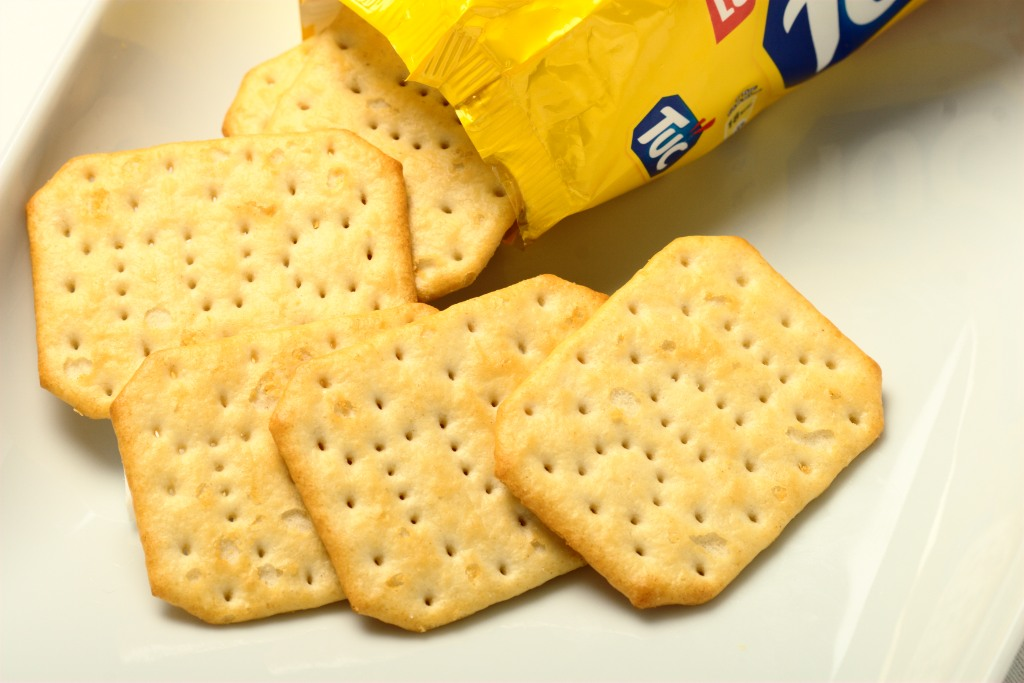
TUC crackers

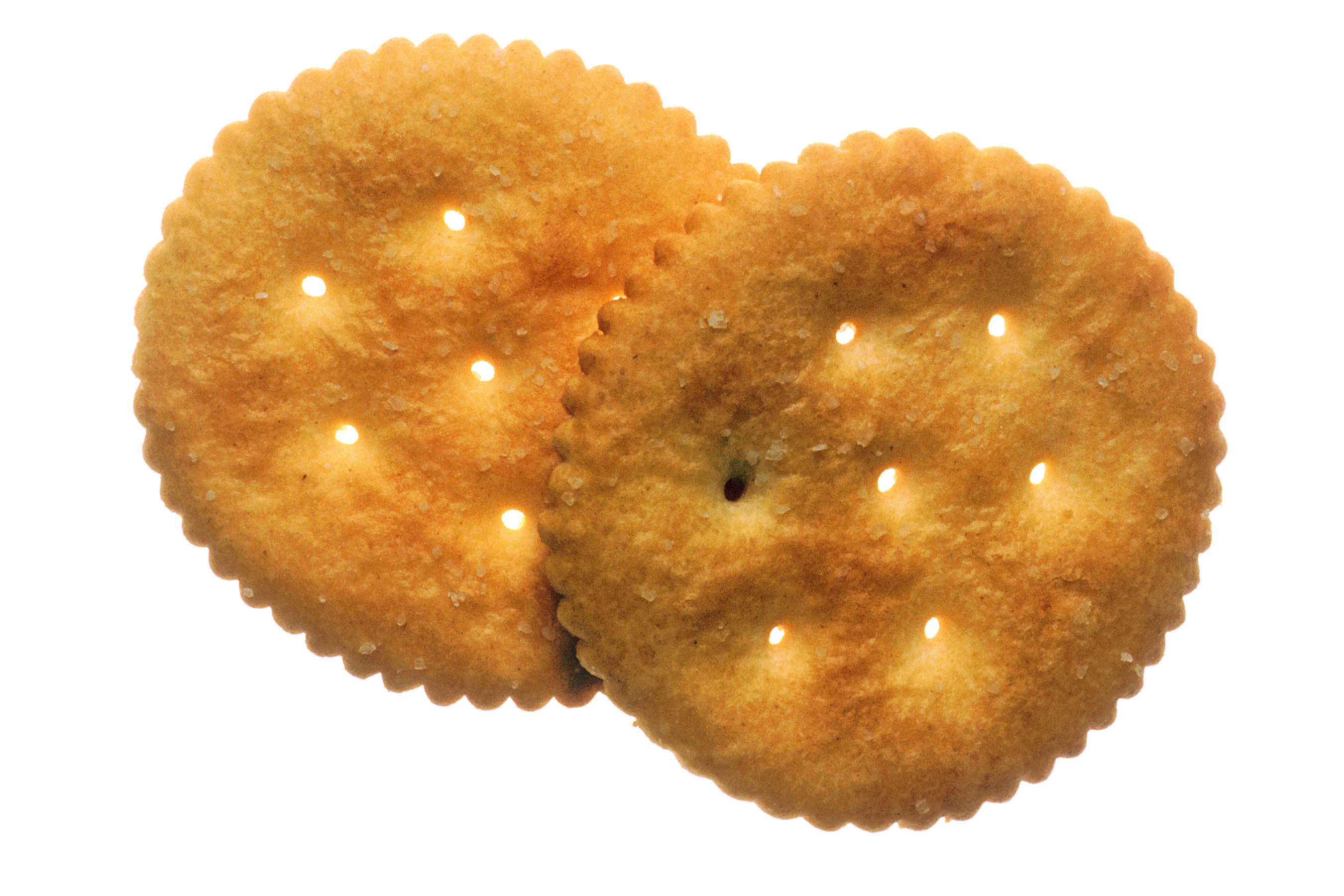
Ritz Crackers

- Airly
- Arnott's Shapes
- Better Cheddars
- Bremner Wafer
- Captain's Wafers
- Carr's
- Cheddars
- Cheese Nips
- Cheez-It
- Club Crackers
- Crown Pilot Crackers
- Goldfish
- In a Biskit
- Jacob's
- Pepperidge Farm
- Premium Plus
- Rebisco
- Rice Thins
- Ritz Crackers
- Ry-Krisp
- Ryvita
- SAO
- Triscuit
- TUC
- Vegetable Thins
- Wasabröd
- Westminster Cracker Company
- Wheat Thins

=== Rice crackers ===
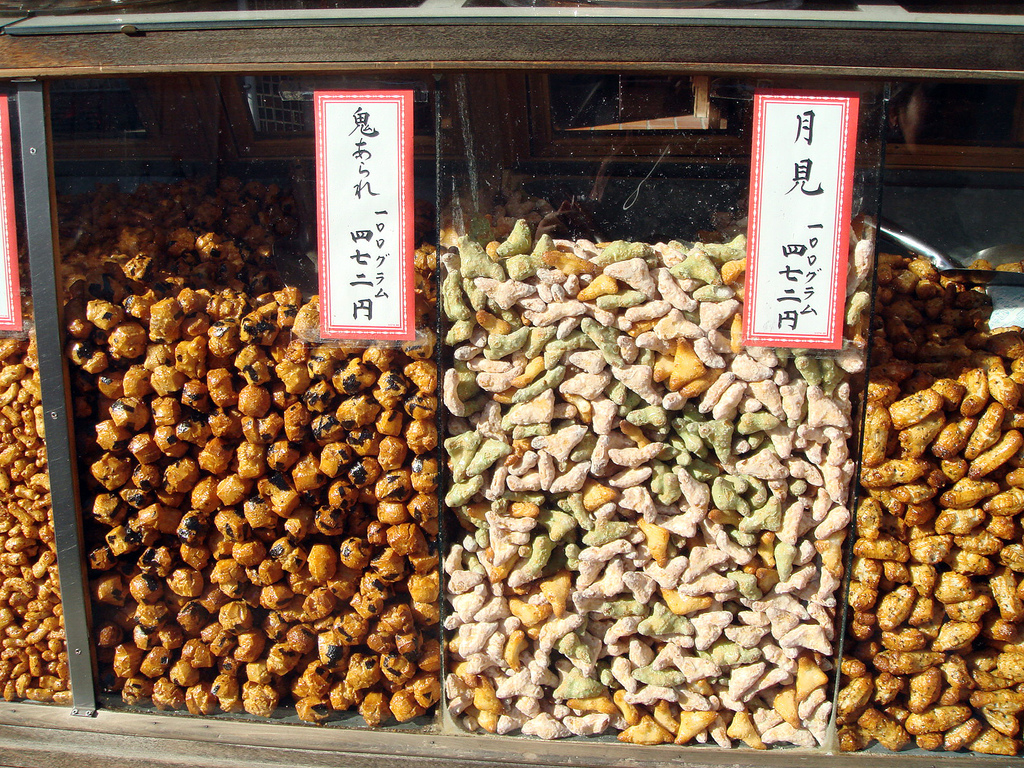
Arare is a type of bite-sized Japanese rice cracker made from glutinous rice and flavored with soy sauce.

- Rengginang
- Rice cracker
- Senbei

==== Beika ====
- Beika
- Arare
- Bakauke
- Kaki no tane
- Olive no Hana
- Senbei

== See also ==
- Cheese and crackers
- List of baked goods
- List of cookies
- List of breads
- Saltine cracker challenge
- Ritz Crackers
