= Adolphus W. Green =

American businessman (1843–1917)

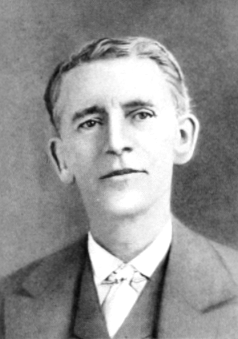
- Born: Adolphus Williamson Green; January 14, 1843; Boston, Massachusetts, U.S.
- Died: March 8, 1917 (aged 74); New York City, U.S.
- Education: Boston Latin School; Harvard University
- Occupations: Attorney, businessman
- Political party: Democratic Party
- Spouse: Esther Walsh
- Children: 1 son, 5 daughters

Adolphus Williamson Green (January 14, 1843 – March 8, 1917) was an American attorney and businessman. He was the co-founder of the National Biscuit Company (now known as Nabisco, owned by Mondelēz International) in 1898. A year later, in 1899, he was the first person to sell packaged biscuits. He served as the President of the National Biscuit Company from 1905 to 1917.

== Early life ==
Adolphus Williamson Green was born on January 14, 1843, in Boston, Massachusetts. His ancestors had immigrated to the United States from Ireland.

Green was educated in Boston public schools, including the Boston Latin School, from which he graduated in 1859. He entered Harvard University in 1859, graduating in 1863.

== Career ==
Green started as the principal of a high school in Groton, Massachusetts in 1864. In 1865, he became second assistant librarian at the New York Mercantile Library. From 1867 to 1869, he was promoted to full librarian. From 1869 to 1873, he worked for Evarts, Southmayd & Choate, a law firm co-founded by William M. Evarts, Charles Ferdinand Southmayd and Joseph Hodges Choate. He was admitted to the New York State Bar Association in 1873.

Green moved to Chicago, Illinois, in 1873, and began practicing as an attorney in Chicago. In 1886, he became the attorney of the South Park Commissioners. Later, he was the attorney of the Chicago Board of Trade.

Green was the co-founder of the American Biscuit and Manufacturing Company in 1890, by merging forty bakeries across the Midwest. He was also a co-founder of the United States Baking Company. By 1898, Green merged both companies with the Chicago-based New York Biscuit Company, which owned twenty-three bakeries from ten states on the East Coast. The merger of a hundred and fourteen bakeries led to the National Biscuit Company, co-founded by Green alongside Philip Danforth Armour, a meatpacking magnate, and Senator Frank Orren Lowden of Illinois.

Green first served as the general counsel of the National Biscuit Company, and later as the chairman of its board of directors. In 1899, he was the first person to sell packaged biscuits instead of selling them in bulk. Green went on to serve as the President of the National Biscuit Company from 1905 to 1917. Under his leadership, the company marketed Uneeda biscuits, animal crackers and Oreos. Green encouraged his employees to buy stocks, refused to hire children in his factories, and provided affordable meals. However, he was opposed to strikes and organized labor.

== Political activity ==
Green was a delegate to the 1892 Democratic National Convention. He supported Grover Cleveland in the 1892 United States presidential election.

== Personal life ==
Green married Esther Walsh, the daughter of Charles Walsh of Chicago, on June 3, 1879. Esther was a philanthropist, attending fundraisers for Barnard College, among other causes.

Six of their children survived to adulthood: a son, John Russell Green, and five daughters: Mrs Orville Browning Carrott (Jane), Mrs Bushrod Brush Howard (Esther Margaret), Mrs Norman Putnam Ream (Mary), Mrs Lucius Pond Ordway Jr. (Josephine), and Mrs Nelson S. Talbott (Elizabeth).

In Chicago, they resided at 4935 Greenwood Avenue. When they moved to New York City, they resided at the Plaza Hotel in Manhattan. They also maintained a country estate in Belle Haven, a neighborhood of Greenwich, Connecticut. They summered in Europe in 1897. They attended the inauguration ball for the re-election of President Theodore Roosevelt in 1905.

Esther predeceased him, dying on October 18, 1912, in Greenwich, Connecticut.

== Death and legacy ==
Green died on March 8, 1917. He was seventy-four years old. His funeral took place at St. Mary's Church in Greenwich, Connecticut on March 10, 1917. At the time of his death, he was worth US$2,400,000.

The National Biscuit Company, now known as Nabisco, is a subsidiary owned by Mondelēz International.

Green was referenced in the idle video game Cookie Clicker, one of the first and best known of the genre. In the game an achievement says:

"There's really no hard limit to how long these achievement names can be and to be quite honest I'm rather curious to see how far we can go. Adolphus W. Green (1844-1917) started as the Principal of the Groton School in 1864. By 1865, he became second assistant Librarian at the New York Mercantile Library; 1867 to 1869, he was promoted to full librarian. From 1860 to 1873, he worked for Evarts, Southmayd & Choate, a law firm co-founded by William M. Evarts, Charleş Ferdinand Southmayd Joseph Hodges Choate. He was admitted to the New York State Bar Association In 1873. Anyway, how's your day been?"
