= Chicken and Biscuits =

Chicken and Biscuits may refer to:

- Chicken & Biscuits, studio album by American country music singer/rapper Colt Ford
- Chicken & Biscuits (play), a 2021 Broadway play starring Norm Lewis and Michael Urie
- Bojangles' Famous Chicken 'n Biscuits, Southeastern United States regional chain of fast food restaurants, specializing in cajun seasoning, fried chicken, and buttermilk biscuits
- Popeyes Chicken and Biscuits, the former name of Popeyes, American multinational chain of fried chicken fast food restaurants
- Mrs. Winner's Chicken & Biscuits, Southeastern United States regional chain of fast food restaurants which specializes in fried chicken

== See also ==
- Chicken in a Biskit, chicken-flavored snack cracker
