= St. Mary Church (Greenwich, Connecticut) =

Coordinates: 41°01′40.2″N 73°37′35.9″W

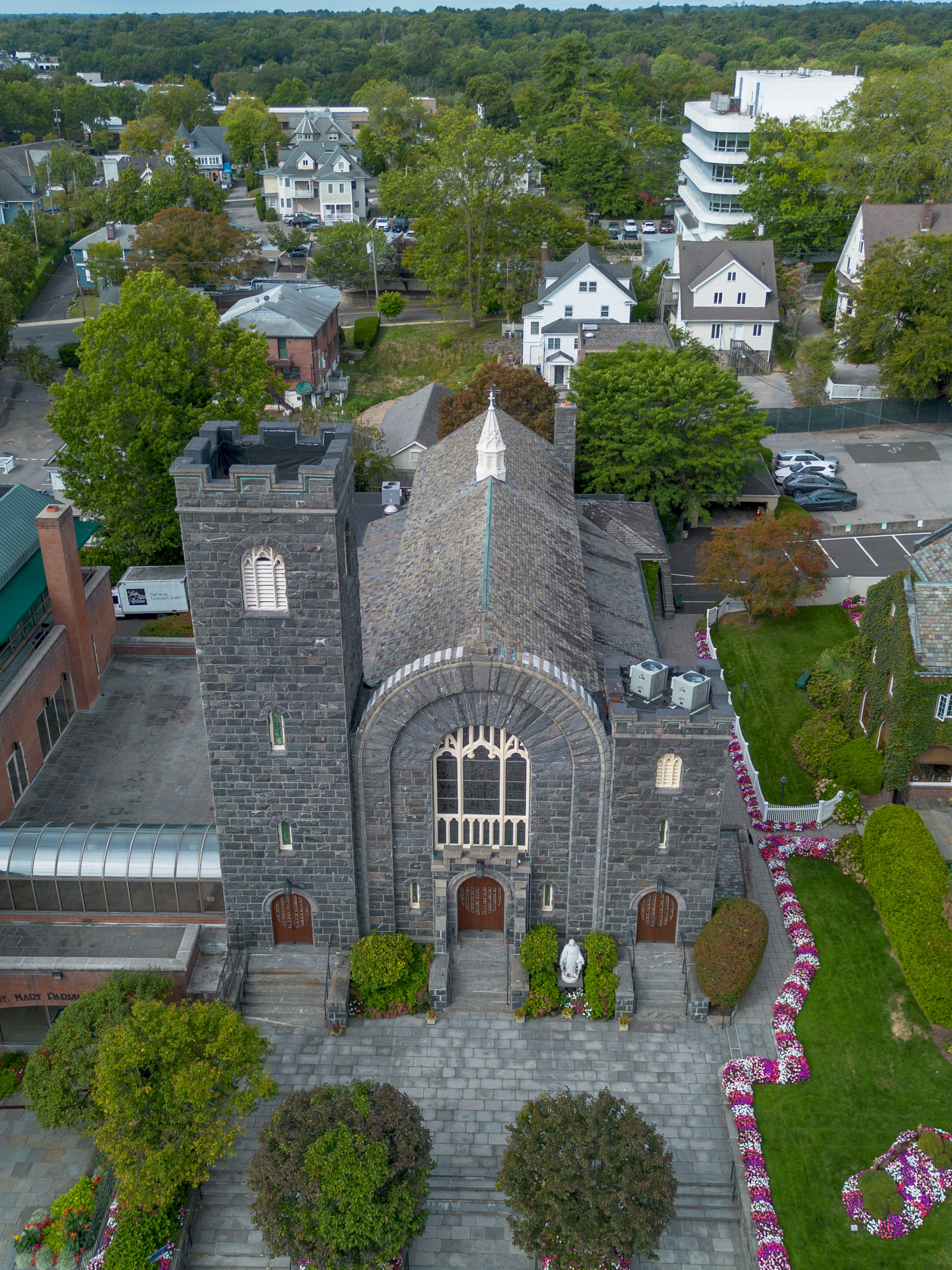
- St. Mary's Church in 2025
- St. Mary Church
- Location: 178 Greenwich Avenue; Greenwich, Connecticut
- Country: United States
- Denomination: Roman Catholic

Architecture
- Architect: Mr. Whiticker

Administration
- Province: Hartford
- Diocese: Bridgeport

Clergy
- Bishop: Most Rev. Frank Joseph Caggiano

St. Mary is a Roman Catholic church in Greenwich, Connecticut, United States, part of the Diocese of Bridgeport.

== History ==
Around 1854, Greenwich became a mission station of St. John's in Stamford. Visiting priests offered Mass in private homes or at the Town Hall. In 1860 a small church was erected on William Street. The parish was founded in 1874. In 1875 Rev. M.A. Tierney added a choir gallery to the church. He later purchased land for a new church from James Elphich. During the tenure of Rev. Denis J. Cremin, the cornerstone of St. Mary's Church was laid by Bishop Thomas Galberry of Hartford. The new white frame colonial church was dedicated on May 18, 1879.

Rev. Thomas Smith became pastor in September 1879. He converted the old church on William St. into a school, which was staffed by the Sisters of Mercy from Middletown. The church was decorated in 1884 and enlarged in 1888. on May 16, 1900, a disastrous fire destroyed the early church along with a number of other buildings in the area.

The funeral of Adolphus W. Green, the founder of Nabisco (including Oreo biscuits), was held in this church on March 10, 1917.

Msgr. Frank Wissel was appointed pastor of St. Mary's in 1997. On the occasion of his retirement in 2014, a marble statue of Our Lady of the Miraculous Medal, donated anonymously, was erected outside the churchmin honor of Wissel. He died a week later on June 19 at the age of seventy-six.

== Architecture ==
The current stone church was designed in 1900 by Henry C. Pelton. The parish complex also contains a school and convent. St. Mary Church and Rectory are included as significant contributing properties in the Greenwich Avenue Historical District, Greenwich, Connecticut.
