= Fred Rich =

Polish-American bandleader and composer (1898–1956)

Freddie Rich

Background information
- Birth name: Frederic Efrem Rich
- Born: January 31, 1898 Warsaw, Poland
- Origin: New York City, New York, U.S.
- Died: September 8, 1956 (aged 58) Beverly Hills, California, U.S.
- Genres: Jazz, swing, pop
- Occupation(s): Musician, bandleader, composer, music director
- Instrument: Piano
- Years active: 1920s–1950s
- Labels: Okeh, Columbia, Paramount, Camden, Vocalion

Frederic Efrem Rich (January 31, 1898 – September 8, 1956) was a Polish-born American bandleader and composer who was active from the 1920s to the 1950s. Among the musicians in his band were the Dorsey Brothers, Joe Venuti, Bunny Berigan, and Benny Goodman. In the early 1930s, Elmer Feldkamp was one of his vocalists.

== Early life ==
Rich was born in Warsaw, Poland. He settled with his parents in New York City and showed an early proficiency for music. He studied at the Damrosch Conservatory of Music and led an orchestra at the Hotel Astor.

== Career ==
Rich was a pianist and formed his band in the early-1920s. His theme songs were "I'm Always Chasing Rainbows" and "So Beats My Heart for You." Between 1925 and 1928, he toured Europe. He enjoyed a long stay at the Waldorf-Astoria in New York City. He began leading a studio band and recorded for Okeh, Columbia, Paramount, Camden, and Vocalion, often under the names Fred Richards, the Astorites, and the Hotel Astor Band. Rich and his band served as their house band for a time in the 1920s. In the late 1930s, he became musical director for radio stations. In 1942, he moved to a staff position with United Artists Studios in Hollywood, where he remained for most of his career.

Rich's band played for several network radio programs, including The Abbott and Costello Show.

Most of Rich's records are typical dance fare of the era. However, during the period between November 1929 and March 1931, there was a scattering of hot jazz versions of popular tunes, with notable solos by Bunny Berigan, Tommy Dorsey, Jimmy Dorsey, Joe Venuti, and Eddie Lang. These celebrated recordings include "A Peach of a Pair" (October 29, 1930), "I Got Rhythm" (October 29, 1930), "Cheerful Little Earful" (November 19, 1930), and "I'm Tickled Pink with a Blue-Eyed Baby" (November 19, 1930).

As Freddie Rich, he recorded dozens of popular-title piano rolls in the 1920s for the Aeolian Company, both for its reproducing Duo-Art system and its 88 note Mel-O-Dee label. Rich also contributed to the composition of a novelty song "I'm Just Wild About Animal Crackers". He has a number of song credits to his name, including "Blue Tahitian Moonlight," "Time Will Tell", and "On the Riviera." He also wrote scores for movies.

== Personal life ==
In 1945, Rich was badly injured when he suffered a fall, and as a result he suffered from partial paralysis. But despite this, Rich continued to lead studio bands into the 1950s. Fred Rich died on September 8, 1956, in California, at the age of 58 after a long illness.

== Nominations ==
- 1943 - Nominated for Academy Award for Original Music Score (Scoring of a Musical Picture) for Stage Door Canteen
- 1944 - Nominated for Academy Award for Original Music Score (Scoring of a Dramatic or Comedy Picture) for Jack London
