= Oyster cracker =

Small American cracker

Oyster crackers
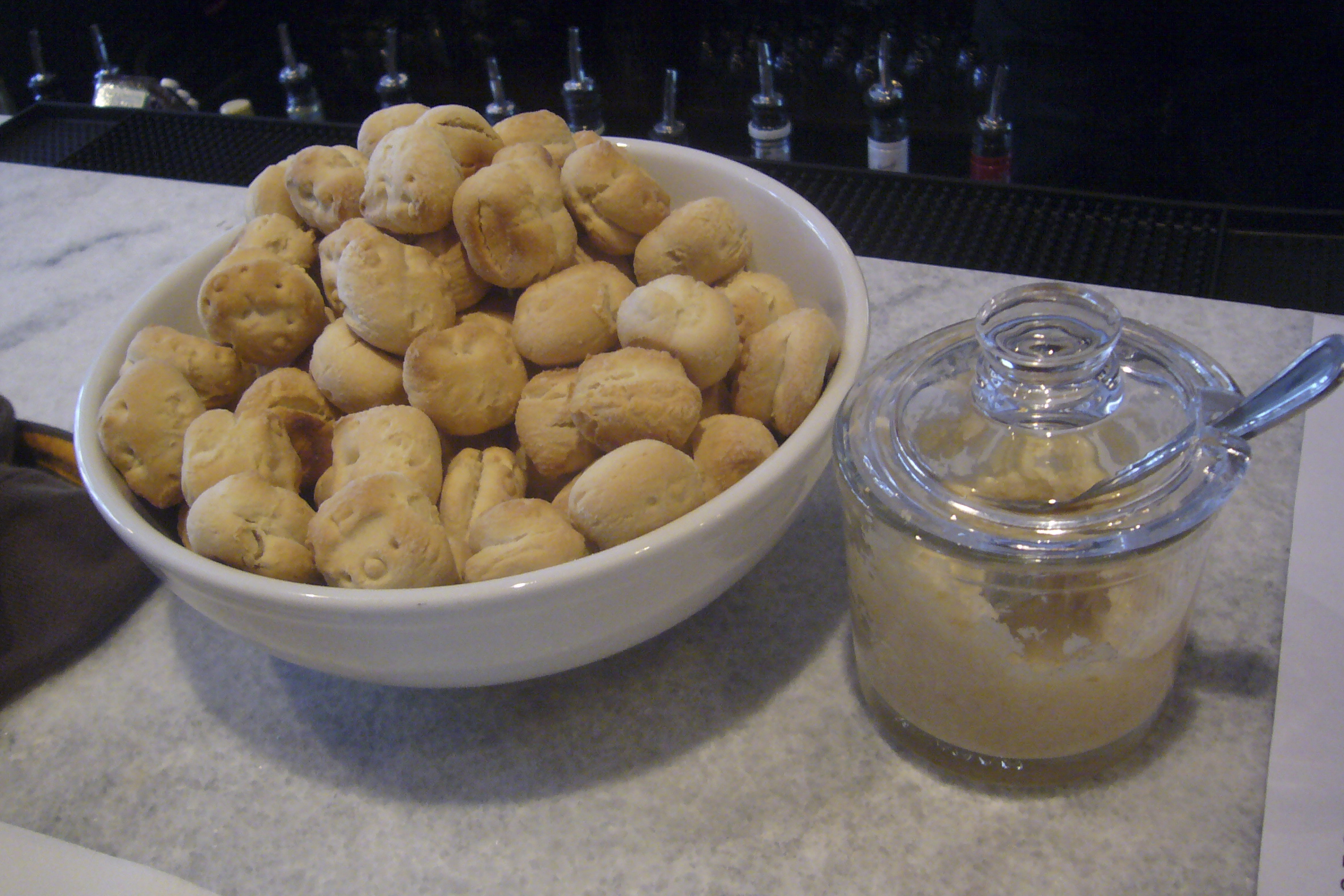
- A bowl of oyster crackers
- Alternative names: water cracker
- Type: Cracker
- Place of origin: United States
- Region or state: Northeast
- Created by: Westminster Cracker Company
- Main ingredients: Flour, shortening, leavening (baking powder), yeast, sugar, salt

Oyster crackers are small, salted crackers, typically rounds about 15 millimetres (5/8 inch) in diameter, although a slightly smaller hexagonal variety is also common. Oyster crackers are often served with oyster stew and clam chowder and have a flavor similar to saltine crackers.

== In cuisine ==
Oyster crackers are popular in the northeastern United States, where they are served as an accompaniment to soup, and in the Cincinnati area, where they are frequently served with that city's distinctive chili. In New England, oyster crackers are served with oyster stew and chowders. Plain oyster crackers are sometimes seasoned with various spices or pepper sauce and served as an appetizer or snack. Oyster crackers have a taste similar to saltine crackers, but usually are less salty. In other areas of the United States, they are among the choices for crackers with soup or salads and are often available in restaurants in single serving packages.

Many different companies produce oyster crackers with different combinations of shortenings and other ingredients, but retaining the same general shape and size.

== Etymology ==
The origin of the term oyster cracker is unclear, but it may be that they were originally served with oyster stew or clam chowder or possibly that they look somewhat like an oyster in its shell. Other names include water cracker, Philadelphia cracker, and Trenton cracker.

== Origins ==
The Westminster Cracker Company, currently of Rutland, Vermont, says it has been making oyster crackers since 1828. However, a counterclaim credits Adam Exton with inventing the oyster cracker nearly 18 years later.

Exton, a baker in Trenton, New Jersey, immigrated to America from Lancashire, England, in 1842. In Trenton, Exton opened a cake and cracker bakery with his brother-in-law, Richard Aspden, in 1846. Although Aspden died the following year, Exton continued with the bakery (the "Exton Cracker Bakery" or "Adam Exton & Co."). He invented a machine that rolled and docked pastry and solved the sanitary problems of hand-rolling crackers.

The history of the oyster cracker was related by Exton's nephew, also named Adam Exton, in the Trenton Evening Times newspaper on May 31, 1917:

Even a cracker has a history. The past, present and future of the little disc of baked dough with "Exton" stamped across the face of it was discussed by Rotarian Adam Exton, of the Exton Cracker Company, at the weekly meeting of Trenton Rotary Club held this afternoon at Hildebrecht's... Manufacture of the Exton oyster cracker was started in Trenton, in the same location now occupied by the company's factory of Center Street, in 1847. Adam Exton, uncle of the speaker, was the originator of the oyster cracker. At the outset the factory had an output of 100 pounds of crackers a day, 36 of them to a pound, making a daily capacity of 3,600 crackers. (For the record, oyster crackers of today are much smaller and a pound of oyster crackers runs between 350 and 400 crackers, depending on manufacturer.)

== See also ==
- Cuisine of Philadelphia
- List of crackers
- Saltine cracker
