= Club Crackers =

Type of cracker

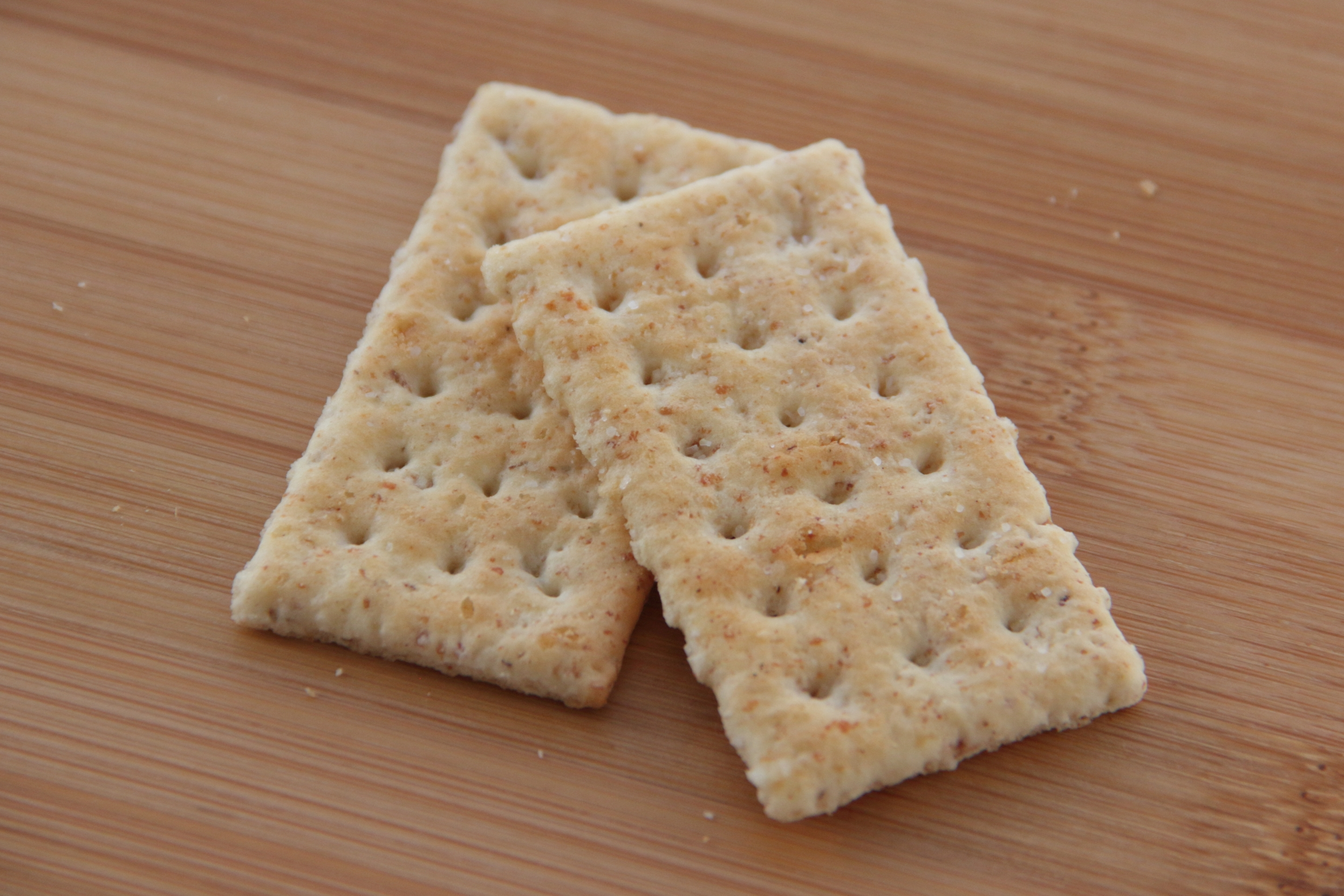
Two Club Crackers

Club Crackers are crackers made by the Kellogg Company. They are somewhat similar in resemblance to saltines, but are rectangular and have 18 holes in a 3x6 pattern instead of the 13 holes in a 3-2-3-2-3 pattern that are on a saltine. Also, their short edges are even, not perforated. A square variant used in Club & Cheddar sandwich crackers retains the saltine shape and hole pattern. They have a buttery flavor and a large amount of fat, 3g per serving, or 84g per 13.7 oz box not found in regular saltines. The crackers contain 70 calories per serving with four total crackers in one serving. Originally branded as a product of Keebler, it became a product of Kellogg's after the mega American manufacturer acquired the brand in 2001, before subsequently selling the Keebler cookie lineup as well as rights to the Keebler brand name in 2019.

== Nutrition ==
Club crackers are a "Light, Flaky, Buttery" snack. In the small snack stack package there are seventeen crackers. Each cracker has 17.5 calories. Thus, a whole snack pack contains 297.5 calories.

== See also ==
- List of crackers
