= I'm Just Wild About Animal Crackers =

"I'm Just Wild About Animal Crackers" is a 1926 novelty song by Fred Rich, Harry Link, and Sam Coslow. It was first recorded by Duke Ellington on June 21, 1926 and two days later by Irving Aaronson and his Commanders. Around the release of the song, A&P Stores and Henry Waterson Inc. arranged to sell a copy of the song and a box of animal crackers together for 25 cents.

== Notable recordings ==
- Mel Blanc and the Sportsmen with Billy May's Orchestra
- The Six Jumping Jacks
- Harry Reser and Seven Wild Men
- Irving Aaronson and his Commanders
- Duke Ellington and His Washingtonians
- The California Ramblers
