= Better Cheddars =

Snack food brand

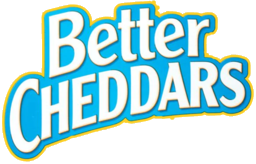
- Product type: Cheese crackers
- Current owner: Mondelez International
- Produced by: Nabisco
- Country: United States
- Introduced: February 1981; 45 years ago
- Previous owners: Nabisco
- Website: snackworks.com/bettercheddars

Better Cheddars is a brand of baked cheese crackers that are prepared using cheddar cheese as a main ingredient. Better Cheddars are manufactured by Nabisco, a subsidiary of Mondelēz International. In the United States, Better Cheddars are marketed under the "Flavor Originals" trademark, which also includes the Chicken in a Biskit brand. Better Cheddars were first introduced by Nabisco in February 1981. Various flavors of the cracker have been purveyed to consumers.

== History ==
Nutritional info
Nutritional value per 20 crackers
- Energy: 150 kcal (630 kJ)
- Carbohydrates: 18 g
- Dietary fiber: 1 g
- Fat: 8 g
- Saturated: 2 g
- Monounsaturated: 2 g
- Polyunsaturated: 4 g
- Protein: 3 g
Vitamins and minerals
Minerals	Quantity %DV^{†}
Potassium	1% 40 mg
Sodium	13% 290 mg
- Other constituents: Quantity
- Cholesterol: 5 mg
- ^{†}Percentages estimated using US recommendations for adults, except for potassium, which is estimated based on expert recommendation from the National Academies.

Better Cheddars were first introduced by Nabisco in February 1981, and originally had sourdough culture in its ingredients. They were advertised on television as the "San Francisco-style" snack cracker, and were the first commercials featuring actor/comedian Ron Carey as a cable car operator singing the Better Cheddars theme song and eating the snack. The name became a registered trademark in February 1985. The brand was created by Nabisco's Manhattan-based marketing agency of record, The William Esty Company, and the name was created by Senior Copywriter Niels Peter Olsen working with Creative Director Howard Cowell.

In 2018 and 2019, production of Better Cheddar crackers was disrupted following the recall of whey powder from Associated Milk Producers, Inc. (AMPI). Many other cheese flavored products were also affected, including Ritz crackers and Goldfish crackers. As of March, 2019, a shortage of Better Cheddars crackers remained as store shelves in some Midwest locations were bare.

== Varieties ==
Better Cheddars have been produced in original style, low salt and reduced fat varieties. Better Cheddars 'n onion is a former flavor that was introduced in 1987 and was discontinued soon afterwards. Bacon flavor was another discontinued variety.

== See also ==
- List of crackers
