= Nantong Xiting Cracker =

Chinese biscuit

- Type: Cracker
- Place of origin: China
- Main ingredients: Flour

Nantong Xiting Cracker (西亭脆饼 or 南通脆饼), also possibly known as sesame seed cake, is one of the specialties of Nantong. It is known for the quality of its ingredients and the meticulous preparation involved in its production.

== History ==
Nantong Xiting Cracker came to being during the Qing Dynasty when Guangxu Emperor was in power. By now it has about one hundred years of history. The pastry's birth is said to originate from a specific legend. Once upon a time during the aforementioned period in Xiting, a town in Nantong, a particular couple ran a pastry shop. The husband was called LengChunxi(冷纯溪). But in the town most farmers couldn't afford their products, so they made only a little money and lived on the edge of subsistence. Dissatisfied with this situation, the couple decided it was time for a change. They found most farmers liked eating crackers, so they decided crackers should become their main product. Day and night they devoted themselves to improving traditional crackers to cater to farmers. Finally they achieved success, coming up with the exceptional but still inexpensive cracker. The husband named it "Xiting White Cracker".

Xiting Cracker at first only spread around the local town. Its nationwide popularity is said to owe to the figure Zhang Jian. His ancestral residence was in Xiting and every year he went back to worship his ancestors. He was fond of the cracker, so he also presented them to far-off officials, native dealers as well as foreigner businessmen. Meanwhile, LengChunxi improved the cracker further and changed its name to "Xiting Cracker". Since then Xiting Cracker became popular not only among the middle class but also among the imperial family—even spreading abroad.

== Preparation ==
The preparation includes 28 steps. Fine white flour is used as the main material. The cracker is shaped by hand, then it is roasted with light fire so its surface becomes a little yellow but not burnt. It has about eighteen layers.

There are two ways of eating the cracker. One is eating it directly, and the other is dipping it into water first. In the direct manner one can taste its crispness and sweetness, but the water-dipping is better suited for the elderly to protect their stomachs.

== See also ==
- List of crackers
