= Animal cracker =

Cracker baked in the shape of an animal

Animal Cracker
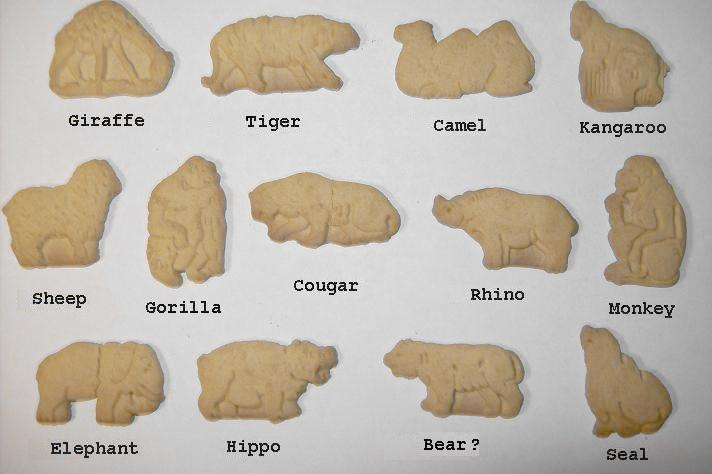
- Some of Barnum's animals
- Type: Biscuit/cookie
- Place of origin: England
- Invented: 19th century

An animal cracker is a particular type of cracker or biscuit – cookie in American English – baked in the shape of an animal, usually an animal either at a zoo or a circus, such as a lion, tiger, bear or elephant. The most common variety is light-colored and slightly sweet, but darker chocolate-flavored and colorful frosted varieties are also sold. Although animal crackers tend to be sweet in flavor like cookies, they are made with a layered dough, like crackers.

== History ==
In the late 19th century, animal-shaped crackers called "Animals" were imported from England to the United States. The demand for these crackers grew to the point that bakers began to produce them domestically. Stauffer's Biscuit Company produced their first batch of animal crackers in York, Pennsylvania, in 1871. Other domestic bakeries, including the Dozier-Weyl Cracker Company of St. Louis and the Holmes and Coutts Company of New York City, were the predecessors of the National Biscuit Company, today's "Nabisco Brands".

Animal biscuit crackers were made and distributed under the National Biscuit Company banner. In 1902, animal crackers officially became known as "Barnum's Animals" and evoked the familiar circus theme of the Barnum and Bailey Circus. Later in 1902, the box was designed for the Christmas season with the innovative idea of attaching a string to hang from the Christmas tree. Until that time, crackers were generally sold only in bulk (the proverbial "cracker barrel") or in large tins. These small cartons, which retailed for 5 cents at the time of their release, were a big hit and are still sold today.

The number and variety contained in each box has varied over the years. In total, 53 different animals have been represented by animal crackers since 1902. In its current incarnation, each package contains 22 cookies consisting of a variety of animals. The most recent addition, the koala, was added in September 2002 after being chosen by consumer votes, beating out the penguin, walrus and cobra.

In 1948, the company changed the product name to its current designation of "Barnum's Animals Crackers". In 1958, production methods changed to improve the cookies' visual details. Until then, animal shapes were stamped out of a dough sheet by a cutter. This produced outlines with little sophistication. By installing rotary dies, bakers can actually engrave details onto each cookie, creating a more intricate design. The rotary dies are still used today.

Barnum's Animals Crackers are produced in a bakery at Fair Lawn, New Jersey, by Nabisco Brands. More than 40 million packages of Barnum's Animals Crackers are sold each year, both in the United States and exported to 17 countries worldwide. The cookies are baked in a 300-foot-long (91 m) traveling band oven. They are in the oven for about four minutes and are baked at the rate of 12,000 per minute. About 15,000 cartons and 330,000 cookies are produced in a single shift, using some 30 miles (48 km) of string on the packages. Those bright circus boxes are produced in three colors—red, blue and yellow—with different variety of animals on each.

In August 2018, Mondelez International (the holding company of Nabisco) released a new design for its Barnum's Animals Crackers boxes in the United States, showing the animals freed from their traditional circus boxcar cages. This design change was made in consultation with People for the Ethical Treatment of Animals (PETA), one year after the Ringling Brothers and Barnum and Bailey Circus ceased operations. The new design shows a zebra, lion, elephant, giraffe and gorilla together in an African landscape.

== Varieties ==
In total, 53 different animals have been featured in Barnum's Animals Crackers since 1902. The current cookies are bear, bison, camel, cougar, elephant, giraffe, gorilla, hippopotamus, hyena, kangaroo, koala, lion, monkey, rhinoceros, seal, sheep, tiger and zebra. To celebrate its 100th anniversary, Barnum's added the koala to the menagerie in September 2002.

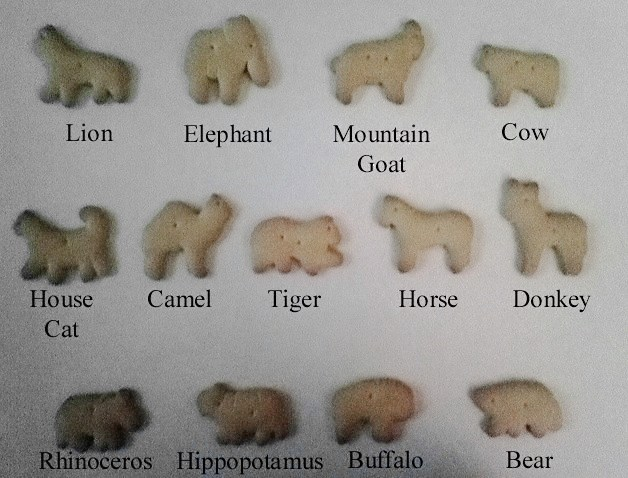
Stauffer's Animals Crackers

Stauffer's animal crackers include bear, bison, camel, cow, cat, donkey, elephant, hippopotamus, horse, lion, mountain goat, rhinoceros and tiger. They are produced in plain (vanilla), chocolate graham, cinnamon graham, "cotton candy" and icing-covered variants, as well as "breakfast cookies" made with oats, almonds, cranberries and pomegranate.

Austin Zoo Animal Crackers currently feature bear, camel, elephant, lion, monkey, owl, penguin, rabbit, ram, rhino, turtle and zebra.

Cadbury's Animals are chocolate coated and feature crocodile, elephant, hippo, monkey, lion, tiger and toucan.

== Manufacturers ==
Nabisco makes Barnum's Animals Crackers, with their distinctive package art of a circus wagon fitted out as a cage and animals inside of it. "Barnum" refers to the famous showman and circus entrepreneur P. T. Barnum, but Nabisco does not pay a licensing fee to Barnum and Bailey Circus. The product actually says "Barnum's Animals", subtitled "Crackers". Half of the wheels are printed on the large sides of the box but at one time the printed wheels continued to the bottom of the box, and were partially perforated along their outline, which allowed punching the wheels out and standing the wagon to stand on its wheels. Responding to requests from PETA, in August 2018 Nabisco released new package art displaying the animals roaming free.

Stauffer Biscuit Company of York, Pennsylvania, a Japanese company owned by Meiji, also has a line of animal crackers, which are distributed by several major discount retailers. Their use of the spices nutmeg and mace give the basic animal cracker a somewhat different taste from the Nabisco crackers. Former owner Rodney Stauffer now has his own company, Rodney's Animal Crackers, that also produces animal crackers.

Austin, a division of the Keebler Company, also makes a variety of animal crackers. The Austin variety has similar nutritional content and animal shapes. The Austin product is sold under the name of the Kellogg Company, which acquired Keebler in 2001.

Mother's Cookies, founded in Oakland, CA in 1914, has sold varieties of animal crackers that they market as "Circus Animal Cookies", frosted in pink and white, in the shapes of camels, hippos and lions, among others. Mother's Original Circus Animal Cookies are sprinkled with rainbow nonpareils and a variety of special runs themed for holidays are released annually, such as black cats on Halloween.

Until the late 1970s, the Borden corporation also produced a brand of animal crackers, which came in a red box featuring the Elsie the Cow logo.

Market Square Food Company Inc. in Illinois has also produced its own brand of animal crackers since 1982. Its animal crackers are distributed by several major retailers throughout the United States and internationally.

Sam's Club distributes animal crackers under its "Member's Mark" house brand.

In the United Kingdom, Cadburys produce a range with a chocolate coating on one side, called "Animals".

In Germany, Bahlsen produces animal crackers under the Leibniz brand.

In New Zealand, Arnott's manufactures "Iced Animals", colourfully iced animal crackers.

== In popular culture ==
- "I'm Just Wild About Animal Crackers" was recorded by Duke Ellington on June 21, 1926 and by Irving Aaronson & His Commanders with Phil Saxe doing the vocal for Victor on June 23, 1926.
- Animal Crackers is the name of a 1930 Marx Brothers film.
- A song sung by Shirley Temple in 1935, "Animal Crackers in My Soup", was used by many companies for advertising animal crackers.
- Animal crackers are the subject of Melanie Safka's 1968 novelty hit song "Animal Crackers".
- They are the namesake of Eric Whitacre's popular choral piece Animal Crackers (2002–2009).
- In the 2007 film Zodiac, Inspector Dave Toschi (portrayed by Mark Ruffalo) is frequently seen snacking on animal crackers. The real life Toschi was known for this habit as well.
- Animal Crackers is also the name of a 2017 animated film, which revolves around magical animal crackers that turn people into the animal each cracker is shaped like.

== See also ==
- List of crackers
- Teddy Grahams
- Goldfish
- Hello Panda
- Koala's March
- Crispy Critters
