= In a Biskit =

Brand of crackers

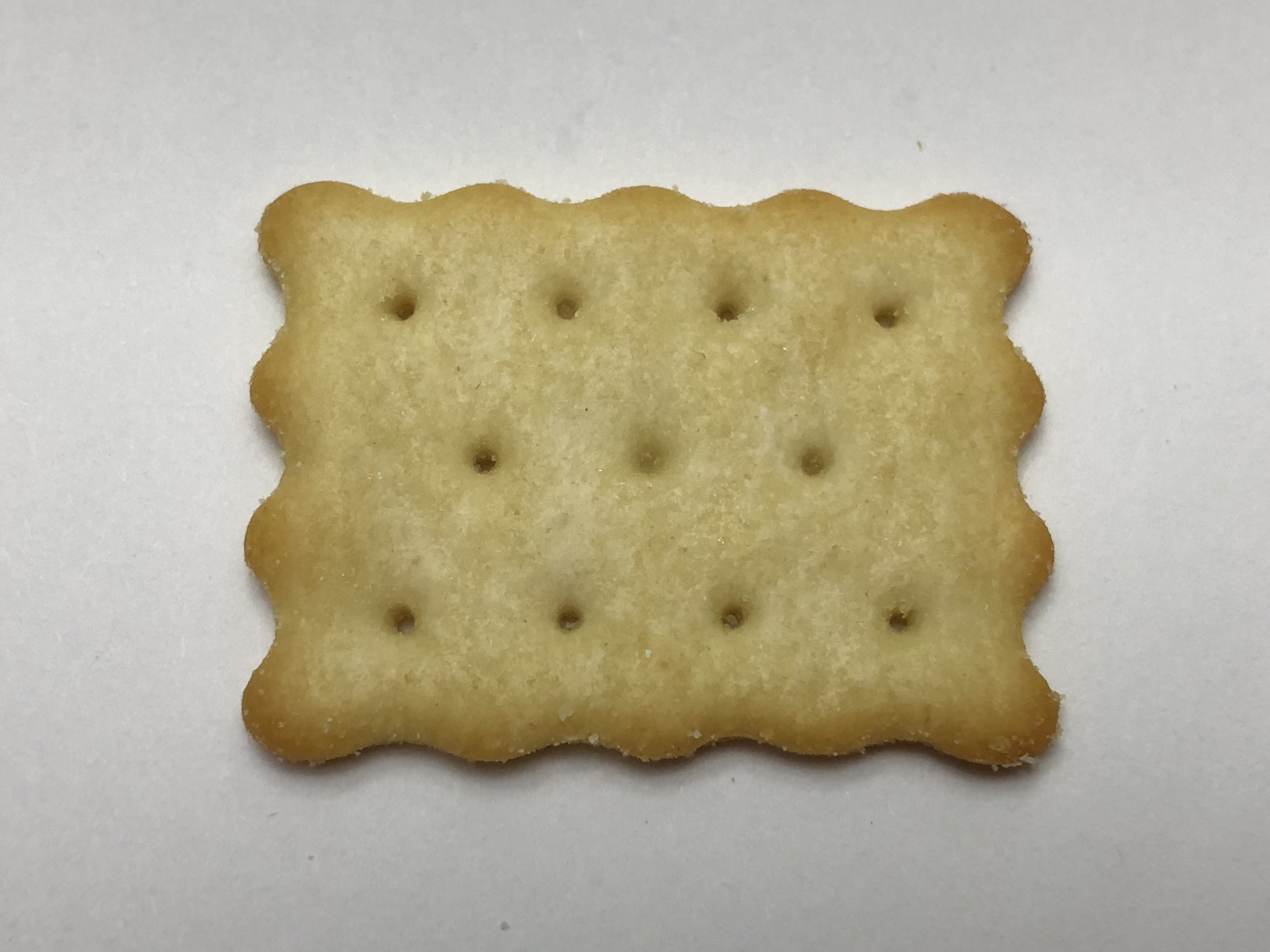
- Product type: Cracker
- Current owner: Mondelez International
- Introduced: 1964; 62 years ago
- Previous owners: Nabisco
- Website: snackworks.com/in-a-biskit

In a Biskit is a line of snack crackers produced by Nabisco. Originally released in the United States as Chicken in a Biskit in early 1964, the line has since grown to be available internationally with a variety of flavours.

== United States version ==
In the U.S., the product is flavored with dehydrated cooked chicken, but international formulations differ.

In the United States, the Chicken in a Biskit and Swiss in a Biskit variants were part of a line of crackers known as Flavor Originals' that included Better Cheddars'Sociables and Vegetable Thins. Chicken in a Biskit was originally available in original and barbecue flavours, and is now available in original and ranch.

== Australian version ==
In Australia, Nabisco also produced Vegemite, bacon and nacho flavoured "biskits", as well as more traditional flavours such as barbecue, crispy potato and salt and vinegar. In a Biskit crackers were packaged in a 175–200 gram box or a "Multi-pack" containing 10 bags of 25 grams each. Multi-packs were used in several Nabisco products and were introduced as part of the In a Biskit line in August 1999. The line was made at Kraft's Broadmeadows factory until its closure in 2006. Manufacturing was moved to China. While Australian Kraft Chicken in a Biskit listed chicken meat among the ingredients, an independent chemistry assay detected "no protein from any meat species" in the product.

Production of the In a Biskit range was discontinued in March 2015. In a Biskit returned to Australian shelves in August 2021 with Chicken and Drumstix flavours, with claims it is "oven baked in Oz" again. In August 2022, Mondelez announced it would release three new flavours inspired by Australian home delivery — Smoky Meatlovers, Cheese Burger and Loaded Cheese. In 2025 it later released "inspired by Philadelphia Sweet Chilli" and "Peri Peri Drumstix" flavours.

== See also ==
- List of crackers
