= Wheat Thins =

Snack food

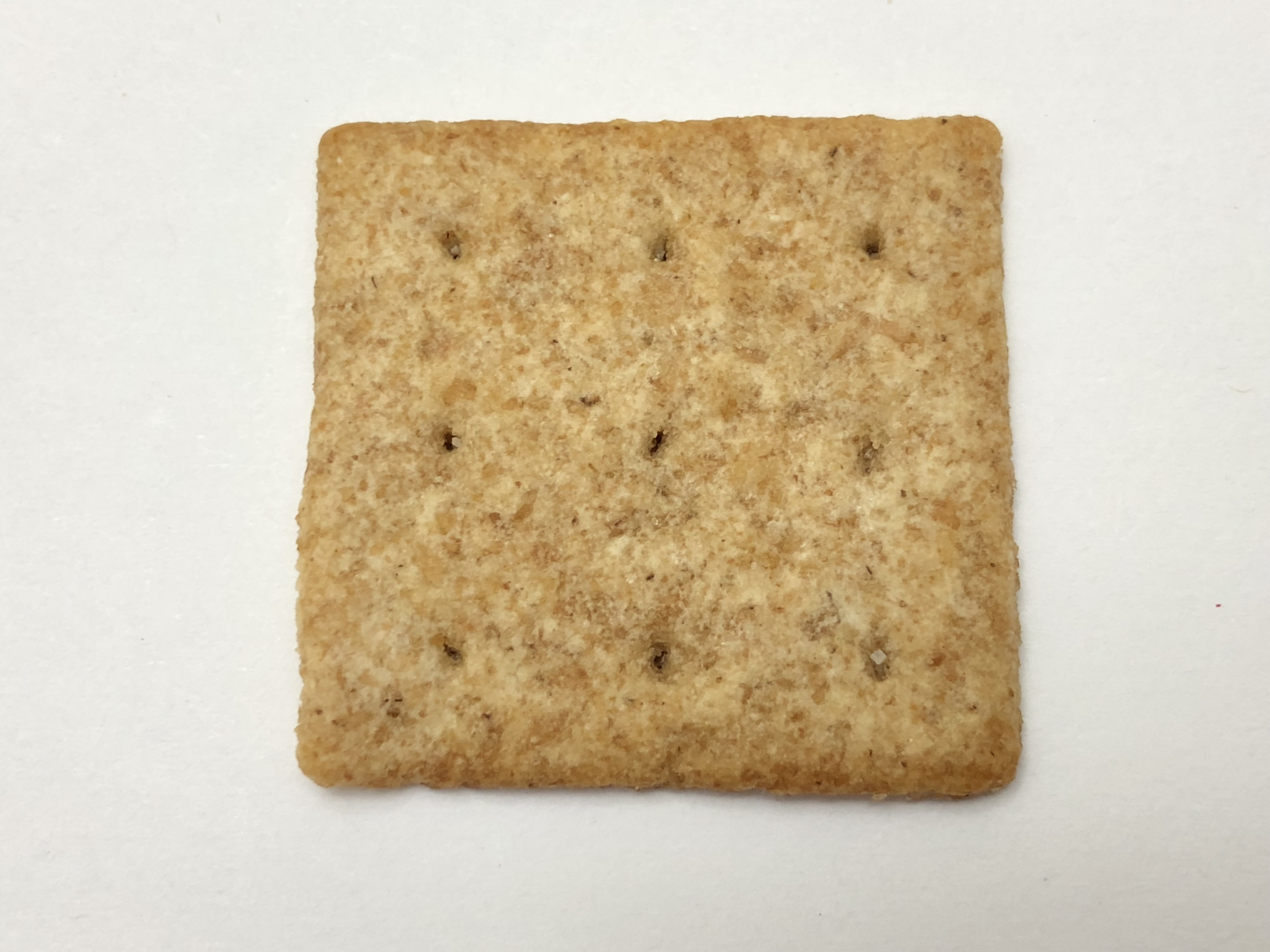
- Product type: Cracker
- Current owner: Mondelez International
- Introduced: 1947; 79 years ago
- Previous owners: Nabisco
- Website: wheatthins.com

Wheat Thins are a brand of baked whole grain snack food crackers distributed in the United States and Canada by Mondelez International. Vegetable Thins, Oat Thins, Pita Thins, and Rice Thins, which are all spinoffs of Wheat Thins, are available in Canada and some regions of the United States. Wheat Thins themselves come in many flavors and varieties. Nabisco first introduced the product in 1947.

== Varieties ==
There are several varieties available, depending on country and market:

- Artisan cheese: Wisconsin Colby
- Artisan cheese: Vermont White Cheddar
- Big
- Chipotle
- Spicy Sweet Chili
- Dill Pickle
- Fiber Selects 5-Grain
- Flatbread Garlic & Parsley
- Flatbread Tuscan Herb
- Hint of Salt
- Honey Mustard
- Lime (limited time 2013)
- Multigrain
- Original
- Popped – a popped chip variety of Wheat Thins
- Ranch
- Reduced Fat
- Sour Cream and Onion
- Smoked Gouda
- Smoky BBQ
- Spicy Buffalo
- Sundried Tomato & Basil
- Sweet Onion
- Sweet Potato
- Zesty Salsa

Additional discontinued/changed flavors:

- Baked Snack Reduced Fat
- Cream Cheese & Chives
- Harvest 5-Grain
- Harvest 7-Grain
- Harvest Garden Vegetable
- Honey
- Lightly Cinnamon
- Low Sodium
- Parmesan Basil

== See also ==
- Mondelēz International
- Kraft Foods
