= Nabisco =

American cookies manufacturer

- Formerly: National Biscuit Company (1898–1971); Nabisco (1971–1985); RJR Nabisco (1985–1999)
- Type: Subsidiary
- Industry: Food
- Predecessor: List: New York Biscuit Company; Kennedy Biscuit Company; Pearson & Sons Bakery; Josiah Bent Bakery; American Biscuit and Manufacturing Company; Richmond Steam Bakery
- Founded: June 19, 1898; 128 years ago in Chicago, Illinois
- Founders: William H. Moore; Adolphus Green; John G. Zeller
- Headquarters: East Hanover Township, New Jersey (Note: In fact, it is the headquarters of Mondelez North America), United States
- Products: Cookies, crackers, candy, chocolate
- Brands: List: Belvita; Better Cheddars; Cheese Nips; Chips Ahoy!; Fig Newtons; In A Biskit; Lorna Doone; Nilla; Oreo; Premium; Rice Thins; Ritz Crackers; Shredded Wheat; Teddy Grahams; Triscuit; Wheat Thins; Zu Zu Ginger Snaps
- Parent: Kraft Foods Inc. (2000–2012); Mondelēz International (2012–present)
- Website: www.nabisco.com

Nabisco (/nəˈbɪskoʊ/, abbreviated from the earlier name National Biscuit Company) is an American manufacturer of cookies and snacks headquartered in East Hanover, New Jersey. The company is a subsidiary of Illinois-based Mondelēz International.

Nabisco's 1,800,000-square-foot (170,000 m^{2}) plant in Chicago is the largest bakery in the world, employing more than 1,200 workers and producing around 320 million pounds (150 million kilograms) of snack foods annually. Its products include Chips Ahoy!, Belvita, Oreo cookies, Ritz Crackers, Teddy Grahams, Triscuit crackers, Fig Newtons, and Wheat Thins for the United States, United Kingdom, Mexico, Bolivia, Venezuela, and other parts of South America.

All Nabisco cookie or cracker products are branded Christie in Canada, after Canadian baker William Mellis Christie. Christie's flagship bakery in Toronto was demolished after Mondelēz shut it down in 2013. Nabisco opened corporate offices as the National Biscuit Company in the Home Insurance Building in the Chicago Loop in 1898, the world's first skyscraper.

== History ==
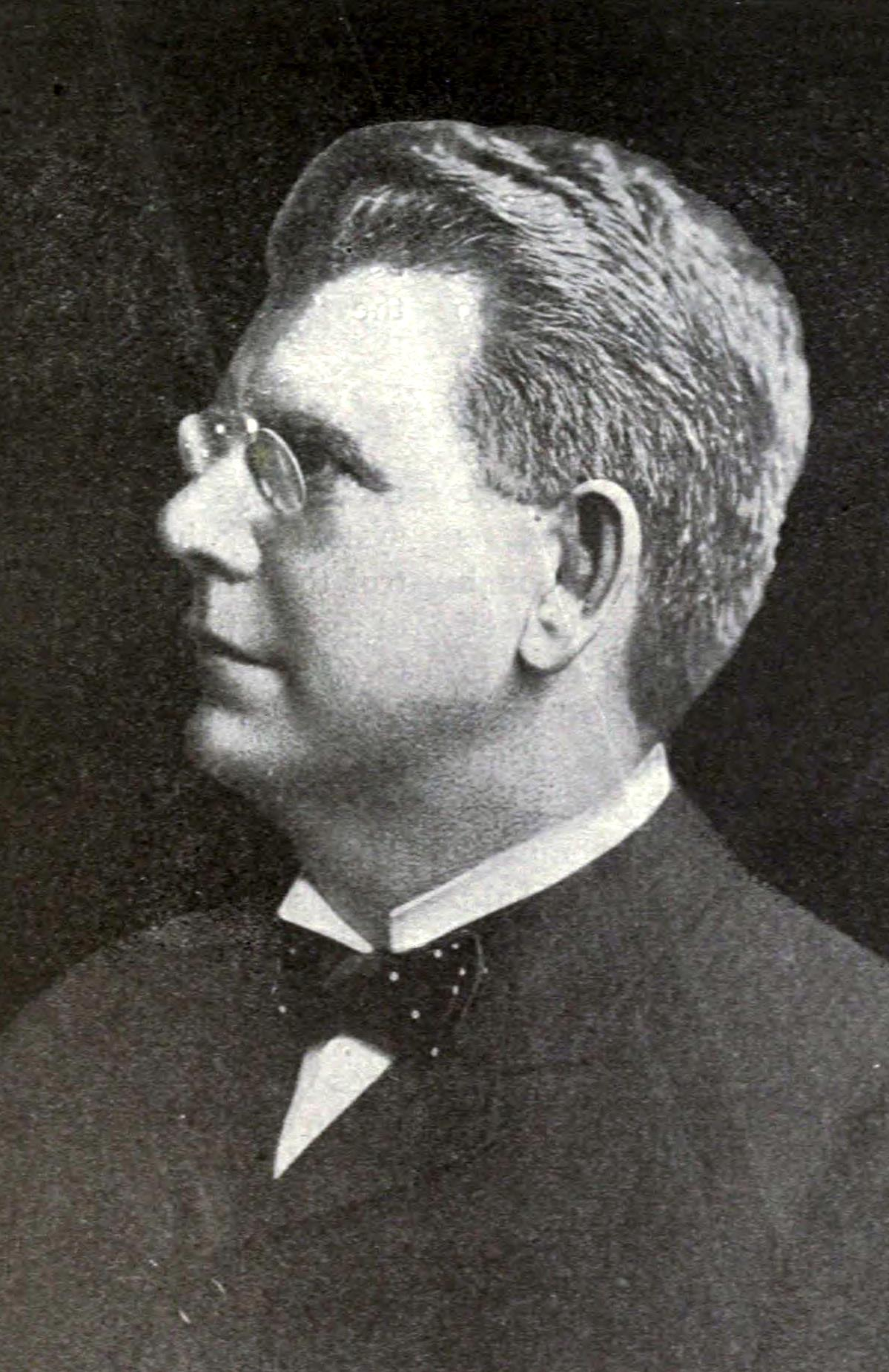
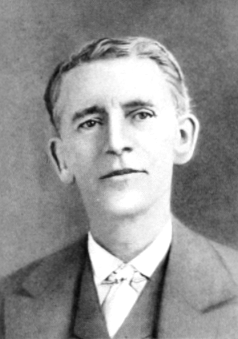
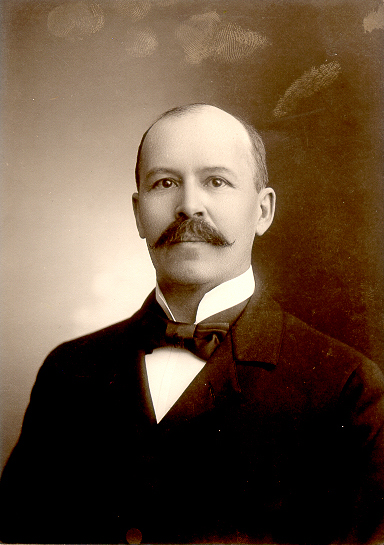
L-R: William Moore, Adolphus W. Green, and John G. Zeller, founders of the National Biscuit Company in 1898

Pearson & Sons Bakery opened in Massachusetts in 1792, and they made a biscuit called pilot bread for consumption on long sea voyages. In 1889, William H. Moore acquired Pearson & Sons Bakery, Josiah Bent Bakery, and six other bakeries to start the New York Biscuit Company. Chicago lawyer Adolphus Green (1843–1917) started the American Biscuit and Manufacturing Company in 1890 after acquiring 40 different bakeries. Then Moore, Green, and John Gottlieb Zeller (1849–1939, founder of Richmond Steam Bakery) all merged in 1898 to form the "National Biscuit Company", and Green was named president. Zeller was president of National Biscuit Company from 1923 to 1931.

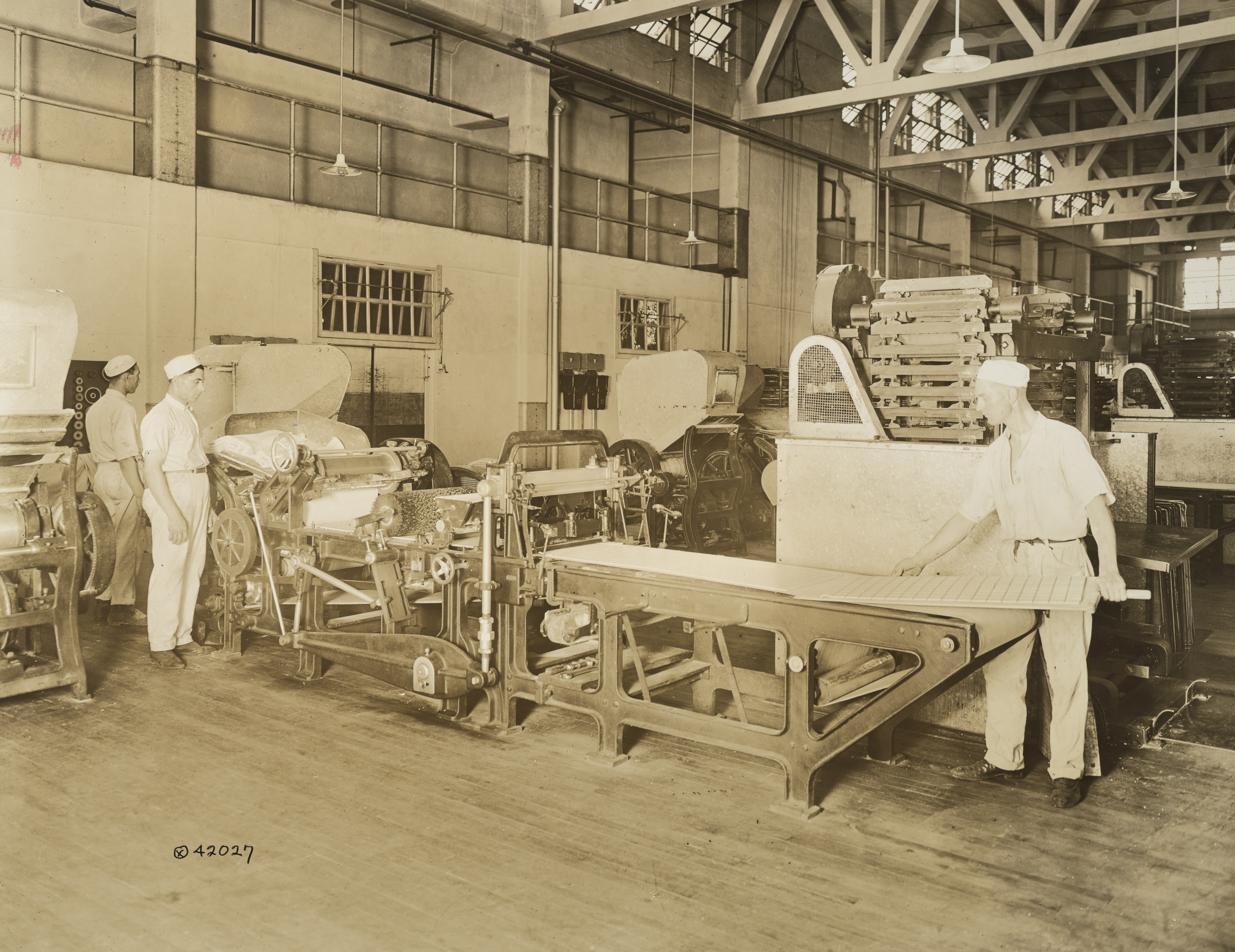
Manufacturing process of hard bread at the National Biscuit Co. plant in New York, c. 1917–18

The first use of the name "Nabisco" was in a cracker brand produced by National Biscuit Company in 1901. The firm later introduced Fig Newtons, Nabisco Wafers, Anola Wafers, Barnum's Animal Crackers (1902), Cameos (1910), Lorna Doones (1912), Oreos (1912), and Famous Chocolate Wafers (1924, which would be discontinued in 2023).

In 1924, the National Biscuit Company introduced a snack in a sealed packet called the Peanut Sandwich Packet. They soon added the Sorbetto Sandwich Packet. These allowed salesmen to sell to soda fountains, road stands, milk bars, lunch rooms, and news stands. Sales increased, and the company started to use the name NAB in 1928. The term Nabs today is used to generically mean any type of snack crackers, most commonly in the southern US.

Nabisco celebrated its golden anniversary in 1948, and Nabisco had become the corporate name by 1971. In 1981, Nabisco merged with Standard Brands to form "Nabisco Brands", which merged with R. J. Reynolds Tobacco Company in 1985 to form RJR Nabisco. Kraft General Foods acquired the Nabisco cold cereals from RJR Nabisco in 1993, and the cereal brands are now owned by Post Holdings. In 1999, Nabisco acquired Favorite Brands International. In 2000, Philip Morris Companies Inc. acquired Nabisco and merged it with Kraft Foods in one of the largest mergers in the food industry. In 2011, Kraft Foods announced that it was splitting into a grocery company and a snack food company. Nabisco became part of the snack-food business, which took the name Mondelēz International.

As of July 16, 2021, parent company Mondelēz International made the decision to close the Fair Lawn plant after 63 years forcing the majority of the 600 employees to move on and/or retire, accept jobs with other businesses or transfer within the company.

In August 2021, over 1,000 workers at several bakeries and distribution centers throughout the United States, organized under the Bakery, Confectionery, Tobacco Workers and Grain Millers' International Union, went on strike over disagreements regarding a new labor contract with Nabisco.

== Mergers and acquisitions ==
=== Acquisitions ===
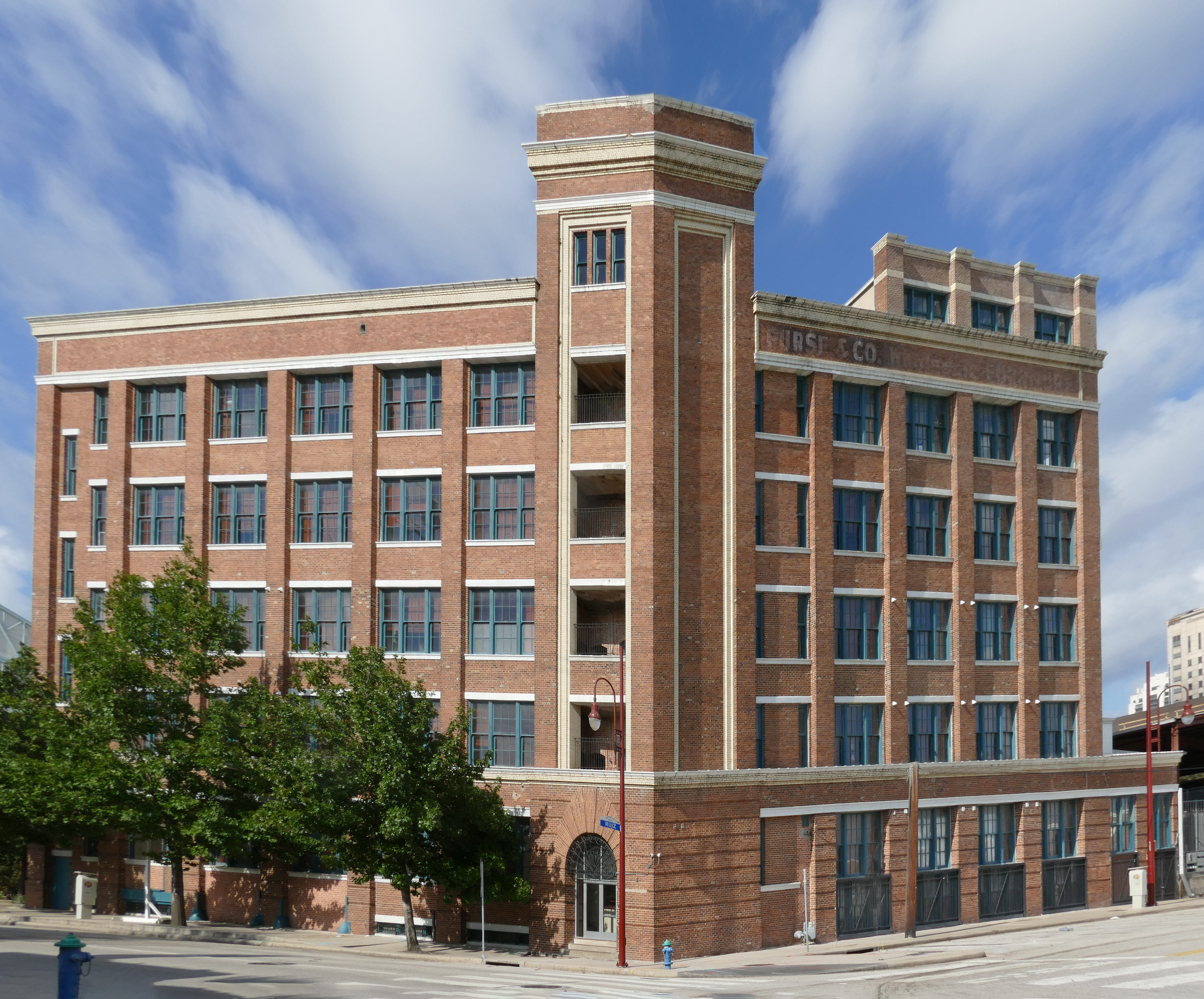
The National Biscuit Company Building, Houston, Texas. Nabisco occupied the building until the late 1940s or early 50s when it became a wholesale furniture place named Purse & Co.

The National Biscuit Company acquired the Shredded Wheat Company, maker of Triscuit and Shredded Wheat cereal, and Christie, Brown & Company of Toronto in 1928, but all of the Nabisco cookie and cracker products in Canada still use the name Christie. It also acquired F.H. Bennett Company, maker of Milk-Bone dog biscuits, in 1931.

In 1971, Nabisco bought J. B. Williams Co., a privately owned pharmaceuticals manufacturer. Williams continued to operate as a separate subsidiary. Nabisco sold Williams to Beecham Group in 1982 after nearly a decade of slumping sales.

In 1981, Nabisco merged with Standard Brands, maker of Planters Nuts, Baby Ruth and Butterfinger candy bars, Royal gelatin, Fleischmann's and Blue Bonnet margarines, amongst others. The company was then renamed Nabisco Brands, Inc. At that time, it also acquired the Life Savers brand from the E.R. Squibb Company, makers of Bubble Yum & Care-free gum. Commercials were revised as a result of the merger by January 1983.

=== R. J. Reynolds merger ===
In 1985, Nabisco was bought by R.J. Reynolds, forming "RJR Nabisco". After three years of mixed results, the company became one of the hotspots in the 1980s leveraged buyout mania. The company was in auction with two bidders: F. Ross Johnson, the company's president and CEO, and Kohlberg Kravis Roberts, a private equity partnership.

The company was sold to KKR in what was then the biggest leveraged buyout in history, described in the book Barbarians at the Gate: The Fall of RJR Nabisco, and a subsequent film.

=== Subsequent acquisitions and divestitures ===
In 1989, RJR Nabisco Inc. sold its Chun King foods division to Yeo Hiap Seng Limited and Fullerton Holdings Pte. Ltd for $52 million to reduce its debt from its $24.5 billion buyout by Kohlberg Kravis Roberts & Co.

In December 1989, RJR Nabisco sold its Del Monte canned fruits and vegetables business in South America to Polly Peck International PLC. One year later, in 1990 RJR Nabisco sold Curtiss Candy, which owned the Baby Ruth and Butterfinger brands, to Nestlé. RJR also sold LU, Belin and other European biscuit brands to Groupe Danone, only reunited in 2007 after Nabisco's present parent, Kraft Foods, bought Danone's biscuit operations for €5.3 billion.

In 1994, RJR sold its breakfast cereal business (primarily the Shredded Wheat franchise) to Kraft Foods Inc. and the international licenses to General Mills, which later became part of the Cereal Partners Worldwide joint venture with Nestlé.

Also in 1994, RJR acquired Rose Knox's Knox gelatin and integrated the Shredded wheat franchise into the Post Foods portfolio. Post continues to sell the product today.

In 1995, Nestlé agreed to buy the Ortega Mexican foods business from Nabisco Inc. That same year, RJR-Nabisco also acquired the North American margarine and table spreads business of Kraft foods. This purchase included Parkay, Touch of Butter and Chiffon.

In December 1997, Nabisco completed a three-year conversion of its Oreo production to meet Orthodox kosher standards, including removing lard and koshering roughly 100 industrial ovens.

In 1998, Nabisco Holdings announced the sale of its margarine and egg substitute business to ConAgra. In 1997, the brands of Fleishmann's, Blue Bonnet and Parkay had sales of $480 million. It also sold its College Inn broth brand to HJ Heinz and its Venezuelan Del Monte operations to Del Monte Foods.

In 1999, RJR Nabisco's food and tobacco empire fell apart when they sold its international tobacco division to Japan Tobacco for $7.8 billion.

In 2000 Nabisco Holdings together with several investors (as Finalrealm) acquired United Biscuits, As part of the transaction, United Biscuits acquired Nabisco's European businesses and divested Far East (China, Hong Kong, and Taiwan) business to Nabisco. Nabisco became a leading shareholder in United Biscuits (the position that was inherited by Kraft Foods until 2006). Nabisco then sold its gum and mint business to Hershey Foods Corp. in November of this year.

The Altria Group (formerly Philip Morris) acquired Nabisco (sans Bubble Yum which was sold to Hershey) in 2000 for about $19.2 billion. Philip Morris then combined Nabisco with Kraft. That acquisition was approved by the Federal Trade Commission subject to the divestiture of products in five areas: three Jell-O and Royal brands types of products (dry-mix gelatin dessert, dry-mix pudding, no-bake desserts), intense mints (such as Altoids), and baking powder. Kraft Foods, at the time also a subsidiary of Altria, merged with Nabisco.

In 2006, Nabisco sold its Milk-Bone pet snacks to Del Monte Foods Co. for $580 million. Altria spun-off Kraft Food along with its Nabisco subsidiary in 2007. In January 2007, Kraft sold Cream of Wheat to B&G Foods.

In 2021, Nabisco closed its factory in Fair Lawn, NJ after 63 years of operation. The company had produced Oreos, Ritz crackers, Lorna Doone, and Teddy Grahams there since 1958. The plant had 600 workers at the moment of closure. According to Nabisco, "Both Fair Lawn and Atlanta are no longer strategic assets from a geographic footprint perspective and both face significant operational challenges, including aging infrastructure and outdated production capabilities, which would have required significant investment to bring them to the modernized state required for the future" Another plant in Atlanta had been closed one month earlier.

== Legal battles ==
In 1997, the National Advertising Division of the Council of Better Business Bureau became concerned with an ad campaign for Planters Deluxe Mixed Nuts. The initial commercial featured a man and monkey deserted on an island. They discover a crate of Planters peanuts and rejoice in the peanuts' positive health facts.

Nabisco made a detailed statement describing how their peanuts were healthier than most other snack products, going as far as comparing the nutritional facts of Planters peanuts to those of potato chips, Cheddar cheese chips, and popcorn. Technically, the commercials complied with United States Food and Drug Administration regulations, and they were allowed to continue. However, as requested by the National Advertising Division, Nabisco agreed to make fat content disclosure more conspicuous in future commercials.

The company's A1 Steak Sauce was the subject of a suit filed against Arnie Kaye in US District Court on March 13, 1990. Kaye's delicatessen used a homemade sauce called "A2 Sauce," sold in both the International Deli and Stew Leonard's supermarkets in Westport, Connecticut. Summary judgement was rendered on March 18, 1991, by Judge Eginton who found in favor of Nabsico and ordered that they were entitled to recoup all profits from the sale of "A.2." sauce as well as attorney's fees.

== Brands and products ==
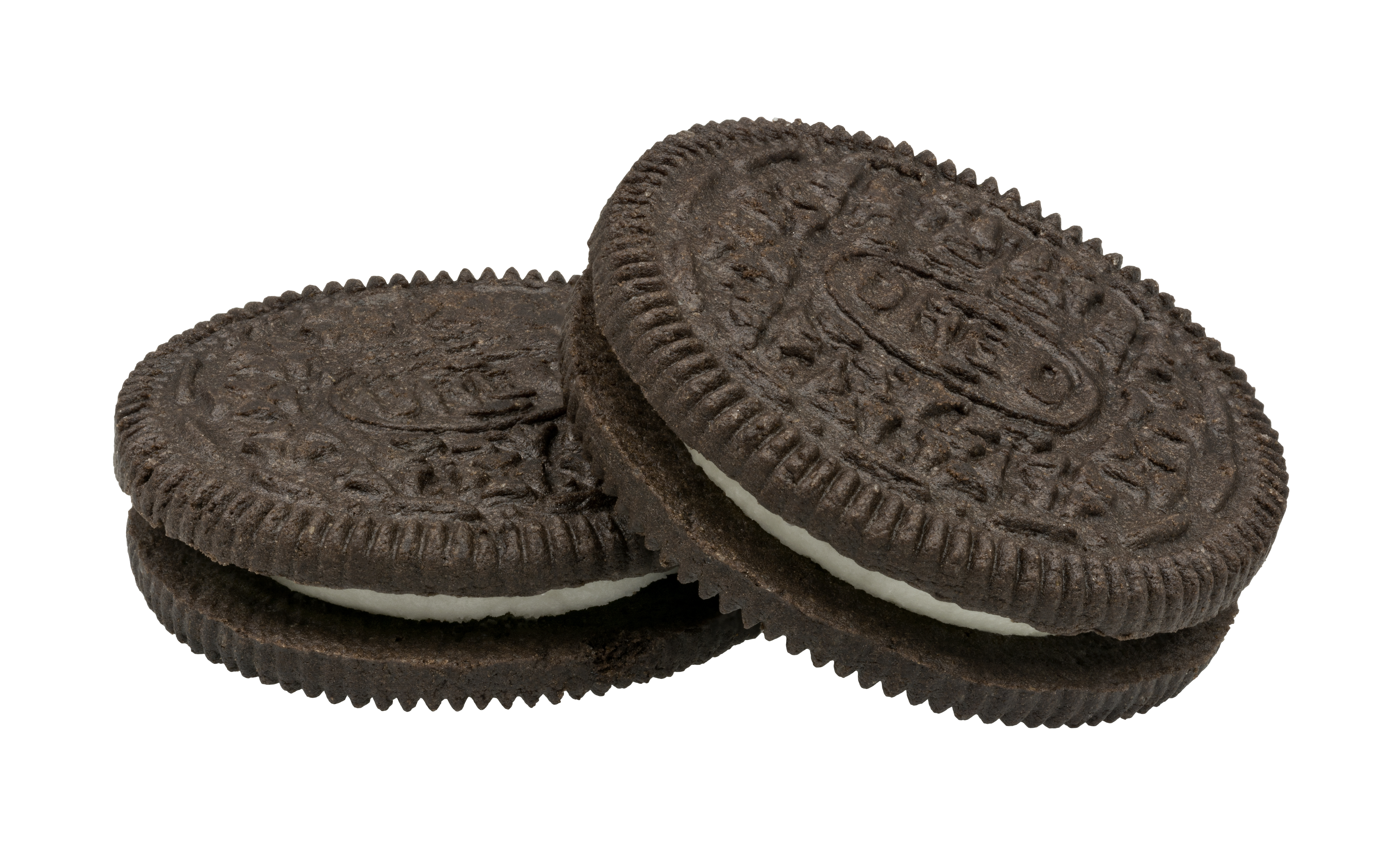
The Oreo, Nabisco's best-selling cookie

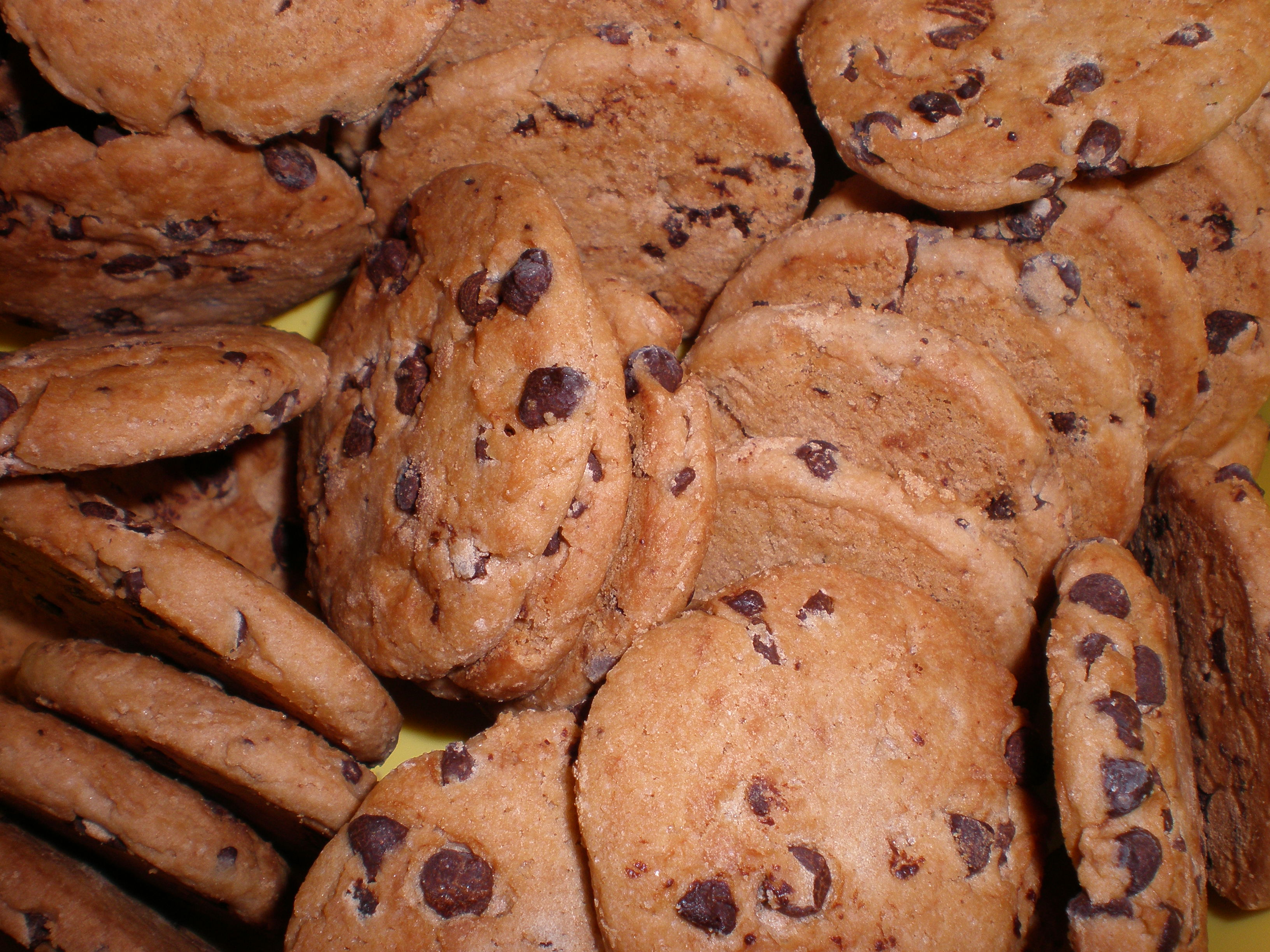
Chips Ahoy! chocolate chip cookies

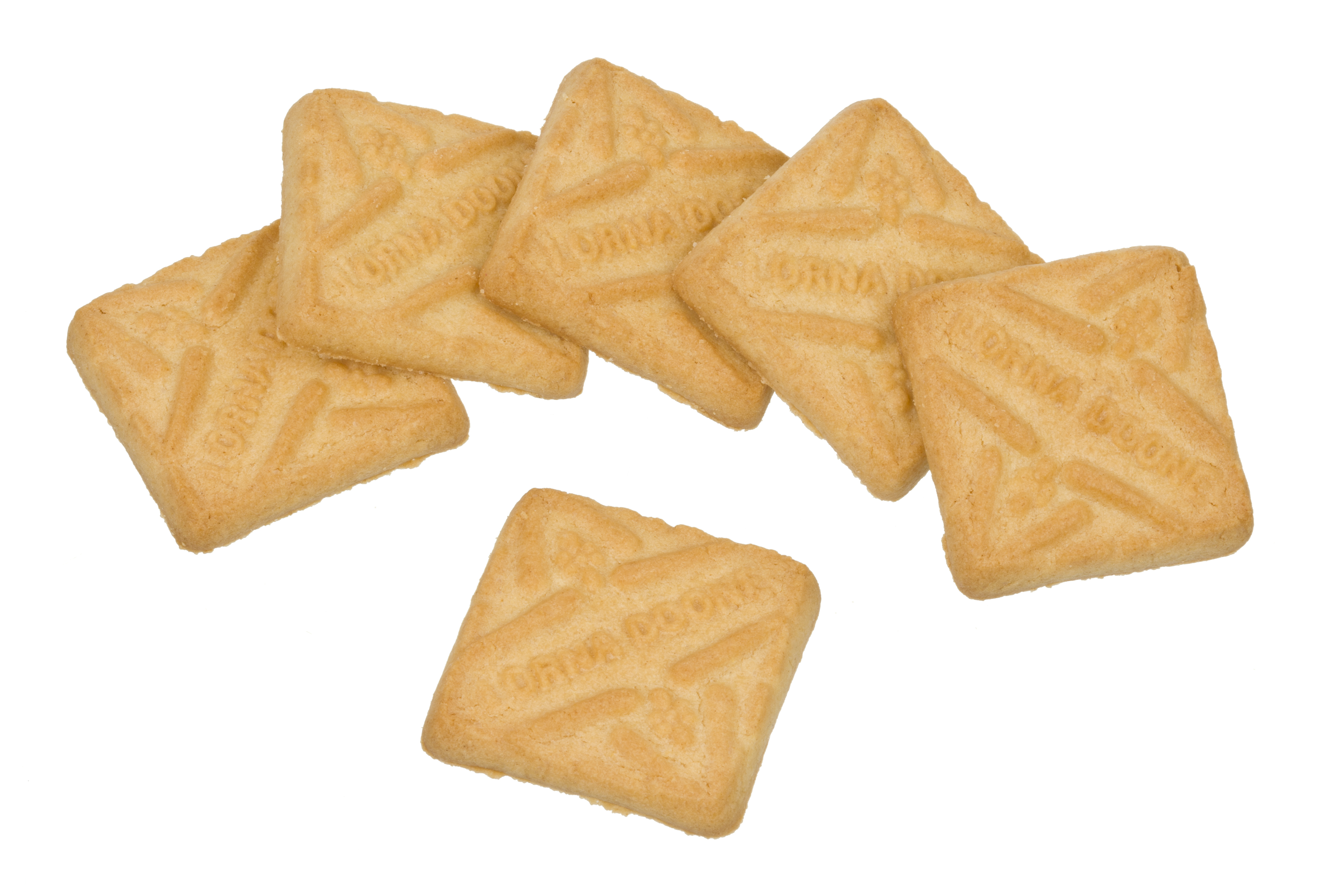
Lorna Doone cookies

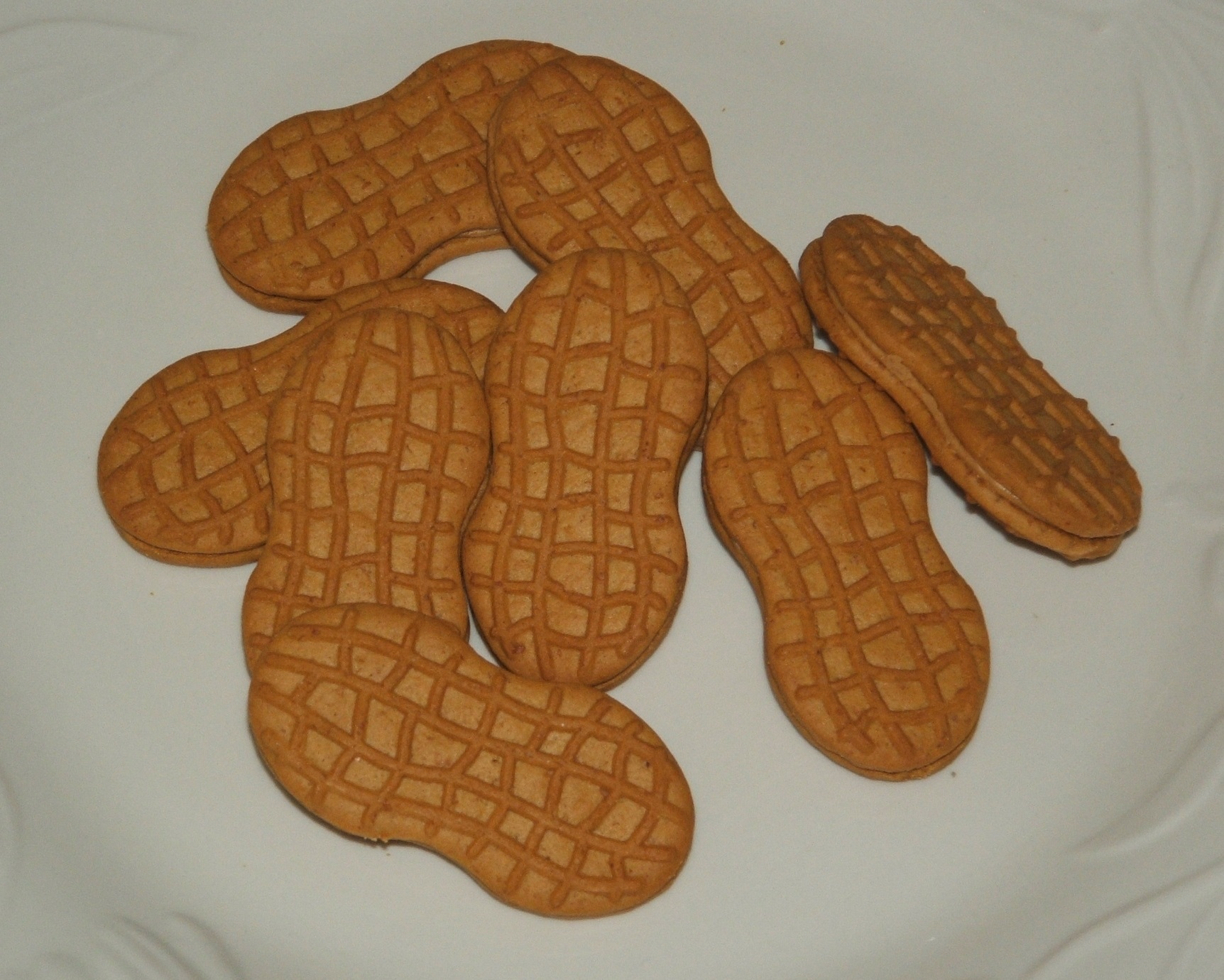
Nutter Butter cookies

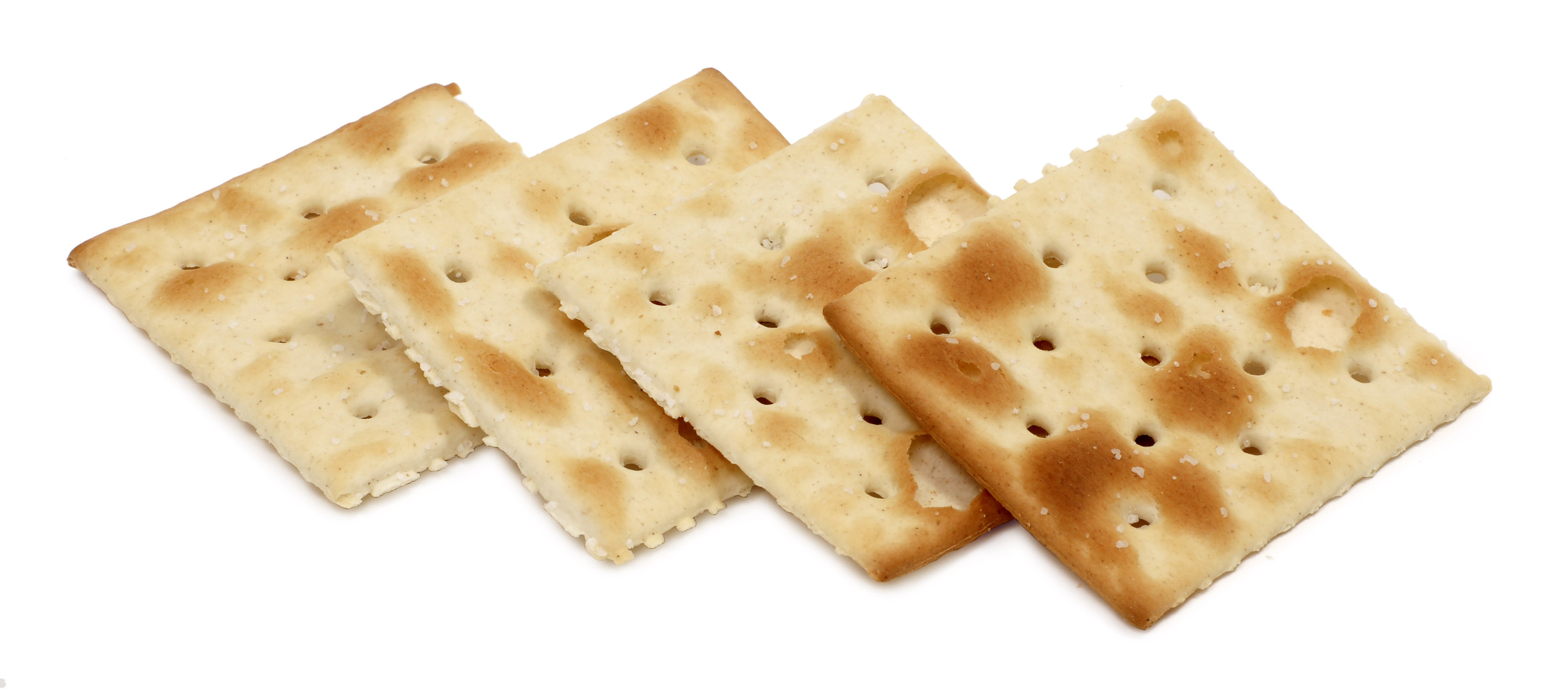
Premium saltines

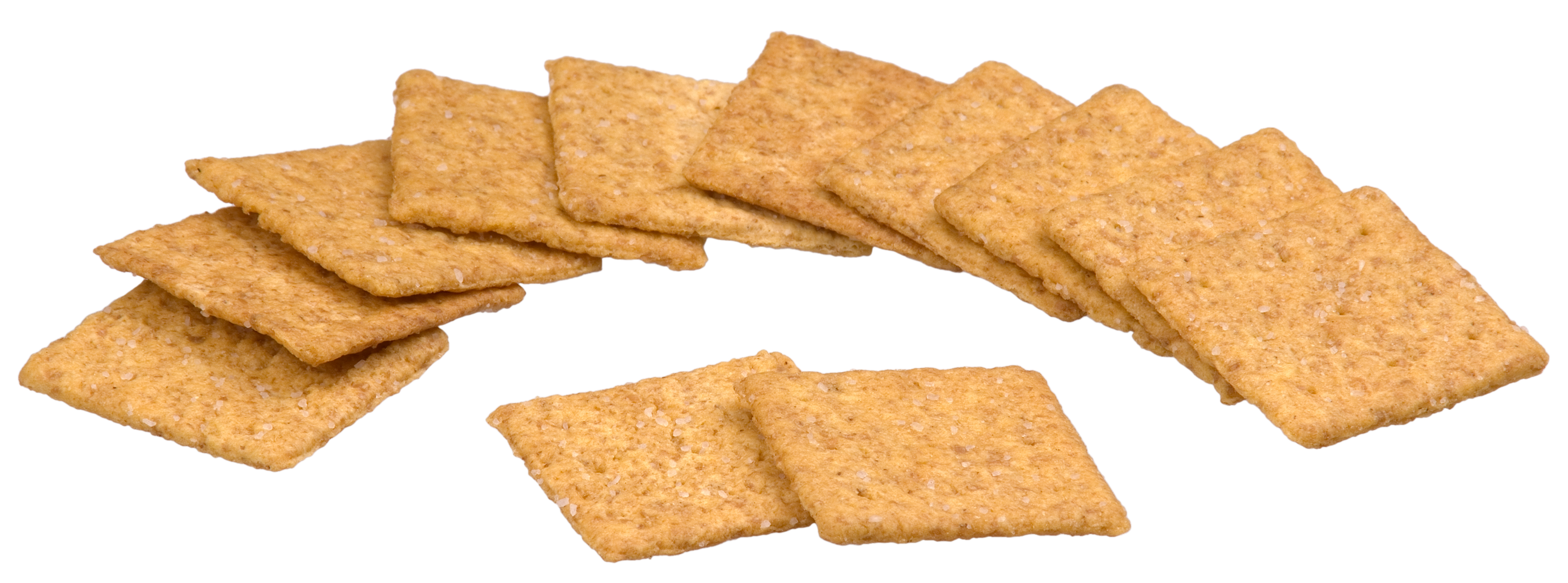
Original Wheat Thins

- 100 Calorie Packs
- Arrowroot
- Bacon Dippers
- Belvita
- Better Cheddars
- Cameo
- Captain's Table
- Cheese Nips
- Chips Ahoy!
- Chicken in a Biskit
- Chocolate Wafers (discontinued in 2023)
- Club Social
- Corn Diggers
- Crispers (Canada)
- Dad's Cookie (c.1929 Canada)
- Dizzy Grizzlies
- Doo Dads
- Frollini de Oro Saiwa
- Fudgee-O Cookies (Canada)
- Giggles
- Good Thins
- HeyDay Cookie Bars
- Honey Maid
- Hony Bran
- In A Biskit
- Kool Stuf toaster pastry
- Kraker Bran
- Lorna Doone
- Mallomars chocolate marshmallow
- Mister Salty Pretzels
- Nabisco Classics
- Newtons
- Nilla
- Nutter Butter
- Orchard Crisps
- Oreo
  - List of Oreo varieties
- Oro Saiwa
- Pecanz
- Pirate
- Potato Chipsters
- Premium Plus
- Premium Saltines
- Ritz Crackers
- Rice Thins
- Royal gelatin dessert
- Royal Lunch
- Sea Rounds
- Shredded wheat
- Social Tea
- Sportz
- Stoned Wheat Thins - discontinued
- Sugar Rings
- Team Flakes
- Teddy Grahams
- Thinsations
- Toasted Chips
- Toastettes
- Triscuit
- Twigs
- Uneeda Biscuit
- Urra Saiwa
- Wheat Squares
- Wheat Thins
- Zu Zu Ginger Snaps
- Zwieback Toast

== Corporate image ==
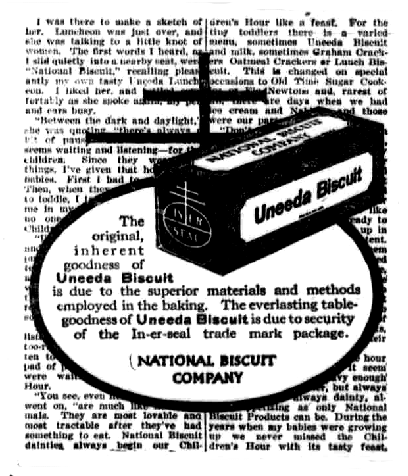
(Left): newspaper ad for the Uneeda biscuits from 1919; the Nabisco "antenna" trademark can be seen behind the product; (right): the current Nabisco logo, designed by designer Gerard Huerta

Nabisco's trademark is a diagonal ellipse with a series of antenna-like lines protruding from the top ("Orb and Cross" or Globus cruciger). It forms the base of its logo and can be seen imprinted on Oreo cookies, in addition to Nabisco product boxes and literature. The trademark is derived from a medieval Venetian printer's mark that represented "the triumph of the moral and spiritual over the evil and the material".

The current update of the familiar Nabisco trademark was designed by American typographer and graphic designer Gerard Huerta, who has created many famous logos for corporate identity and branding as well as the movie and music industries, such as AC/DC's, the most tattooed logo in history.

== Sponsorship ==
From 2002 to 2005, Nabisco and Kraft jointly sponsored both Dale Earnhardt, Inc., and Roush Racing. Earnhardt Jr. won four races in a row at Daytona International Speedway with Nabisco sponsorship. Kraft and Nabisco sponsored a part-time Sprint Cup effort in car #81 driven by Jason Keller and John Andretti and fielded by Dale Earnhardt, Inc. Nabisco also sponsored Dale Earnhardt Jr. in the 2010 Subway Jalapeño 250 at Daytona International Speedway in July 2010 with their Oreo/Ritz brands and Tony Stewart with the Ritz brand in the 2010 DRIVE4COPD 300 at Daytona International Speedway in 2010.
