= Premium Plus =

Brand name of soda crackers

Premium
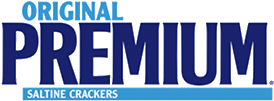

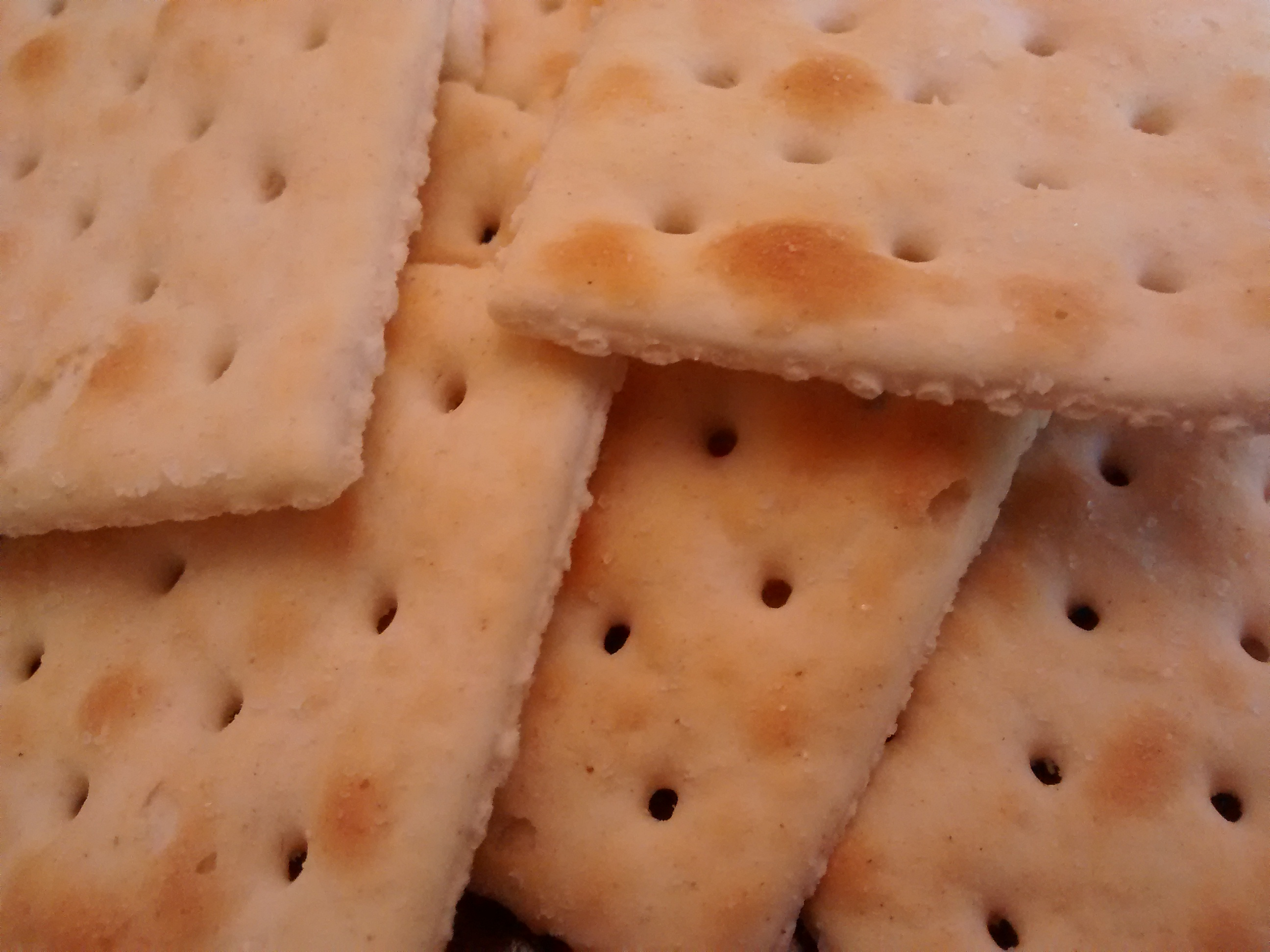
- Product type: Cracker
- Current owner: Mondelez International
- Country: U.S.
- Introduced: 1876
- Previous owners: Nabisco

Premium (Premium Saltine Crackers) is a brand of soda cracker produced by Nabisco, which were first introduced in 1876. It is known as Premium Plus (Premium Plus Salted Tops) in Canada, under the Christie (formerly, Mr. Christie) banner. In the United States it is marketed as "Original Premium."

It is currently sold in these flavours: Unsalted (Original), Salted, Five Grain, and Whole Wheat.

The crackers are square in shape but round versions have been marketed as well.

== Packaging ==
The crackers are typically sold in boxes containing 4 "sleeves" of crackers sealed in plastic inside, for the home consumer. Larger packages containing 8 or 12 "sleeves" are also available. Bulk packages of individualized servings containing two or four crackers are also available, and are frequently used at restaurants. Occasionally the crackers are sold in tin cans.

Boxes are white in the United States, and either red or brown in Canada; the brown boxes are used for whole wheat varieties.

== Controversy ==
In 1989, Phil Sokolof, an Omaha millionaire published ads in the Los Angeles Times accusing Nabisco of including unhealthy saturated fats in its products. At the time, Nabisco Saltine Crackers still contained lard, a semi-solid white fat product obtained by rendering the fatty tissue of a pig. At some point in the 1990s the company switched to a more vegetarian-friendly vegetable oil.
