= Westminster Cracker Company =

American food company

- Type: Private
- Industry: Food industry
- Founded: Westminster, Massachusetts, United States, 1828
- Headquarters: Rutland, Vermont, United States
- Products: Crackers, Oyster crackers
- Website: www.westminstercrackers.com

The Westminster Cracker Company is a New England–based company established in Westminster, Massachusetts, in 1828. The original building, which is depicted in its product labeling, still stands in the center of Westminster, although it has not been used for manufacturing for decades. The company is now based in Rutland, Vermont.

== History ==
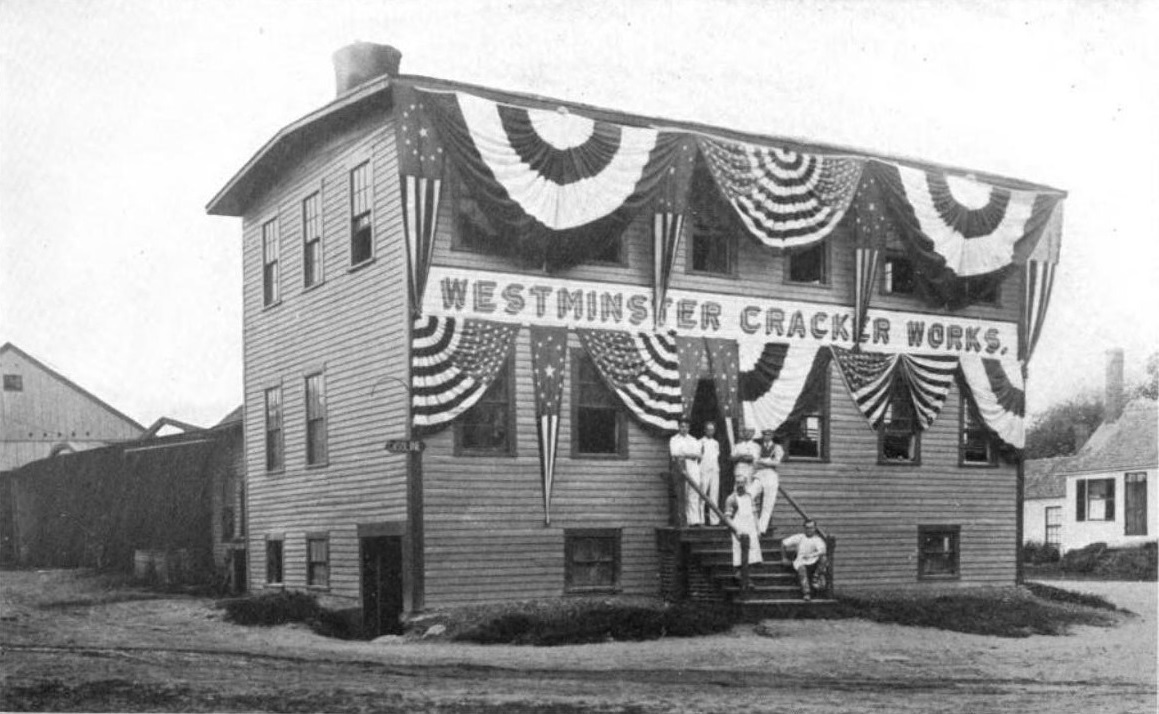
Westminster Cracker Works in 1909, adorned in honor of the town's 150th anniversary celebration

In 1828, the Westminster Cracker Factory was founded. They operated out of a red clapboard building in Westminster, Massachusetts. They began manufacture of at least three cracker varieties: "common crackers, the butter cracker," and the oyster cracker. During its early days, the factory's machinery was powered by a horse on a treadmill; steam power followed, and by 1922, the bakery was electrified.

In 1909, a photograph of the decorated cracker factory was published in the 150th Anniversary Celebration of the Town of Westminster, Massachusetts by Wilbur F. Whitney. The company's owners, C. C. Dawley & Sons, were participants of that year's float, constituting "5 decorated teams representing the baking business." "Mrs. C. C. Dawley" was a member of the parade committee.

By Christmas of 1912, the factory was "turning out 100 bbls [barrels] of crackers daily."

The 1913 Directory of Massachusetts Manufactures lists the Westminster Bakery as owned by C. C. Dawley & Sons.

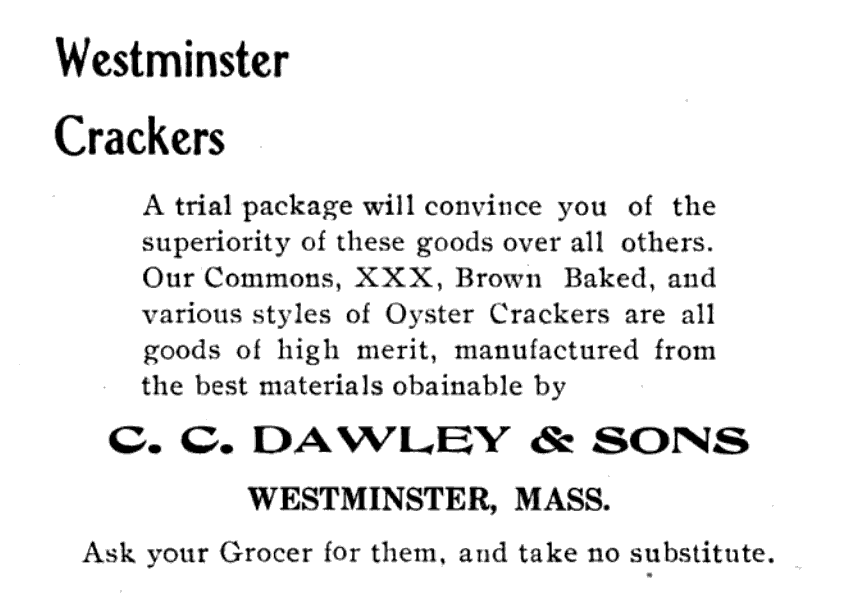
1908 advertisement in Choice Selection of Tested Recipes From Many Households

Circa 1922, their slogan was "Westminster Crackers: As good as can be made."

Westminster Cracker Company was owned by the Dawley family for more than 100 years. Dawley & Shepard, Inc., headed by President David Dawley, sold its breading factory to the Pillsbury Company in 1982. The rights to make Westminster Crackers were retained by Peter Dawley who started a new Westminster Cracker company in Rutland in 1988. The company makes other types of crackers, but the most popular contemporary product is the oyster cracker, which is served by restaurants throughout the United States.

Since 2015, the Westminster Village Foundation has hosted the Westminster Cracker Festival, which celebrates the company's achievements. In 2018, thousands were in attendance, and the event featured "a 5K race, live music throughout the day, food vendors, games and [chili cook-offs topped with the crackers], and a beer and wine garden." One game is a photo contest titled "Westminster Crackers are Everywhere," wherein residents are encouraged to submit creative photographs of them being served the cracker far from home; pictures have included the crackers in Alaska, on beaches, and on cruise ships. As of 2023, the Cracker Festival continues to be hosted as a free October event for all, rain or shine.

== See also ==
- Clam chowder, a Northeastern soup often served with oyster crackers
- Cracker
