= Uneeda Biscuit =

Defunct soda cracker brand

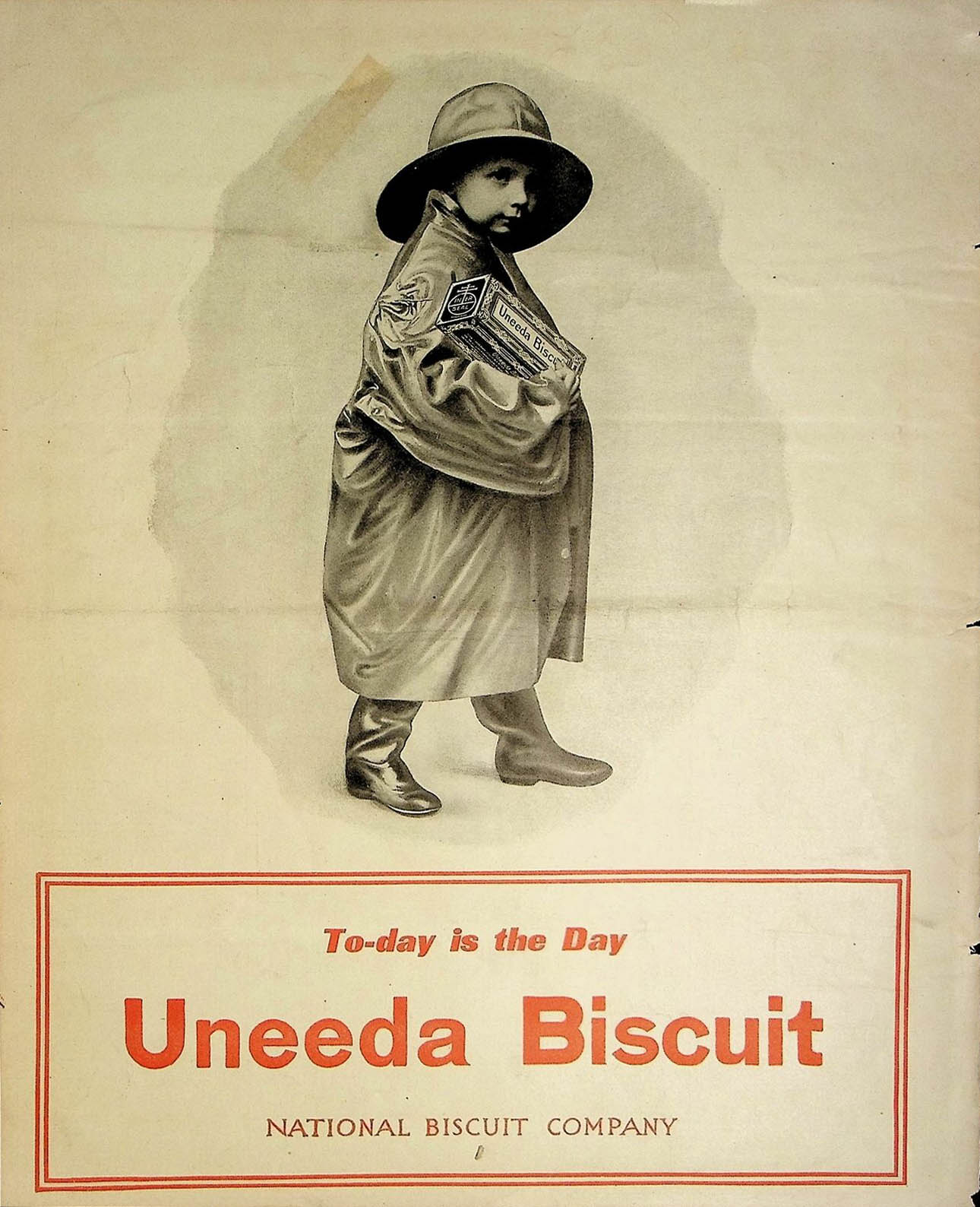
- Uneeda Biscuit advertisement from 1904.
- Current owner: Nabisco
- Introduced: 1890s
- Discontinued: 2009

Uneeda Biscuit was a brand of soda cracker created by the National Biscuit Company. The brand was discontinued in 2009.

== History ==
Uneeda Biscuit were introduced in the 1890s as a product of the National Biscuit Company. In those days, crackers were packaged, shipped, stored in and sold directly from large cracker barrels where they were exposed to air and went stale relatively quickly. Uneeda biscuits were lighter, flakier, and stayed crisper longer due to their packaging. In 1896, National Biscuit Company spent $1 million in a branding campaign to compete with Cracker Jack, a competitor of Uneeda Biscuits. The packaging featured a boy in a raincoat and has been considered one of the original consumer packaging concepts that did not rely on identity recognition. The boy in the raincoat signified the way the packaging kept moisture out of the product by using interfolded wax paper and cardboard.

In 1902, a factory was built in Shreveport, Louisiana to manufacture Uneeda. At the time, it was the tallest privately owned building in the city.

The Uneeda brand was discontinued by Nabisco in 2009.
