= Cheese cracker =

Type of cracker

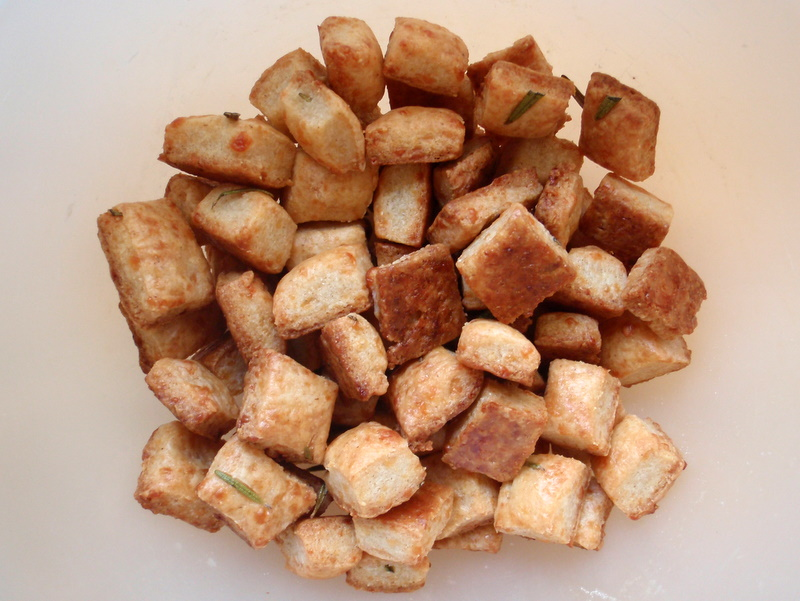
- Homemade cheese crackers spiced with rosemary and cinnamon
- Type: Cracker
- Course: Main Meal (in some countries, served as a special course)
- Variations: Goldfish, Cheddars, Cheese Nips, Cheez-It

The cheese cracker is a type of cracker prepared using cheese as a main ingredient. Additional common cracker ingredients are typically used, such as grain, flour, shortening, leavening, salt and various seasonings. The ingredients are formed into a dough, and the individual crackers are then prepared. Some cheese crackers are prepared using fermented dough. Cheese crackers are typically baked. Another method of preparing cheese crackers involves placing cheese atop warm crackers. Cheese crackers have been described as a "high-calorie snack", which is due to a higher fat content compared to other types of crackers.

== Uses ==
In addition to being a snack food, cheese cracker crumbs are sometimes used in recipes as an ingredient, and crumbs or whole crackers are sometimes used as a garnish on various foods. Cheese crackers are also sometimes served as a side dish to accompany foods.

== Commercial brands ==
Examples of mass-produced commercial cheese cracker brands include Better Cheddars, Cheddars, Cheese Nips, Cheez-It and Goldfish.

- Better Cheddars is a brand of baked Cheddar cheese snack cracker manufactured by Nabisco, a subsidiary of Mondelēz International.
- Cheddars are a brand of baked Cheddar cheese-flavoured British-style savoury biscuit, having a granular crumbly texture unlike crackers which are harder, more brittle and flaky in texture. They are manufactured by McVitie's.
- Cheese Nips were small cheese-flavored crackers They were manufactured by Mondelēz International under its brand, Nabisco. As of 2020, Cheese Nips have since been discontinued according to a Nabisco representative. They are still sold in Canada by a brand named "Christie" (which is the Canadian counterpart of Nabisco, and also a subsidiary of Mondelēz International) as "Ritz Cheese Nibs" as of 2022, however.
- Cheez-It is a cheese cracker manufactured by the Kellogg Company through its Sunshine Biscuits division. Cheez-Its were introduced in 1921 by the Green and Green company of Dayton, Ohio, and through a series of corporate mergers, the brand was acquired by the Sunshine subdivision of Keebler Company in 1996. Keebler, in turn, was acquired by Kellogg in 2001.
- Goldfish are fish-shaped cheese crackers manufactured by Pepperidge Farm, a division of the Campbell's.
Cheese cracker brands

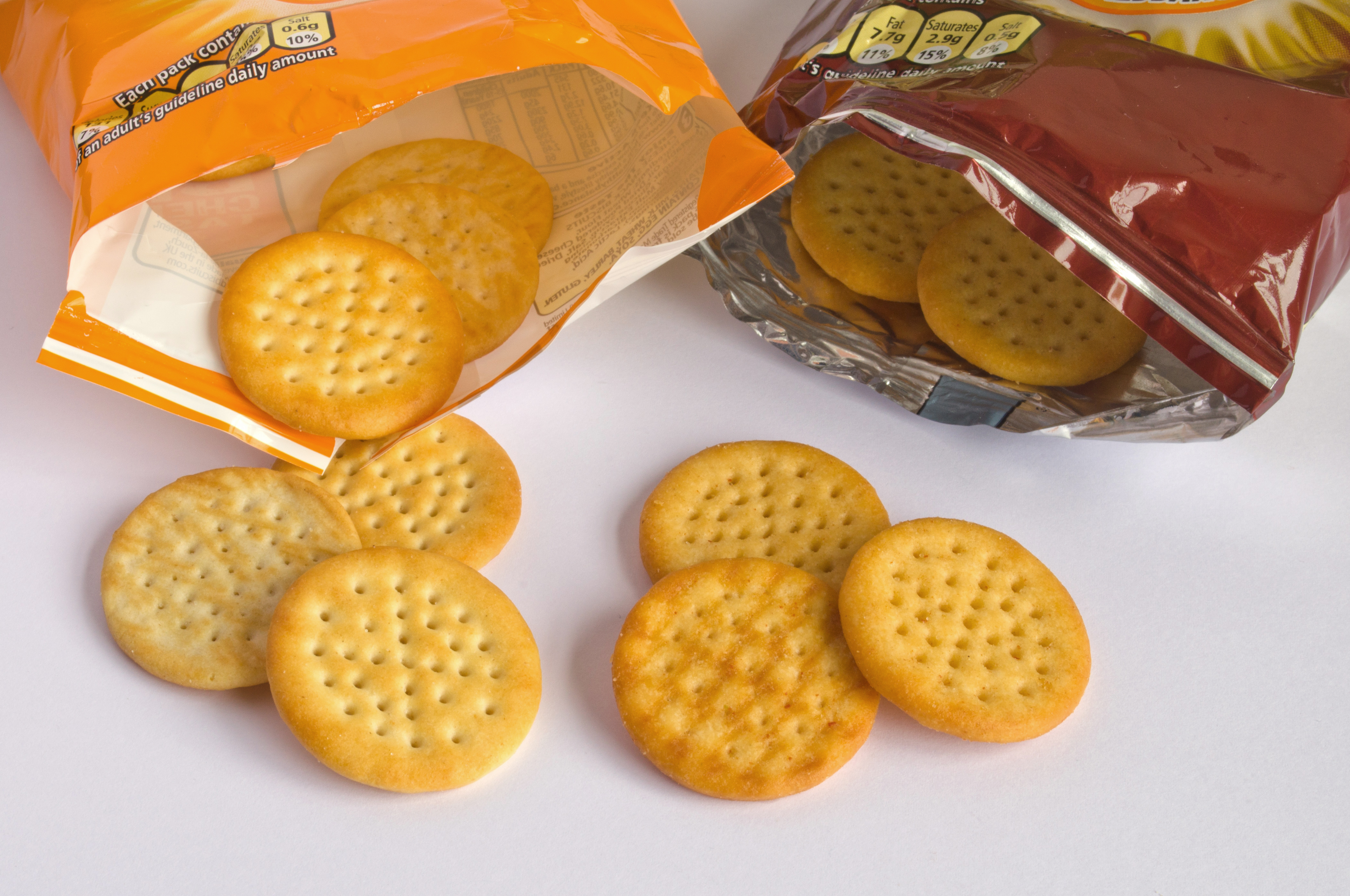
Original-flavor Mini Cheddars at left and BBQ flavor (right)

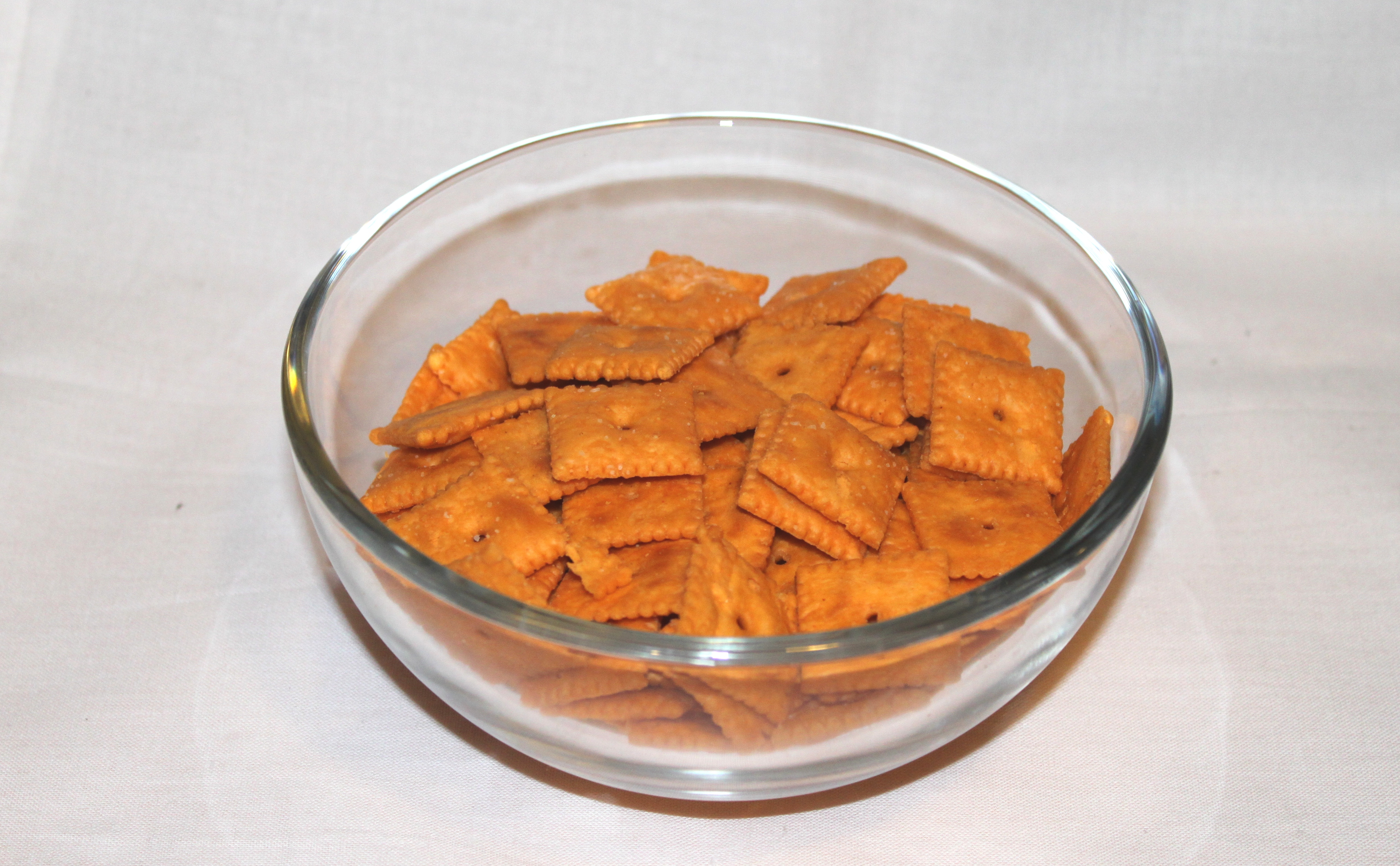
Cheese Nips

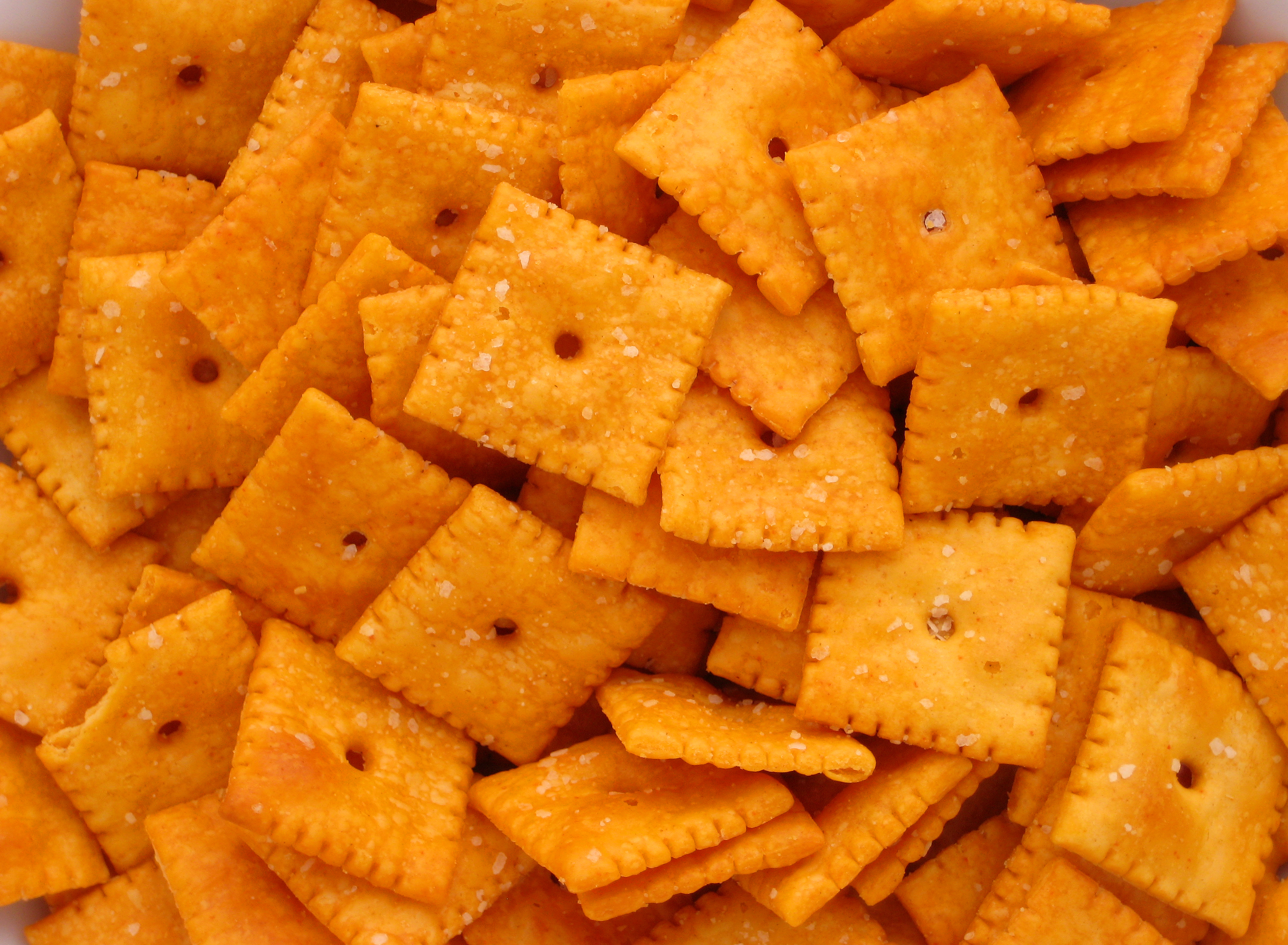
Regular Cheez-It crackers

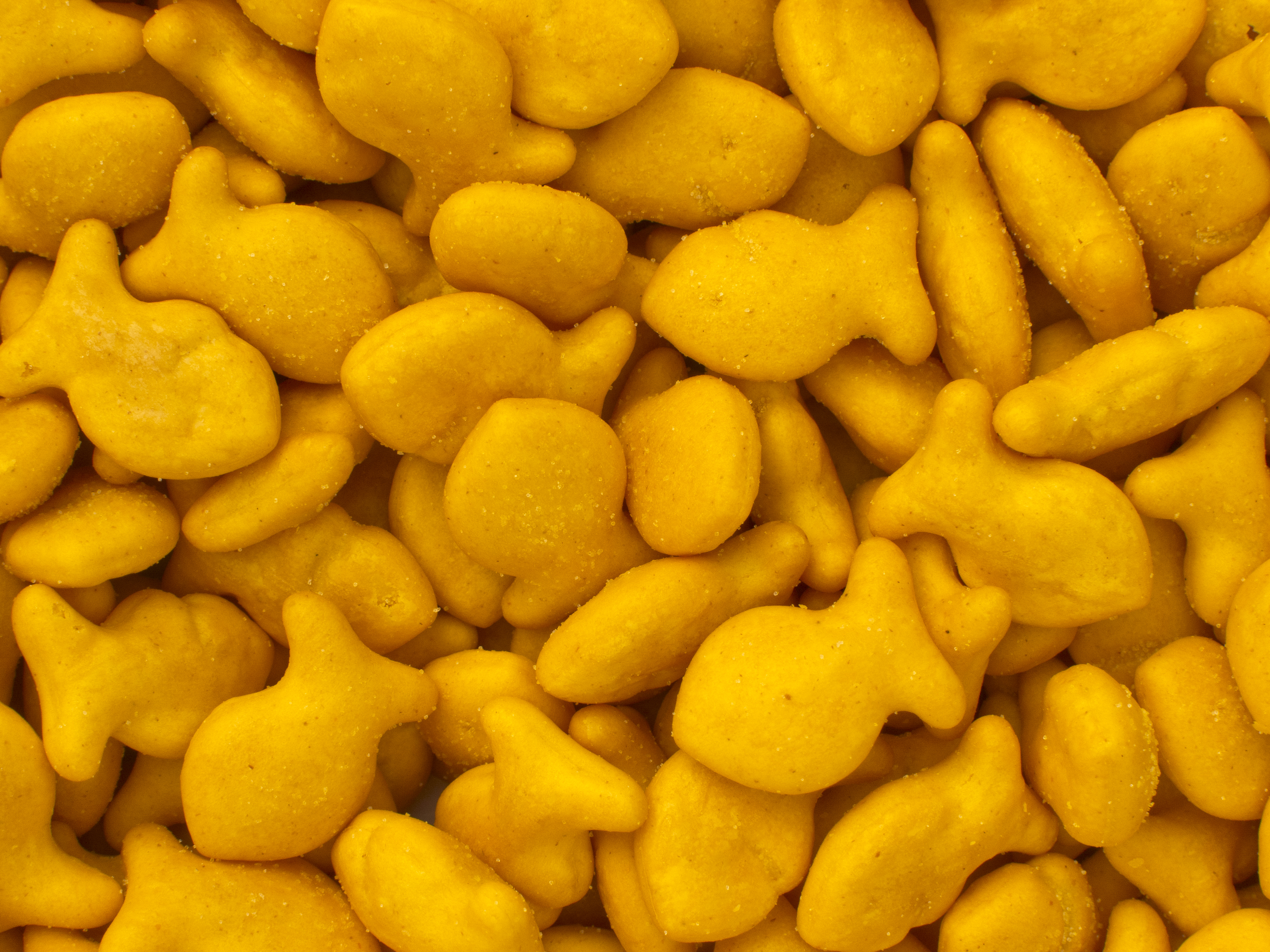
Goldfish

== See also ==
- Cheese and crackers
- List of crackers
