= Goldfish (cracker) =

Fish-shaped cracker

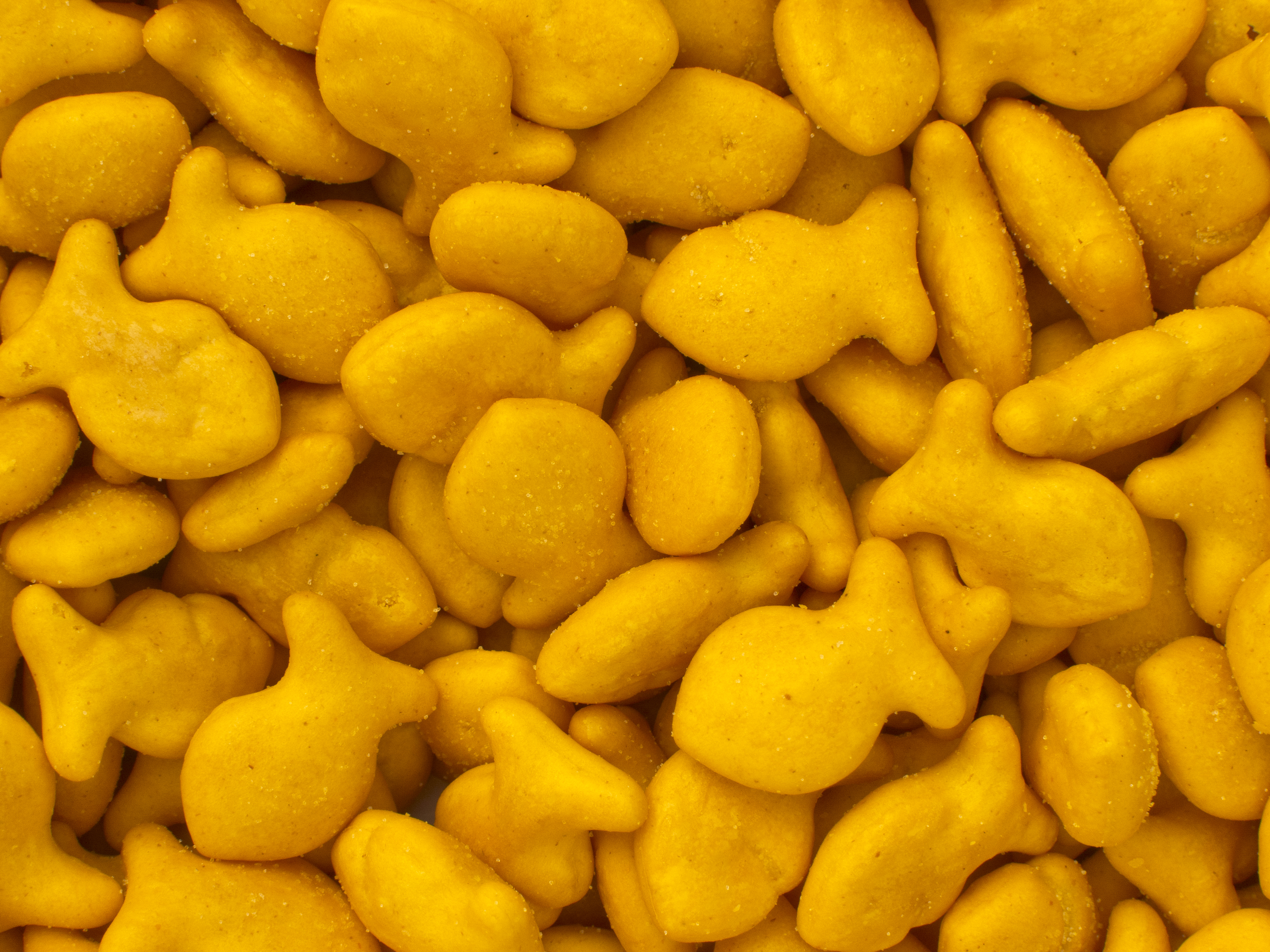
- Cheddar Goldfish crackers
- Product type: Crackers
- Current owner: Pepperidge Farm
- Country: Switzerland
- Introduced: 1962; 64 years ago
- Markets: Worldwide, except for Armenia, Iran, North Korea, and Syria
- Previous owners: Kambly
- Tagline: "The snack that smiles back"
- Website: www.goldfishcrackers.com

Goldfish is a brand of fish-shaped crackers with a small imprint of an eye and a smile manufactured by Pepperidge Farm, which is a division of Campbell's. The brand's current marketing and product packaging incorporate this feature of the product: "The snack that smiles back! Goldfish!", reinforced by Finn, the smiling goldfish mascot with sunglasses. The product is marketed as a "baked snack cracker" on the label with various flavors and varieties.

== History ==
Oscar J. Kambly originally invented goldfish crackers at Swiss biscuit manufacturer Kambly in 1958 to celebrate his wife, who was a Pisces, an astrological symbol whose shape is of a fish. Pepperidge Farm founder Margaret Rudkin introduced Goldfish crackers to the United States in 1962 after having tried them while on vacation in Switzerland. The five initial flavors of Goldfish crackers launched in the US were lightly salted (later designated "original"), cheese, barbecue, pizza, and smoky. Cheddar cheese, the brand's most popular flavor, was not introduced until 1966. In 1988, astronauts brought Goldfish Crackers with them on the STS-26, Discovery. In 1997, the smiley face was added to Goldfish, appearing on approximately 40% of the crackers.

=== 2000s ===
Pepperidge Farm has expanded the Goldfish brand significantly in recent years, introducing numerous limited-time flavors and varieties beyond the traditional cheddar and pretzel options. These included Mega Bites (larger Goldfish crackers) in 2022 and limited-edition flavors such as Dunkin' Pumpkin Spice Grahams and Frank's RedHot. Due to its popularity, the Frank's RedHot flavor has since been added to the permanent lineup. The company has also experimented with potato-based Goldfish crisps to achieve a potato chip-like flavor.

According to Campbell Soup Company, these innovations have contributed to Goldfish's position as the fastest-growing cracker brand in the United States in 2024, with sales increasing by 33% since 2021. In October 2024, the company announced that online sales of the product would be branded as "Chilean Sea Bass" for one week to appeal for adults.

== Flavors ==
Goldfish crackers are available in many varieties, but start/end dates of production are unknown:

- Original, also known as Saltine
- Cheddar
- Whole Grain Cheddar and Colors
- Parmesan
- Pretzel
- Pizza
- Grahams (Vanilla Cupcake and S'mores)
- Flavor Blasted (Xtra Cheddar, Cheddar & Sour Cream (discontinued), Salt and Vinegar (discontinued), Cheddar Jack'd, Sour Cream & Onion (discontinued), Sharp White Cheddar (discontinued), Xtra Cheesy Pizza)
- Mix
- Frank's RedHot
- "Awesome Sauce" (2025 limited edition variety)
- Old Bay Seasoned (limited time offering)
- Jalapeño Popper
- Spicy Dill Pickle (limited time)

=== Different shapes and colors ===
These are differently shaped or sized Goldfish variants.

- Baby Goldfish (these are several sizes smaller than the original Goldfish, but they have the same flavor)
- Colors (same shape and flavor as the cheddar variety but with different colors that are derived from natural sources. The current colors are yellow, orange, red, and green)
- Crisps (currently available in Spicy Dill Pickle, Salt and Vinegar, Barbecue, Sour Cream and Onion, and Cheddar varieties)
- Mickey Mouse (red crackers in the shape of Mickey's head)
- Mega Bites (they are several times larger in size than the original. They currently come in both Sharp Cheddar and Cheddar Jalapeño varieties.)
- Star Wars (shaped differently, same as the cheddar variety)
- Disney Princess (crackers in the shape of Cinderella, Jasmine, and Moana along with pink and regular-colored Goldfish crackers)
- Pokémon (yellow, red, blue, and green crackers shaped as Pikachu, Charizard, Squirtle, and Bulbasaur respectively)
- Toy Story (cheddar crackers in the shape of Woody and Buzz Lightyear)

=== Discontinued products ===
- PhysEdibles – prepared using whole-grains
- Puffs – launched in the United States in 2013
- Giant Sandwich Crackers
- Giant Goldfish
- Sandwich Snackers
- Garden Cheddar
- Mac & Cheese
- Cars 3 (red crackers in the shape of Lightning McQueen)
- Flavor Blasted Grahams
- Cinabuddy Snack Bites
- Cookies and Cream
- Princess (colored pink, same flavor as the original cheddar variety).
- Hello Kitty (strawberry shortcake flavored graham crackers in the shape of Hello Kitty, released for Hello Kitty's 50th anniversary)

== International distribution ==
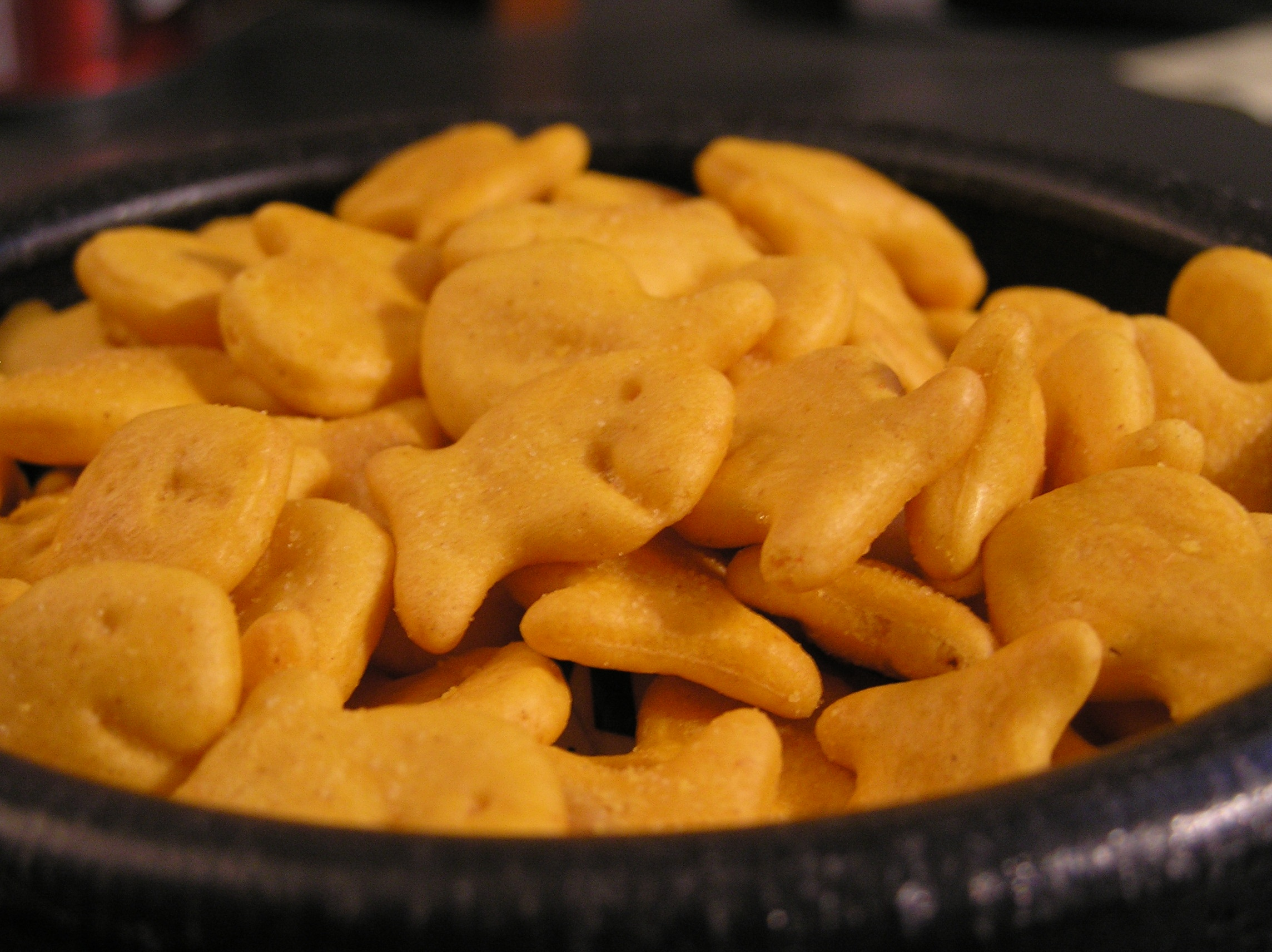
Goldfish crackers in a bowl

Goldfish are exported and sold in countries around the world. In the UK, they are sold under the name "Finz", but the product is identical. In Switzerland, the original Goldfish flavor is marketed under the brand name Goldfischli.

Goldfish was also sold under Arnott's branding in Australia.

== Spin-offs ==
Pepperidge Farm has created several spin-off products, including Goldfish Sandwich Crackers, Flavor-Blasted Goldfish, Goldfish bread, multi-colored Goldfish (known as Goldfish-American), and Baby Goldfish (which are smaller than normal). There are also seasonably available color-changing Goldfish and colored Goldfish (come in a variety pack). There was once a line of Goldfish cookies in vanilla and chocolate; chocolate has reappeared in the "100 calorie" packs.

== Legal issues ==
In 1999, Campbell Soup Co.'s Pepperidge Farm won a court case involving Nabisco's Cheese Nips CatDog crackers that had fish-shaped crackers that resembled Goldfish. The court ordered Nabisco to refrain from using the goldfish shape and to recall all their products that included the fish shape.

== Recalls ==
On July 23, 2018, Pepperidge Farm was notified by one of its ingredient suppliers that whey powder (in a seasoning applied to four varieties of Goldfish crackers) may have the presence of salmonella. The Flavored Blasted Xtra Cheddar crackers were recalled due to a possible risk of the salmonella outbreak. Three other Goldfish varieties (Flavored Blast Sour Slammin' Cream and Onion, Whole Grain Xtra Cheddar, and Goldfish Mix Xtra Cheddar and Pretzel) were also recalled due to contamination of the salmonella bacterium caused by the same affected whey powder used in The Flavored Blasted Xtra Cheddar GoldFish crackers. The contaminated varieties of Goldfish were immediately removed from all stores where they were sold following the recall.

== In popular culture ==
Julia Child liked Goldfish crackers so much that on Thanksgiving, she often put out a bowl alongside her famous reverse martini.

In Season 1, Episode 9 of The West Wing, character Danny Concannon gives C. J. Cregg a pet goldfish after misunderstanding a comment about C.J.'s affinity for the crackers.

== See also ==
- Cheese cracker
- List of crackers
