= Cracker (food) =

Flat, dry baked cookie

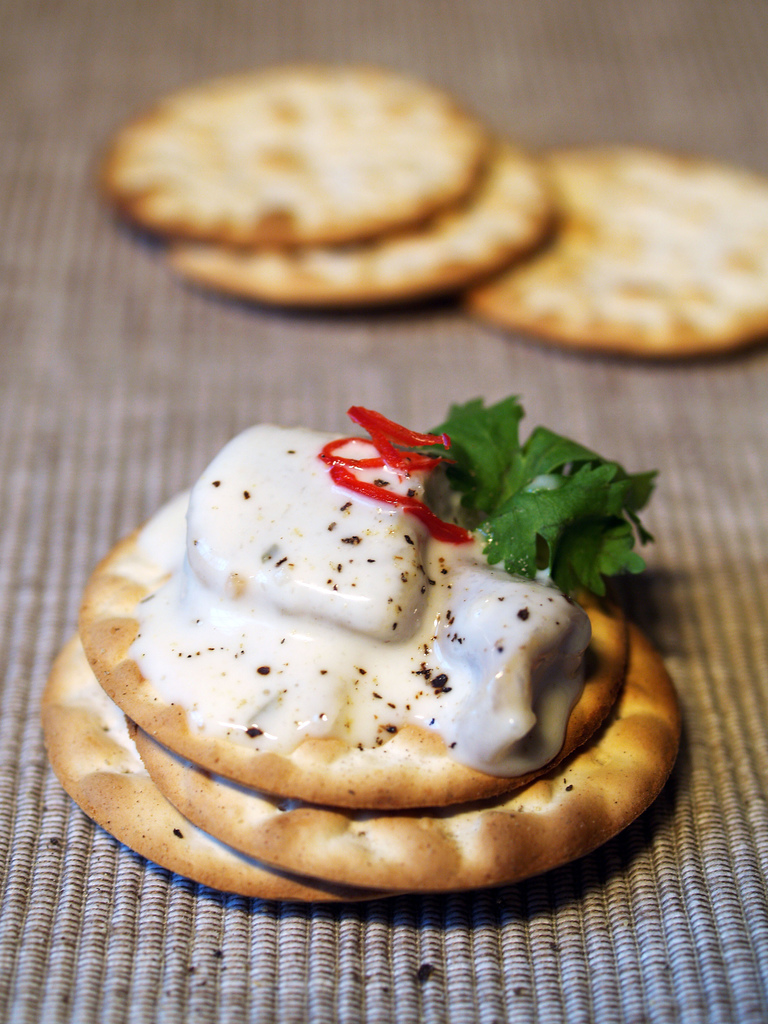
- Water biscuit crackers with herring and garlic sauce
- Created by: Unknown
- Main ingredients: Wheat flour, water
- Variations: Papadum, senbei and num kreab

A cracker is a flat, dry baked biscuit typically made with flour. Flavorings or seasonings, such as salt, herbs, seeds, or cheese, may be added to the dough or sprinkled on top before or after baking. Crackers are often branded as a nutritious and convenient way to consume a staple food or cereal grain.

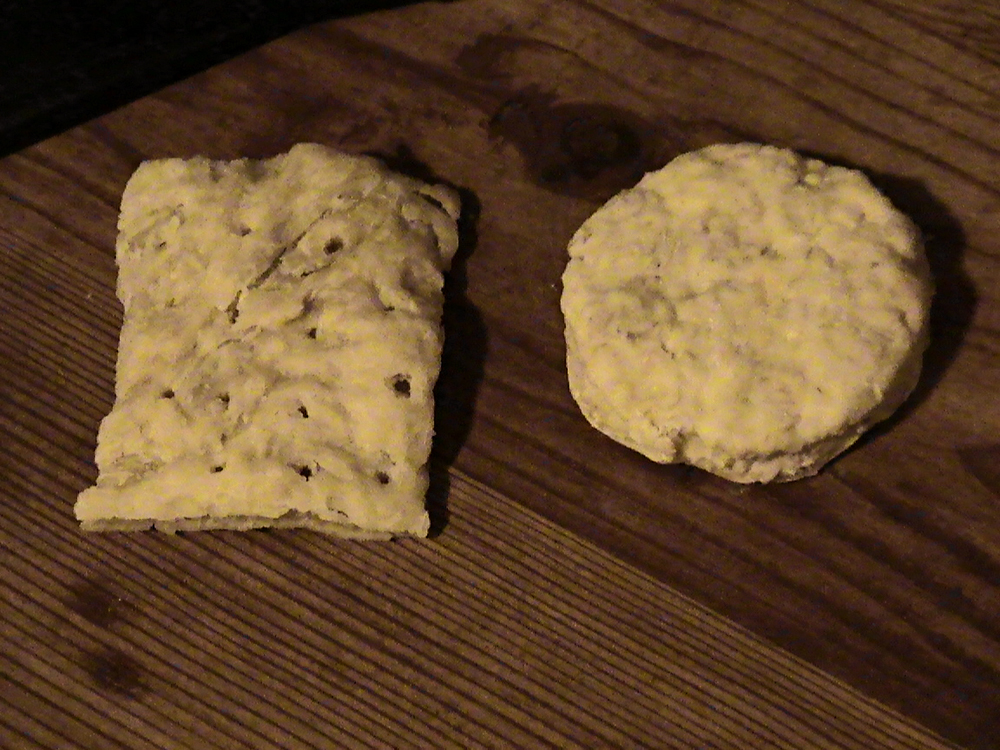
Reproduction of 19th-century hardtack, in the Army (square) and Navy (round) styles

Crackers can be eaten on their own, but can also accompany other food items such as cheese or meat slices, fruits, dips, or soft spreads such as jam, butter, peanut butter, or mousse. Bland or mild crackers are sometimes used as a palate cleanser in food product testing or flavor testing, between samples. Crackers may also be crumbled and added to soup. The modern cracker is somewhat similar to nautical ship's biscuits, military hardtack, chacknels, and sacramental bread. Other early versions of the cracker can be found in ancient flatbreads, such as lavash, pita, matzo, flatbrød, and crispbread. Asian analogues include papadum, senbei and num kreab.

The characteristic holes found in many crackers are called "docking" holes. The holes are poked in the dough to stop overly large air pockets from forming in the cracker while baking.

== History ==
Modern crackers are the end product of what started as a convenience food for soldiers and sailors, recorded as far back as 1190. Known as Hardtack or ship's biscuit, they were made out of a mixture of grain and/or legume flour and water, shaped into tablets, then baked until brick hard. The low moisture content allowed these tablets to be stored for long periods of time with no loss of nutritional value. Mixed with coffee, soup, or even sea water, the hard biscuits could be softened before consuming. They were an important part of a British sailor's diet until the introduction of canned food in the 1800s, although the product remained a staple for soldiers during the American Civil War. Not having ready access to wheat, Confederate soldiers made a similar item using ground corn, known as "corn dodgers" or "Johnny cakes".

In 1836, Jonathan Dodgson Carr, who owned a mill and bakery in Carlisle, England, began milling wheat for his Table Water biscuits. Made of flour and water, the recipe was derived directly from hard tack, but rolled much thinner. As a thin, crisp cracker, water biscuits were more palatable than hard tack but still suitable for long-term storage by sailors and travelers.

== Types ==
There are two major types of crackers: soda (or saltine), which are fermented and leavened with yeast; and snack crackers, which are, in most cases, chemically-leavened. Soda crackers normally do not contain added sugar and the fat or shortening level is quite low. Another type of cracker uses no leavening; examples are matzah, water crackers (also known as water biscuits), and Triscuits.

Crackers come in many shapes and sizes, such as round, rectangular, triangular, or irregular. Crackers sometimes have cheese or spices as ingredients, or even chicken stock. Saltines and oyster crackers are often used in or served with soup. Cheese crackers are prepared using cheese as a main ingredient; commercial examples include Cheez-It, Cheese Nips, and Goldfish.

Graham crackers and digestive biscuits are treated more like cookies than crackers. Although they were both invented for their supposed health benefits, modern versions of both are sweet. Similarly, animal crackers are crackers in name only. Animal crackers and graham crackers may have docking holes.

== Brands ==
Cracker brands include Bremner Wafers, Captain's Wafers, Cheese Nips, Club Crackers, Goldfish crackers, In a Biskit, Jacob's, Ritz Crackers, Town House crackers, Triscuit, TUC, and Wheat Thins.

== Gallery ==
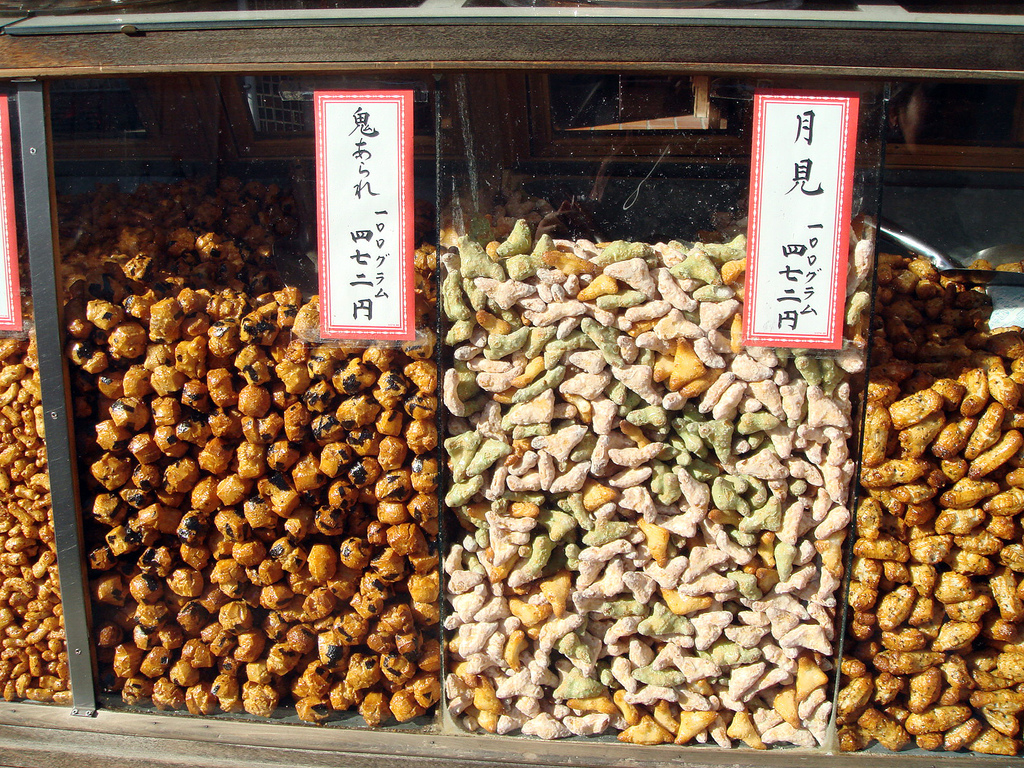
Arare, small Japanese rice crackers

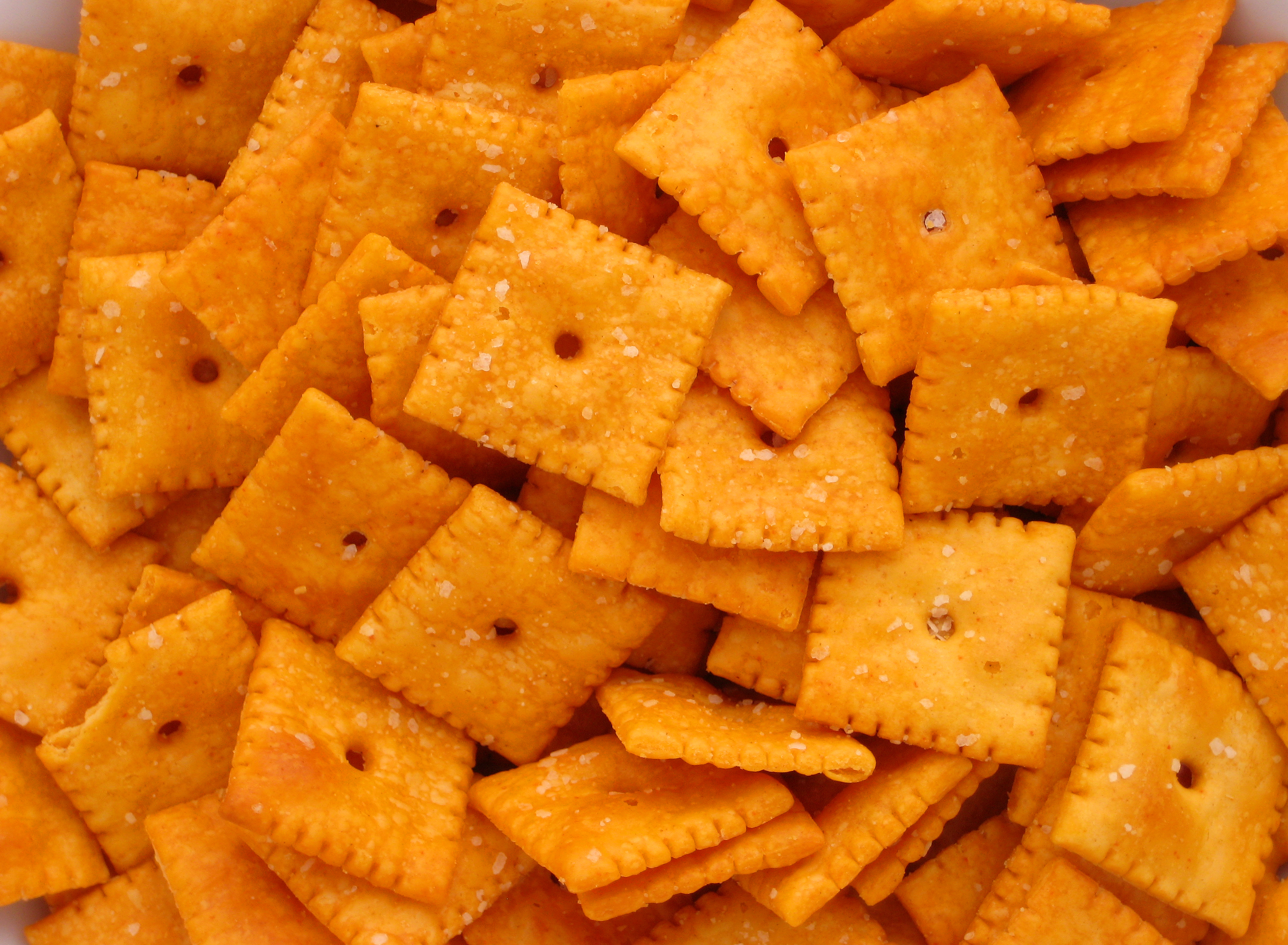
Cheez-It crackers made by Kellogg

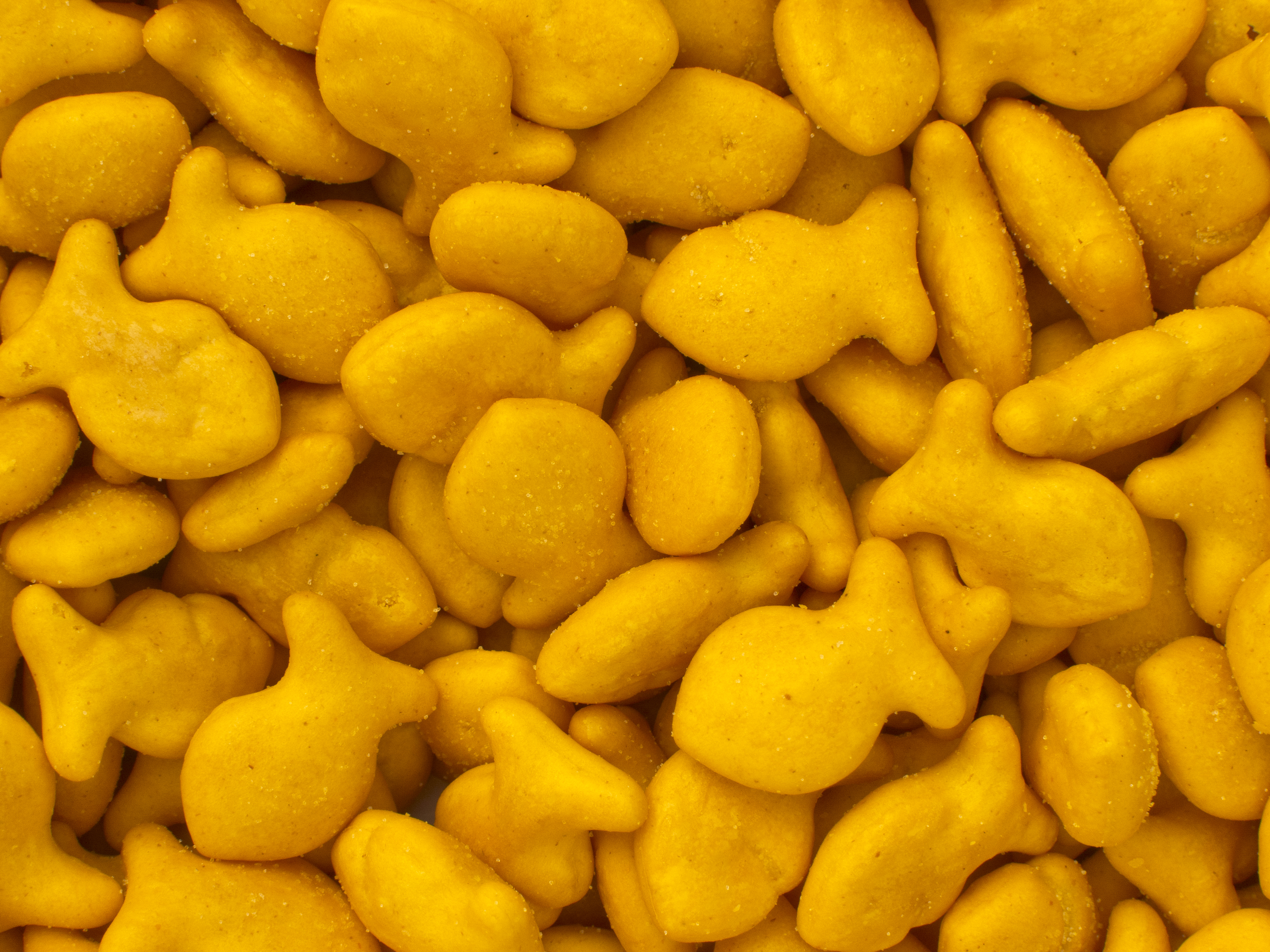
Cheddar cheese flavored Goldfish crackers

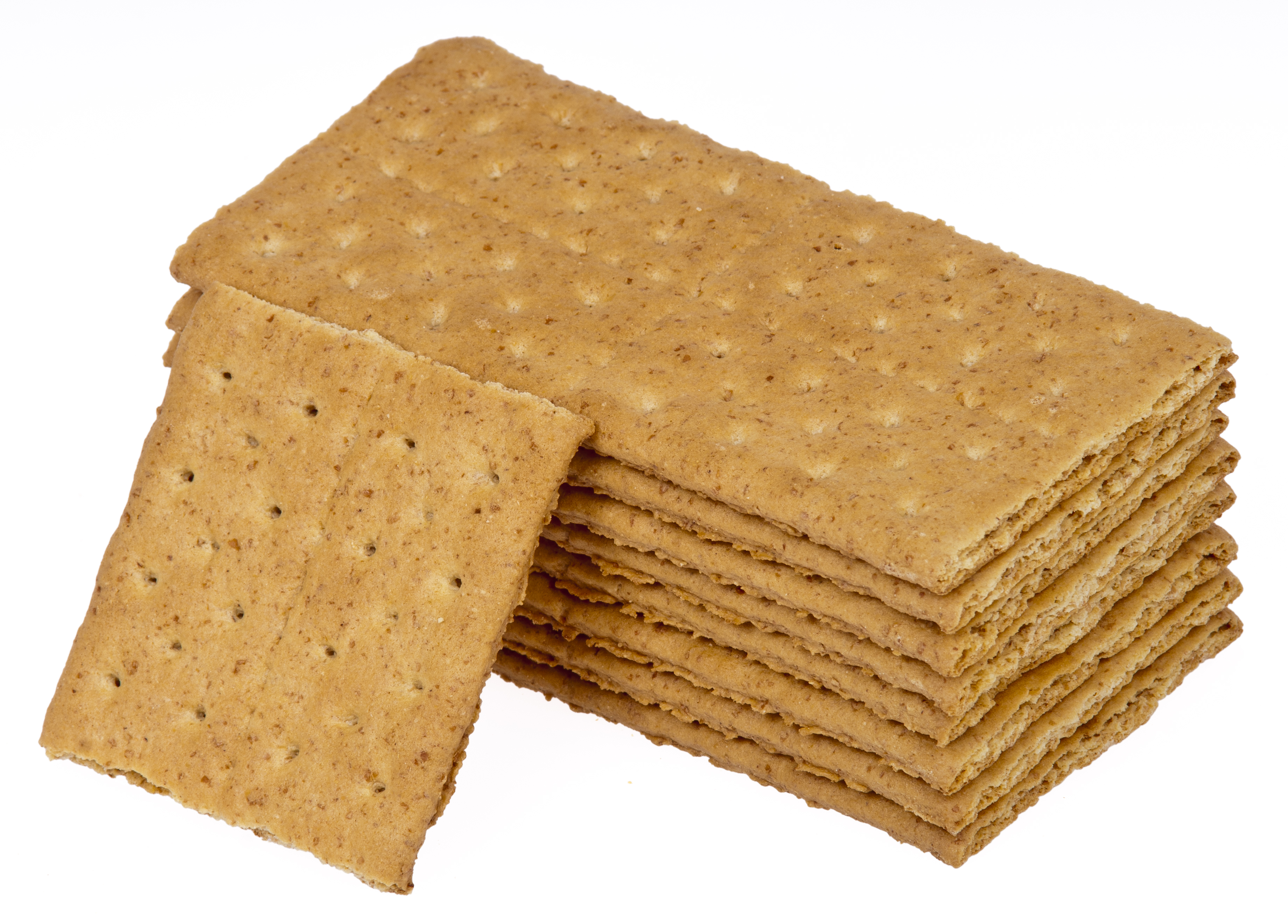
Graham crackers which are lightly sweet rather than savory

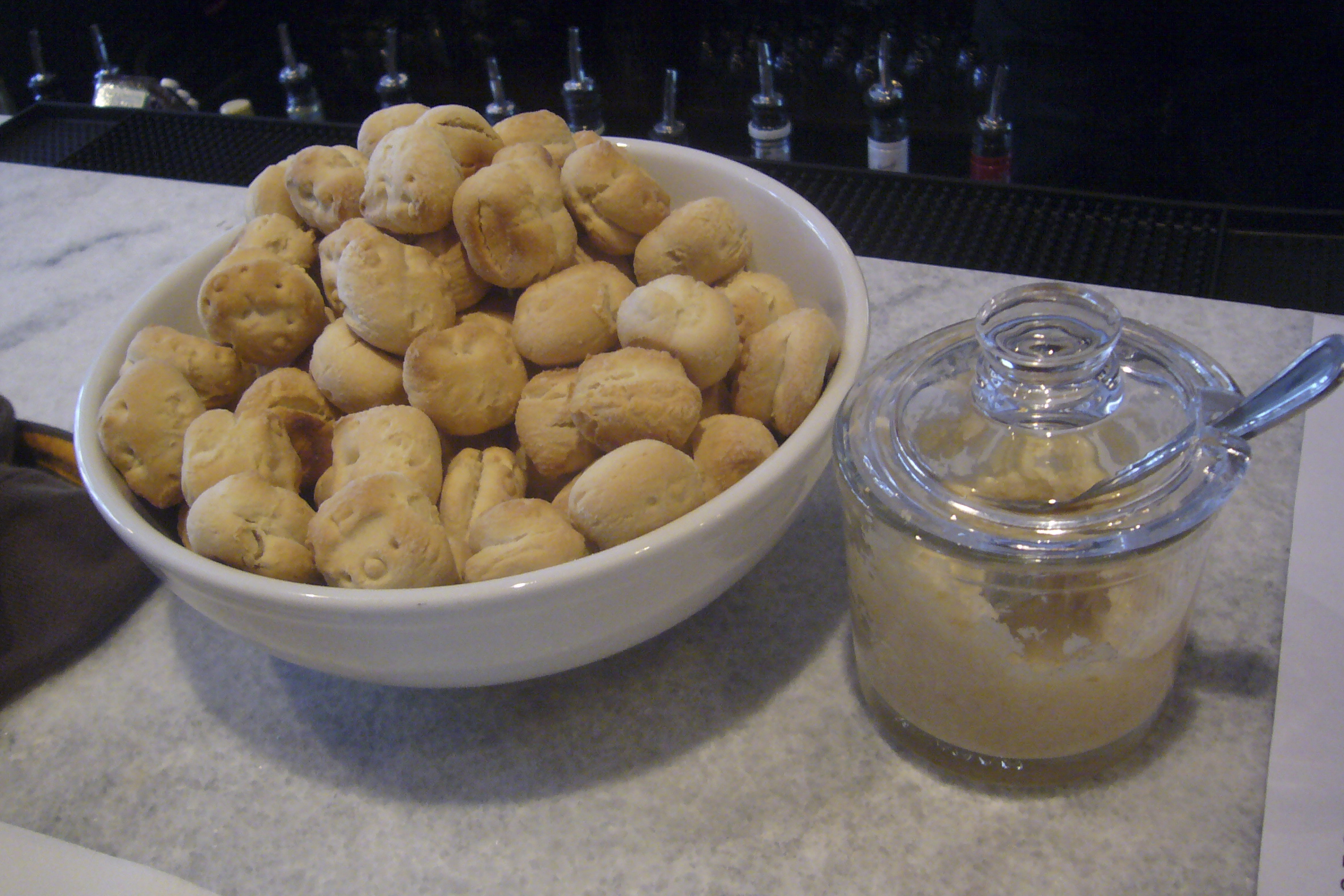
A bowl of oyster crackers

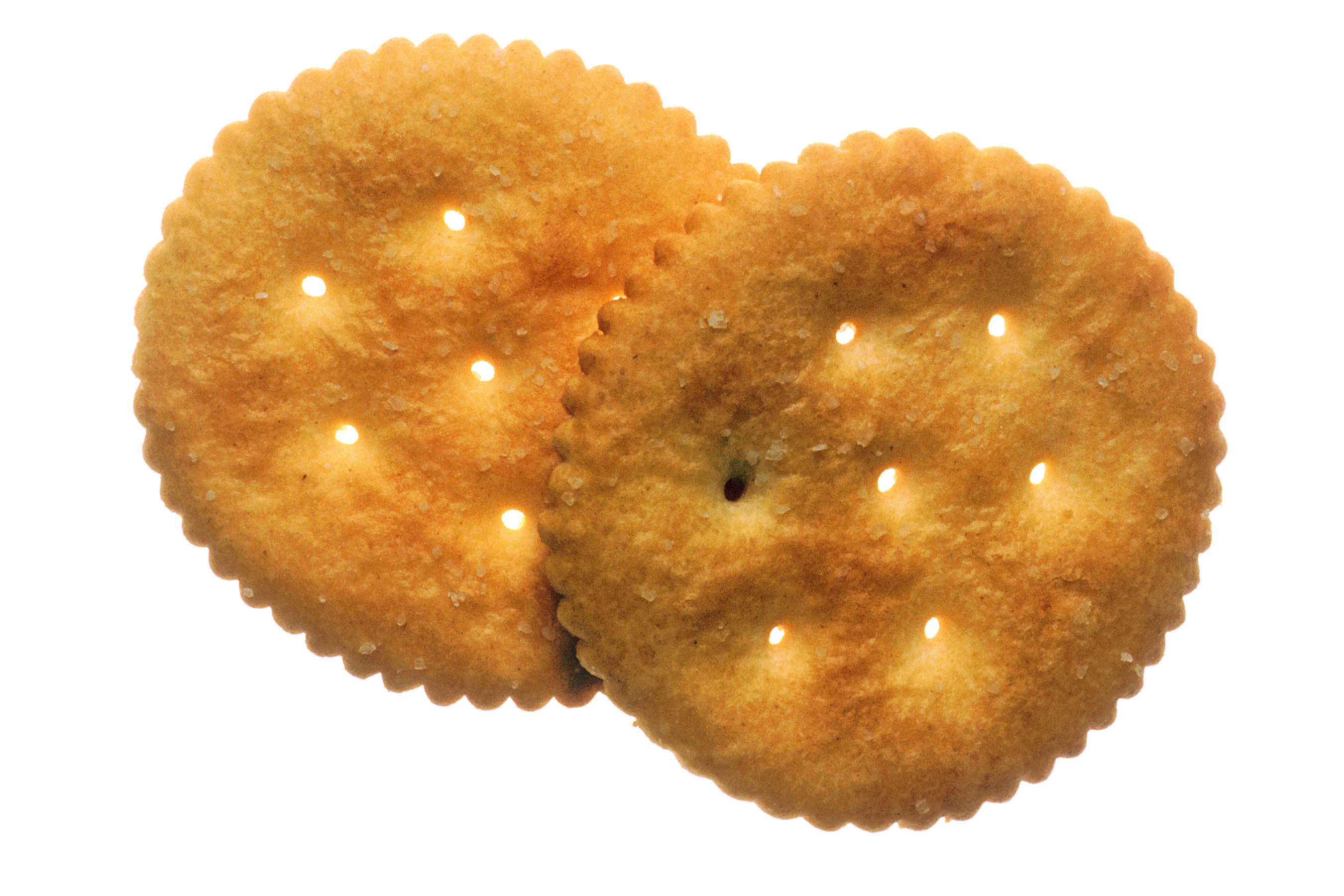
Ritz Crackers

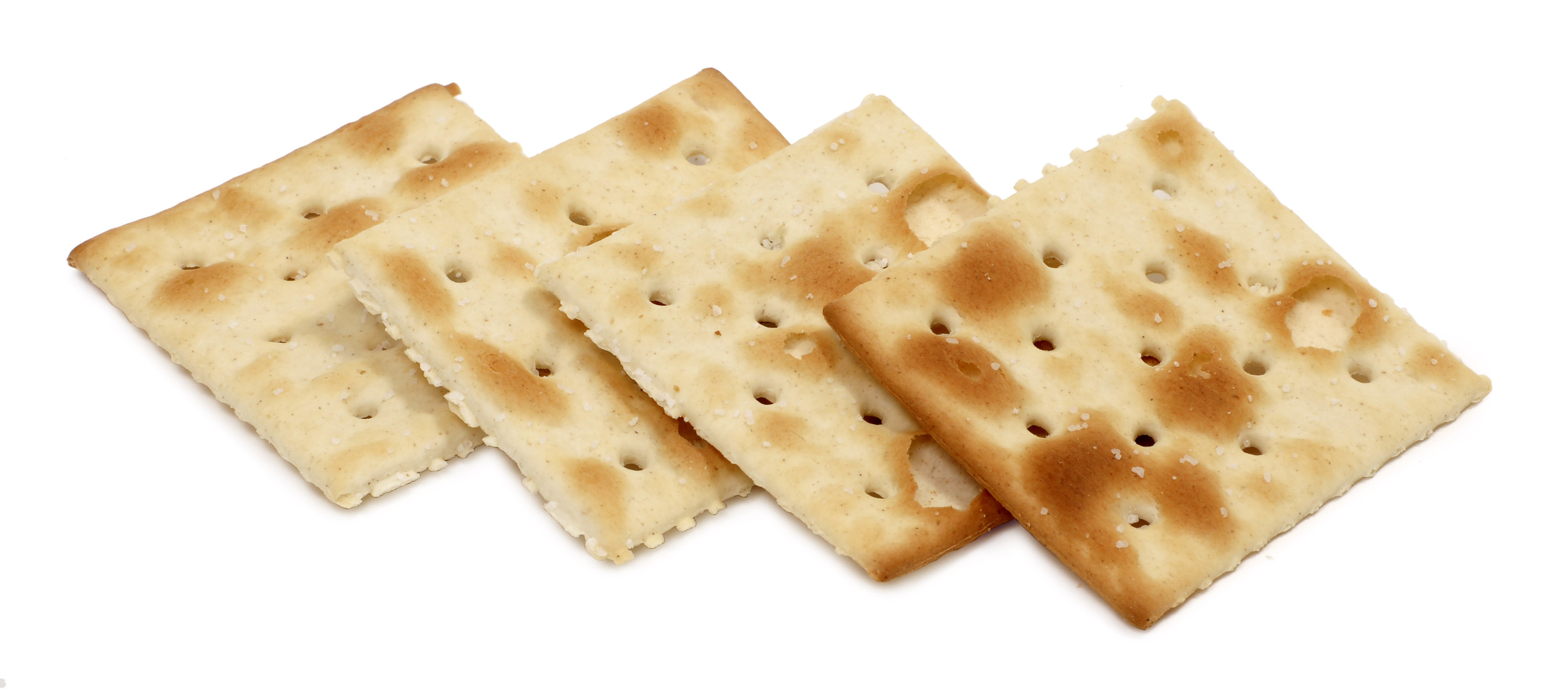
Saltine crackers

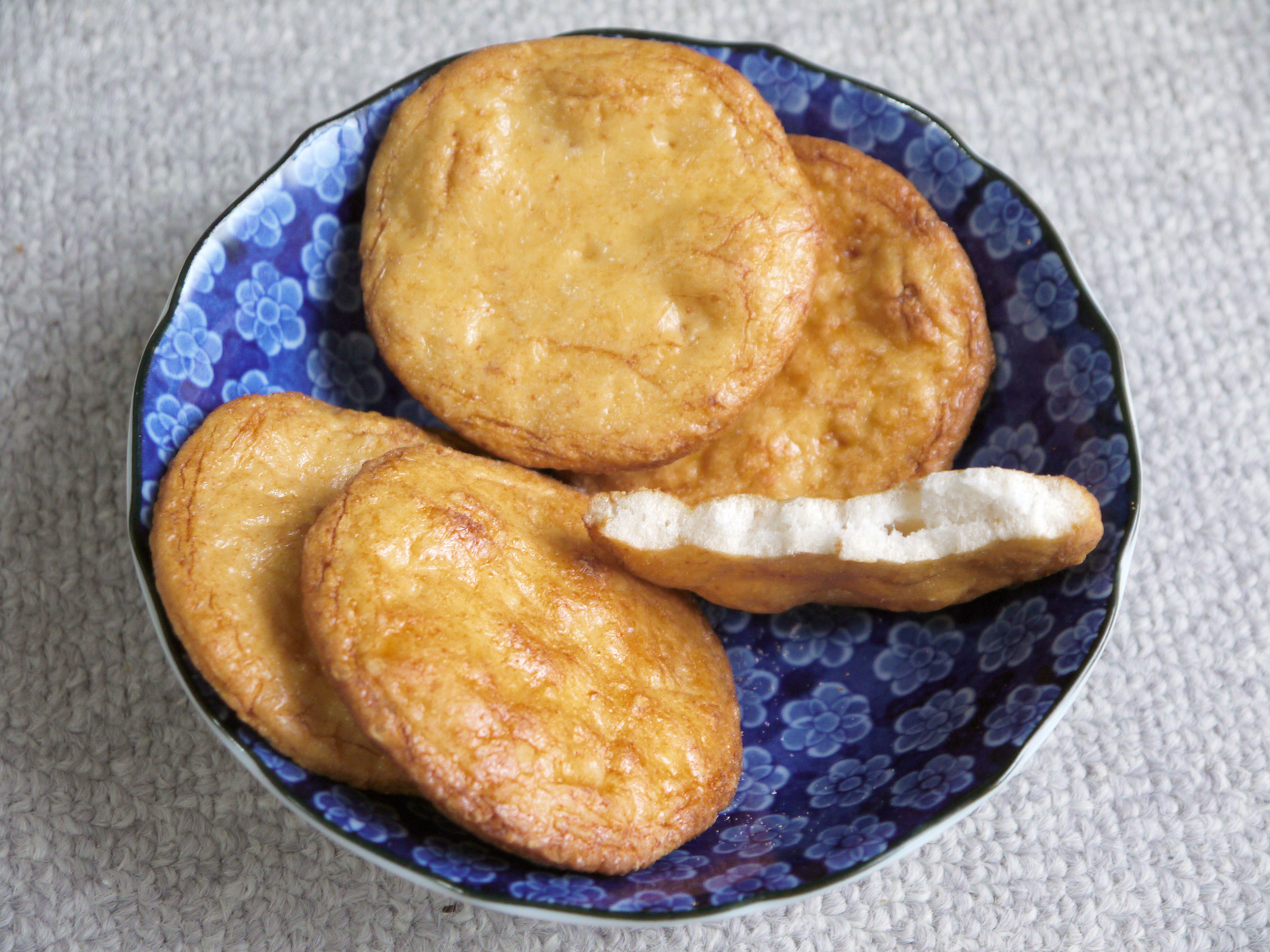
Japanese Senbei rice cracker

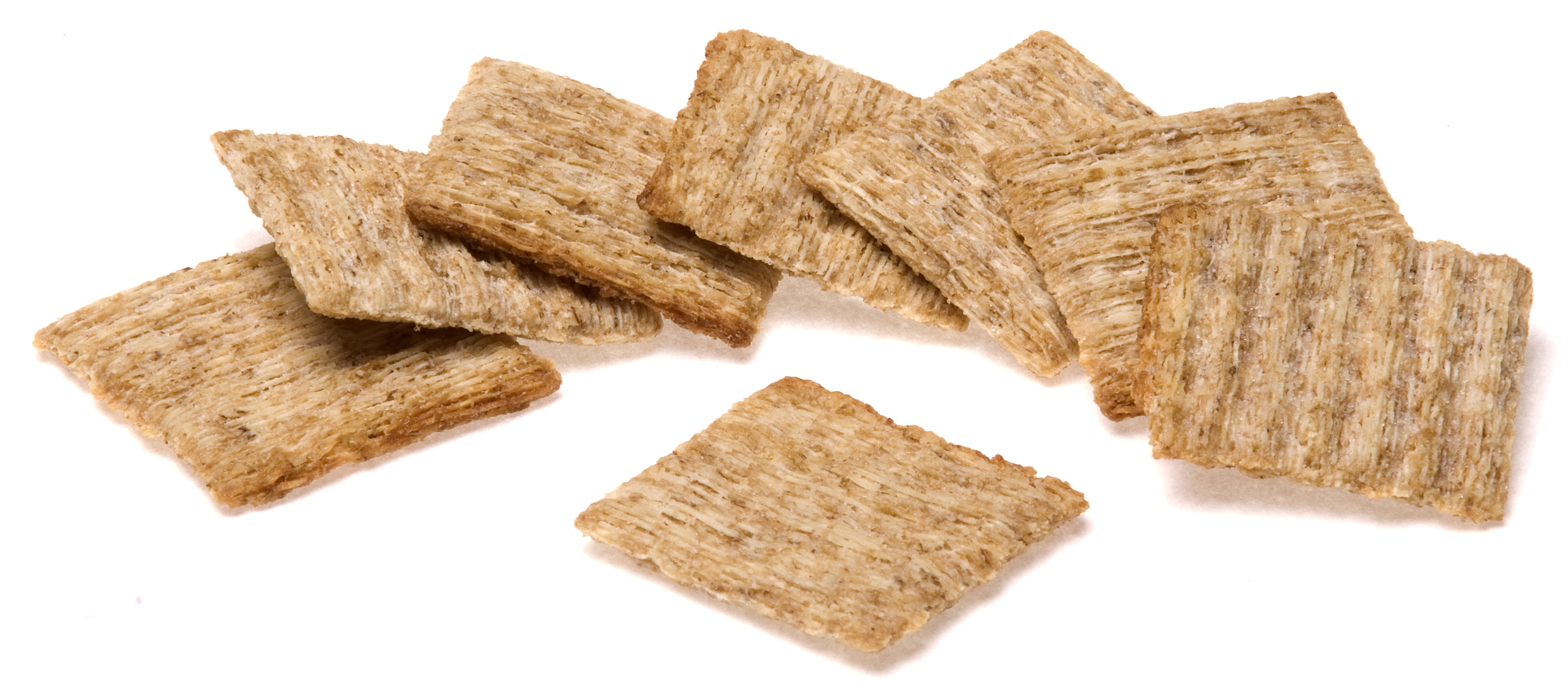
Triscuit shredded wheat crackers

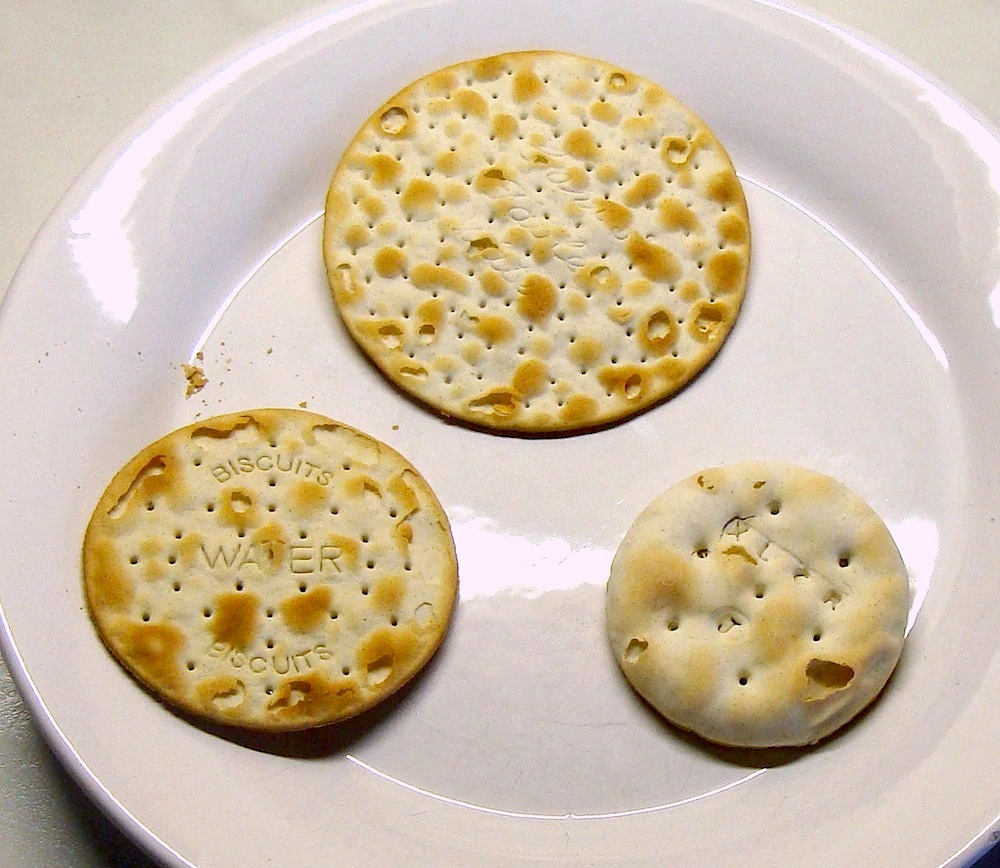
Trio of Water biscuits: Left: Supermarket own brand, Right: Excelsior from Jamaica, Top: Carr's Table Cracker

== See also ==
- Cheese and crackers
- Kerupuk
- List of crackers
- Matzo
- Pretzel
- Saltine cracker challenge
- Tortilla
