= Strathdon Blue =

Scottish blue cheese

- Country of origin: Scotland
- Region: Ross-shire
- Town: Tain
- Source of milk: Cows
- Pasteurised: Yes
- Texture: Creamy, semi-soft

Strathdon Blue is a creamy full-fat blue cheese made in Tain in Scotland.

== Production ==
While previously produced by another company, Strathdon Blue has been produced at Blarliath Farm since the 1990s by the Highland Fine Cheeses company run by the Stone family of Tain, from herds of Ayrshire and Friesian cattle from Caithness. It is influenced by Bleu d'Auvergne.

== History ==
Strathdon Blue won a gold medal at the British Cheese Awards in 2007.

In 2021, Mini Cheddars released a limited edition Strathdon Blue flavour.

== Description ==
Strathdon is made from pasteurised milk and vegetarian rennet. It is said to have a tangy flavour.
