= Cheez-It =

Baked cheese crackers

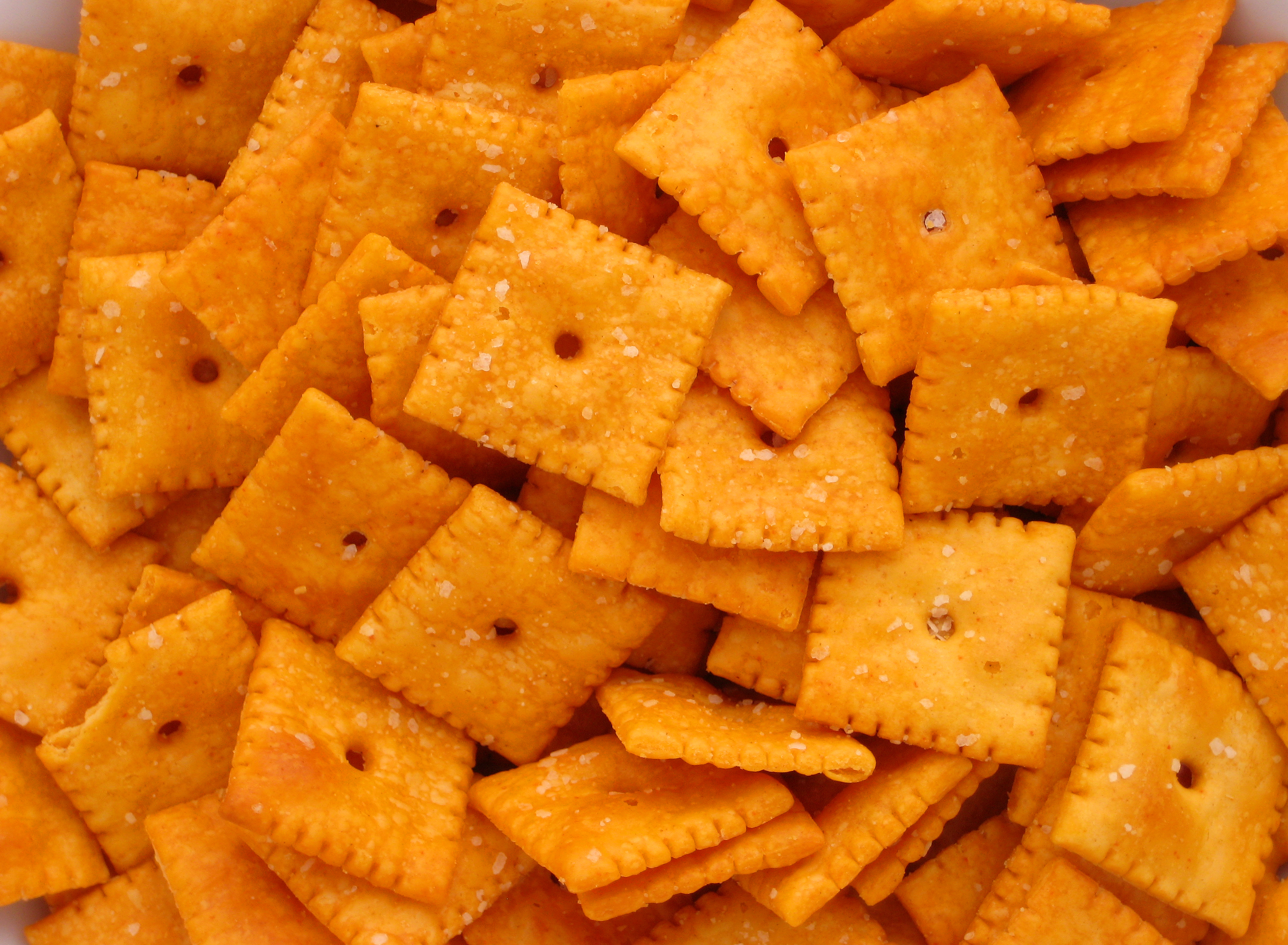
- Product type: Cracker
- Current owner: Mars Inc.
- Produced by: Kellanova (via Sunshine Biscuits)
- Introduced: March 31, 1921; 105 years ago
- Previous owners: Green & Green Company (1921–1932); Sunshine Biscuits (1932–1996); Keebler Company (1996–2001)
- Website: cheezit.com

Cheez-It is a brand of cheese crackers manufactured by Kellanova through its Sunshine Biscuits division. Approximately 26 by 24 mm (1.0 by 0.94 in), the rectangular crackers are made with wheat flour, vegetable oil, cheese, skim milk, salt, and spices.

== History ==
In 1907 Weston Green founded the Green & Green Company in Dayton, Ohio. Green's company produced a variety of baked snack foods such as Dayton crackers, graham crackers, gingersnaps, and, during World War I, hardtack. On March 31, 1921, Green introduced Cheez-It crackers, commonly called Cheez-Its, as a new product. The company marketed the cracker as a "baked rarebit", a reference to a dish of melted cheese over toast. On May 23, 1921, the first Cheez-It logo was submitted to the United States Patent and Trademark Office.

In the early 1930s, the Kansas City-based Sunshine Biscuits (which was known as the Loose-Wiles Biscuit Company until 1947) acquired the Green & Green Company, and with it came the Cheez-It cracker. Sunshine Biscuits expanded the distribution and popularity of Cheez-It crackers across the country. In 1996, Keebler acquired Sunshine Biscuits, and in 2001, Kellogg's acquired Keebler, bringing Cheez-It crackers under its umbrella. In late 2023, Kellogg's spun off its North American cereal division as WK Kellogg Co. The company's snack food business, including Cheez-It, became part of the renamed Kellanova. On August 14, 2024, Kellanova announced Mars Inc., has entered into an agreement to acquire the Kellanova brand. The deal closed in late 2025.

Cheez-Its were officially launched in Canada in January 2020, as well as Australia in April 2024. Ireland and the United Kingdom followed in September 2024.

== Cracker ==
Cheez-It crackers are 26-by-24-millimeter (1.0 by 0.94 in) rectangles, though they are often mistaken to be square shaped. Cheez-It crackers are made with actual cheese, and are marketed as such. Cheez-It crackers were first sold in green and white packaging. The brand introduced red into its logo during the 1930s, following the familiar red, yellow and orange colors in the 1940s. The crackers were developed to resemble a welsh rarebit, a dish made with cheese sauce served over toast, cheez-it didn't mean anything at the time initially labeled as “baked rarebit”.

== Varieties ==
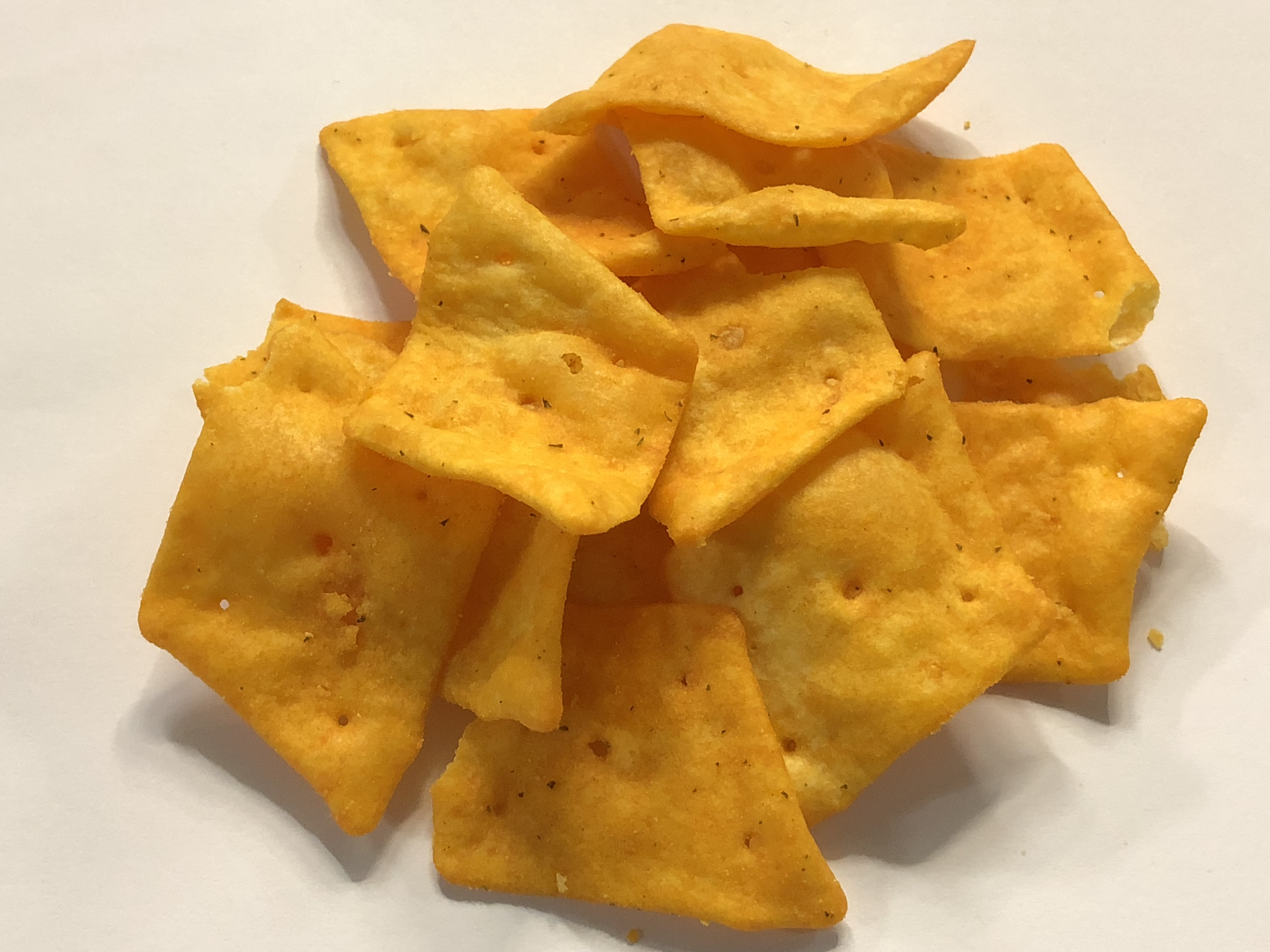
Cheddar Sour Cream and Onion Cheez-It Snap'd

The original Cheez-It was the only product available until the mid 1980s; since then, 50 different varieties of Cheez-It crackers and other products have been marketed including:

- Black Pepper Cheddar
- Buffalo Wing
- Cheddar Jack
- Cheesy Taco
- Crunch Zesty Jalapeno Cheddar
- Crunch Sharp White Cheddar
- Duoz Sharp Cheddar & Parmesan
- Duoz Bacon & Cheddar
- Duoz Jalapeño & Cheddar Jack
- Duoz Pesto and Mozzarella
- Extra Toasty
- Extra Toasty Cheddar Jack
- Extra Big
- Extra Cheesy
- Extra Crunchy Bold Cheddar
- French Onion Dip
- Gluten-free
- Gripz (As of 2026)
- Grooves Bold Cheddar
- Grooves Loaded Nacho
- Grooves Sharp White Cheddar
- Grooves Zesty Cheddar Ranch
- Hot & Spicy (without Tabasco sauce)
- Italian Four Cheese
- Original
- Pepper Jack
- Puff'd Double Cheese
- Puff'd White Cheddar
- Puff'd Cheddar Jack
- Puff'd Cheese Pizza
- Reduced Fat Original
- Smoked Cheddar
- Smoked Gouda
- Snack Mix Original
- Snack Mix Double Cheese
- Snap'd Cheddar Sour Cream & Onion
- Snap'd Double Cheese
- Snap'd Extra Crunchy Margherita Pizza
- Snap'd Extra Crunchy Sharp White Cheddar
- Snap'd Honey Barbecue
- Snap'd Sour Cream & Onion
- White Cheddar
- Whole Grain

=== Discontinued ===
Currently discontinued or limited time Cheez-It varieties include:

- Asiago
- Atomic Cheddar
- Baby Swiss
- Barbecue & Cheddar Snack Mix
- Cheez It Big (replaced by the "Extra Big" variety)
- Chili Cheese
- Chipotle Cheddar
- Colby
- Cheese Pizza
- Duoz Smoked Cheddar and Monterey Jack
- Duoz Zesty Queso and Cheddar Blanco
- Grooves Scorchin' Hot Cheddar
- Hidden Valley Ranch (limited time offering)
- Hot & Spicy (with Tabasco sauce)
- Hot & Spicy Grooves
- Mozzarella
- Nacho
- Parmesan & Garlic
- Provolone
- Romano
- Cheez It Scrabble Junior
- Snack Mix Sriracha
- Snack Mix Sweet and Salty
- Snap'd Barbecue (replaced by the "Honey Barbecue" variety)
- Snap'd Jalapeno Jack
- Snap'd Parmesan Ranch
- Twists Buffalo Bleu
- Wendy's Baconator (limited time offering)
- Zingz Chipotle Cheddar
- Zingz Queso Fundido

== See also ==
- Cheese Nips, a former competing brand of cheese cracker
- Cheez-It Bowl (2018–2019), sponsored by Cheez-It and played in Arizona in 2018 and 2019
- Cheez-It Bowl (2020–2022), sponsored by Cheez-It and played in Florida from 2020 through 2022
- Citrus Bowl, played in Florida and sponsored by Cheez-It starting with the January 2023 edition
