= Cheese and crackers =

Dish, often served with wine, fruit, or meat

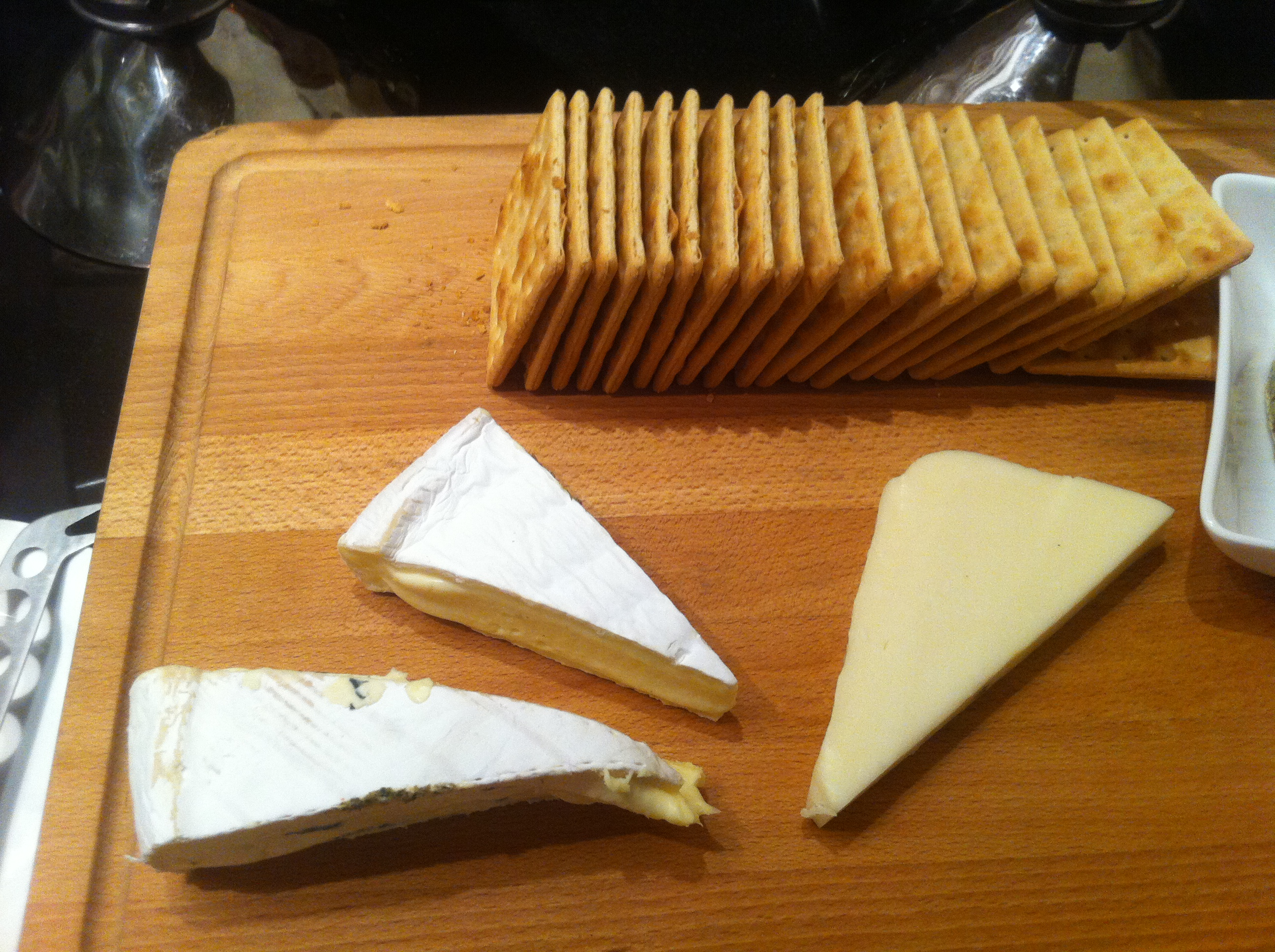
- Brie paired with crackers
- Course: Snack, hors d'oeuvre
- Main ingredients: Cheese, crackers

Cheese and crackers, also known as cheese and biscuits in the UK, is the pairing of crackers with cheese. Historically the fare of sailors, soldiers, and pioneers, cheese and crackers had become a common menu item in American restaurants and bars by the 1850s. Many different types of cheeses and crackers are used and the food is often paired with wine. Cheese and crackers may also be served with fruit preparations or preserves, pickles, stuffed olives and preserved meats, such as salami, pepperoni or various sausages. Mass-produced cheese and crackers include Ritz, Jatz, and Lunchables.

== Overview ==
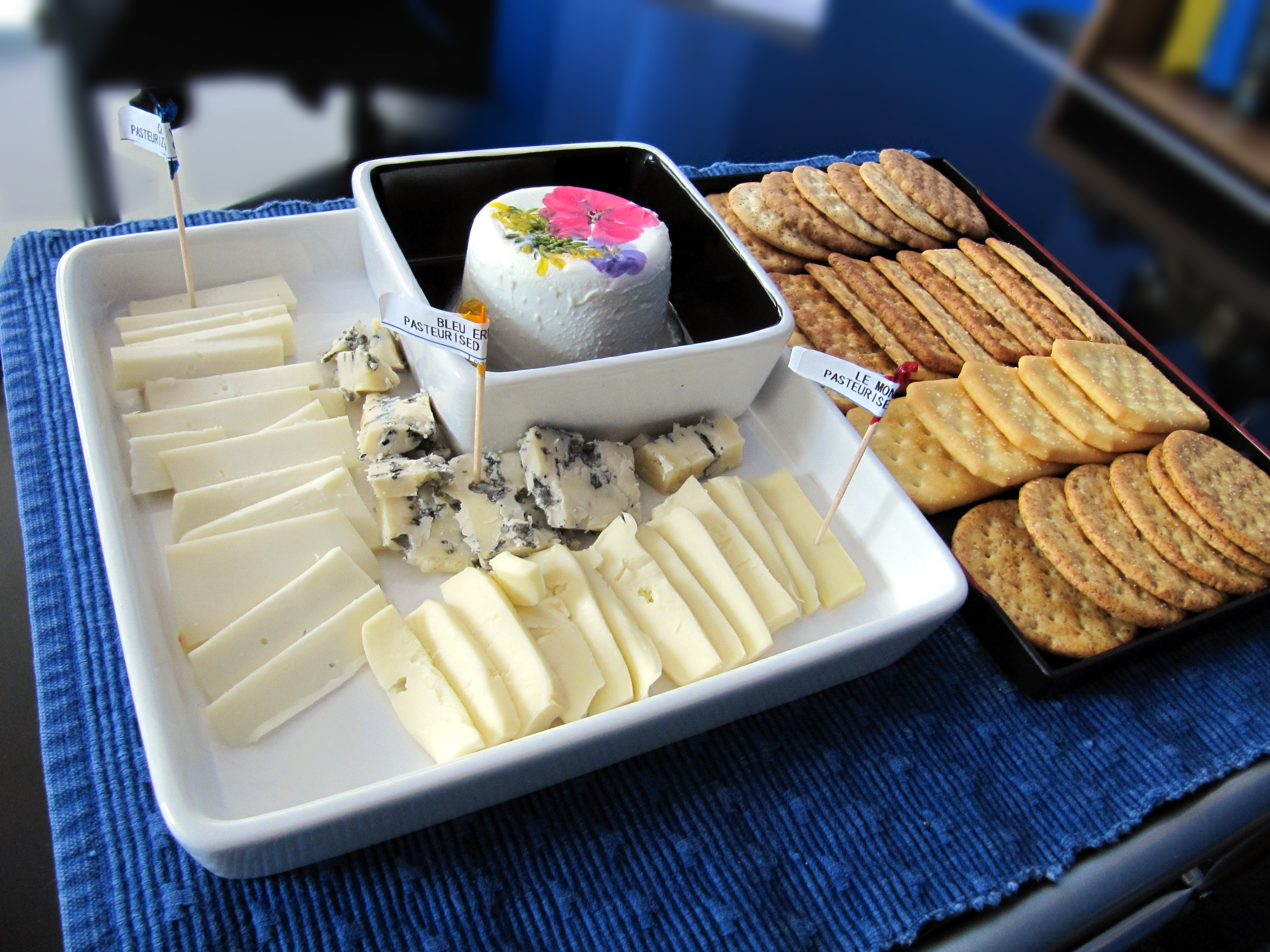
A selection of cheeses and crackers

Cheese and crackers is a common snack food or hors d'oeuvre consisting of crackers paired with various cheeses. In the United States it has also been served as a dessert, with the addition of ingredients such as jam, jelly, marmalade or preserves. It is also commonly served at parties in the U.S., and in the Southern United States, it is relatively common for hot chili pepper jelly to be served atop cream cheese and crackers at cocktail parties. Cheese and crackers has a relatively high amount of protein, per the cheese as an ingredient.

Cheese and crackers is a common food pairing that can serve to complement various cheeses, and the dish can be paired with wines. The cheese can be sliced or cubed, and served separately with crackers or pre-placed atop the crackers.

== History ==
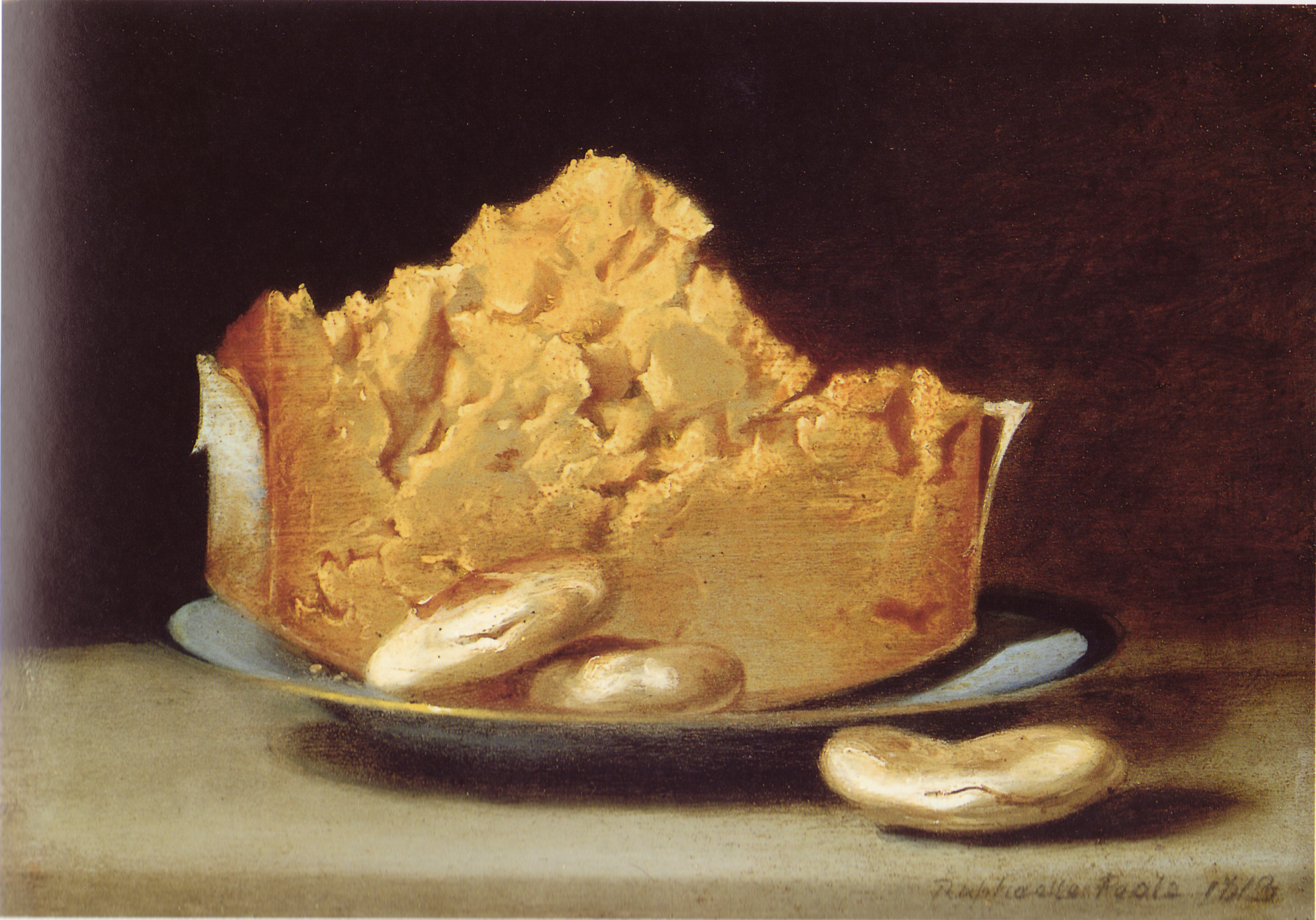
Cheese with Three Crackers, a painting by Raphaelle Peale, 1813

Cheese and crackers has been consumed by various sailors such as immigrants, whalers and explorers before refrigeration existed, using hardtack crackers and cheese. It has also been consumed by various land explorers.

=== United States ===
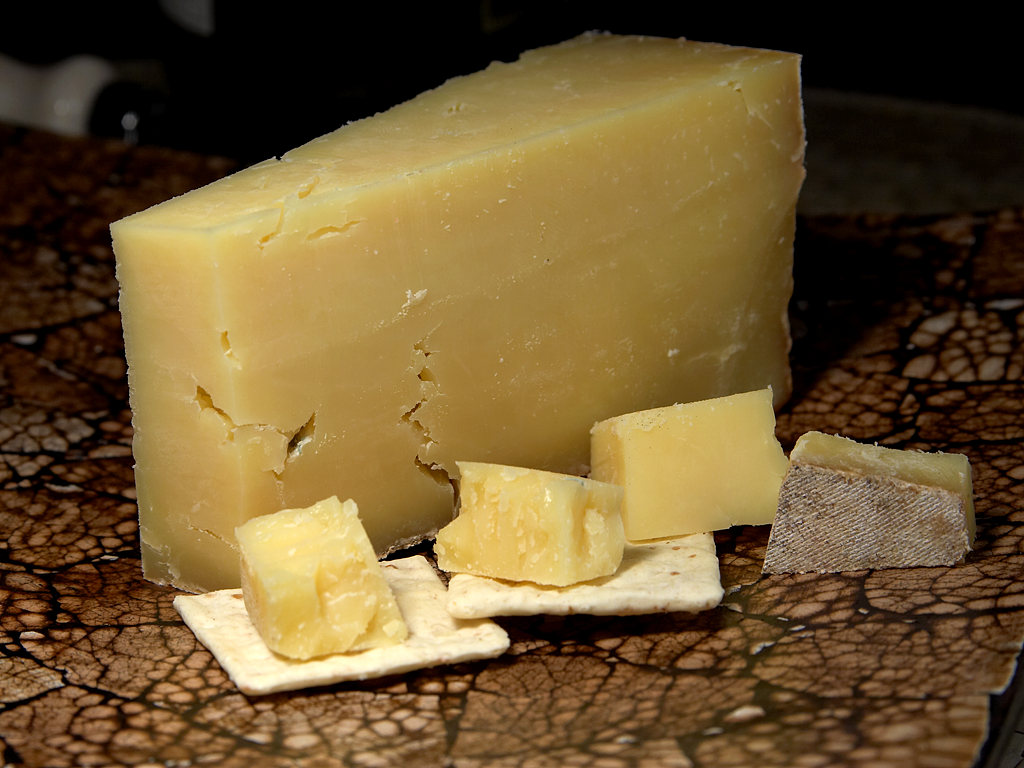
Cheese and crackers with cubed cheddar cheese

Cheese and crackers increased in popularity circa the 1850s, when bakers began producing thinner crackers with a lighter texture compared to hard tack. During this time period, the combination was placed on restaurant menus as an after-dessert course and was also served in saloons. Cheese and crackers was a food ration used by soldiers during the American Civil War (1861–1865). Some soldiers at the time referred to cheese and crackers as a "square meal". Cheese and hardtack was consumed along with dried venison meat by Ezra Meeker during his time on the Oregon Trail in 1852. In 1915, mountaineer Philip Rogers consumed cheese and hardtack along with raisins and nuts during his expedition around Mount Rainier in Washington state.

By the beginning of the 20th century, cheese and crackers was being prepared in homes and cooked by baking it and adding additional ingredients after cooking, such as paprika and mustard. At this time, the combination was sometimes served with soups and salads, and was used on salads for decades thereafter. It was also commonly served at parties beginning around this time. It was consumed as a dessert, rather than after-dessert by some during the Great Depression in the United States, and was often consumed by President Franklin D. Roosevelt and Eleanor Roosevelt in the White House for dessert and snacks, along with other foods.

Beginning in the 1950s, cheese and crackers was recommended as a snack for children by parenting experts, home economists and authors of cookbooks. Consumption of the snack increased during the mid-1980s when Oscar Mayer introduced its Lunchables product, which included cheese, crackers and lunch meat, and occurred in part to boost the company's lunch meat sales.

== Mass production ==
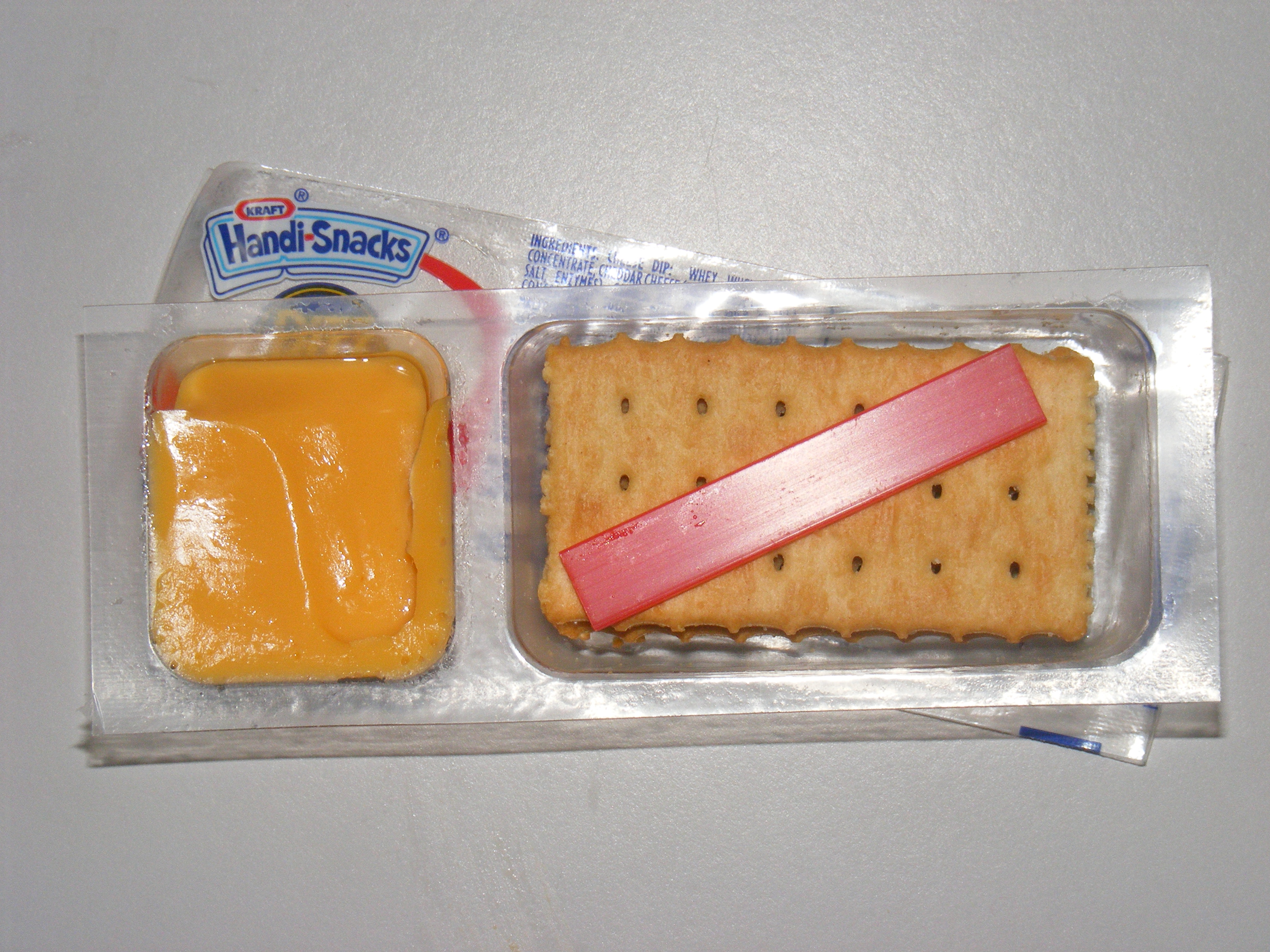
A Kraft Handi-Snack

- Handi-Snacks are a mass-produced cheese and crackers snack food made by Kraft Foods, prepared using processed cheese.
- "Fancy cheese and crackers" was a cheese and crackers lunch product purveyed by Oscar Mayer in the mid-1980s that included additional foods such as lunch meat and a dessert.
- Lunchables is another Kraft brand launched in 1988 that includes cheese and crackers as ingredients in some of its products.
- Lunchly is a 2024 product similar to Lunchables.

== In language ==
The term "cheese and crackers" was used as a minced oath in the United States in the 1920s (from "Jesus Christ!"), and as a slang term for testicles in the United Kingdom circa the late 1990s. It was the catchphrase of the burlesque comic Billy Hagan.

== See also ==
- Bagel and cream cheese
- Cheese cracker
- List of cheese dishes
- List of hors d'oeuvre
