= Num kreab =

Cambodian bread or sandwich

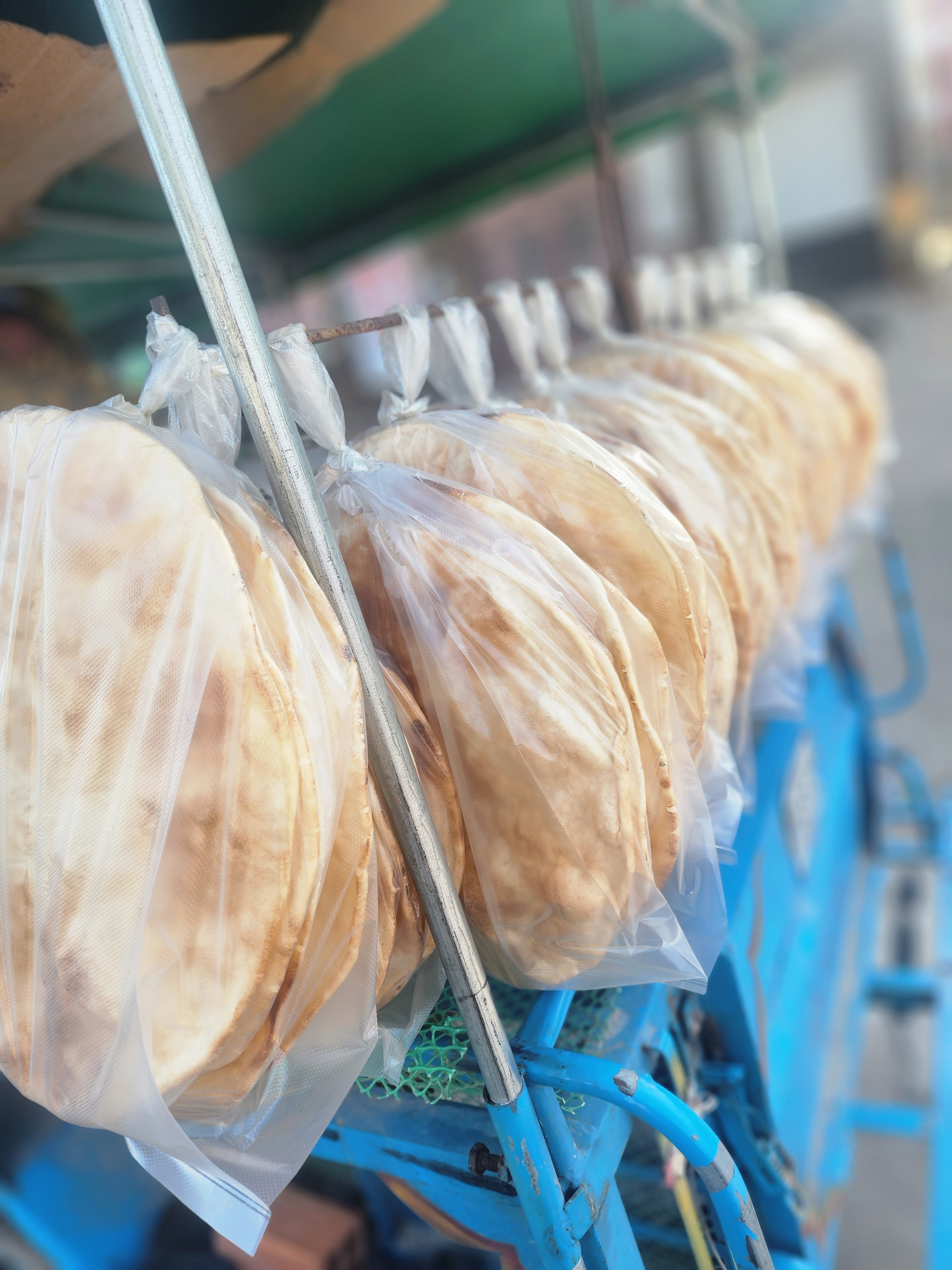
- Num kreab wrapped up for sale
- Alternative names: nom kreab, nom krieb, Cambodian rice cracker, Cambodian rice pancake
- Type: Rice cracker
- Place of origin: Cambodia
- Main ingredients: Rice flour, palm sugar, lard
- Similar dishes: Senbei

Num kreab (Khmer: នំក្រៀប) is a Khmer thin, round and flat rice cracker that is sold as street food in Cambodia.

== History ==
Unlike num ansorm, which is made for Cambodian New Year, num krieb is not prepared for any specific occasions. Num krieb is frequently made from leftover rice, often by poor farmers who sell it to earn extra income.

Similar to other round rice crackers across Asia, num krieb has the same recipe as the smaller Japanese senbei but is the size of the Indian flatbread bhatura. It is difficult to presume of num krieb's antiquity, though local traditions consider it to be from time immemorial.

== Preparation ==
Nom kreab being grilled in Sihanoukville, using traditional bamboo claws.

The num kreab is made from various ingredients including rice, palm sugar, lard, and duck eggs or chicken eggs. The rice is rinsed and soaked in water, then drained and steamed. After that, it is mixed with palm sugar and pressed into small balls. The balls are flattened with a piece of wood or a short round tube and dried in the sun for about 1 to 2 hours before being stored in a basket or pan for grilling.
