= Cheddars =

Cheese-flavoured biscuits

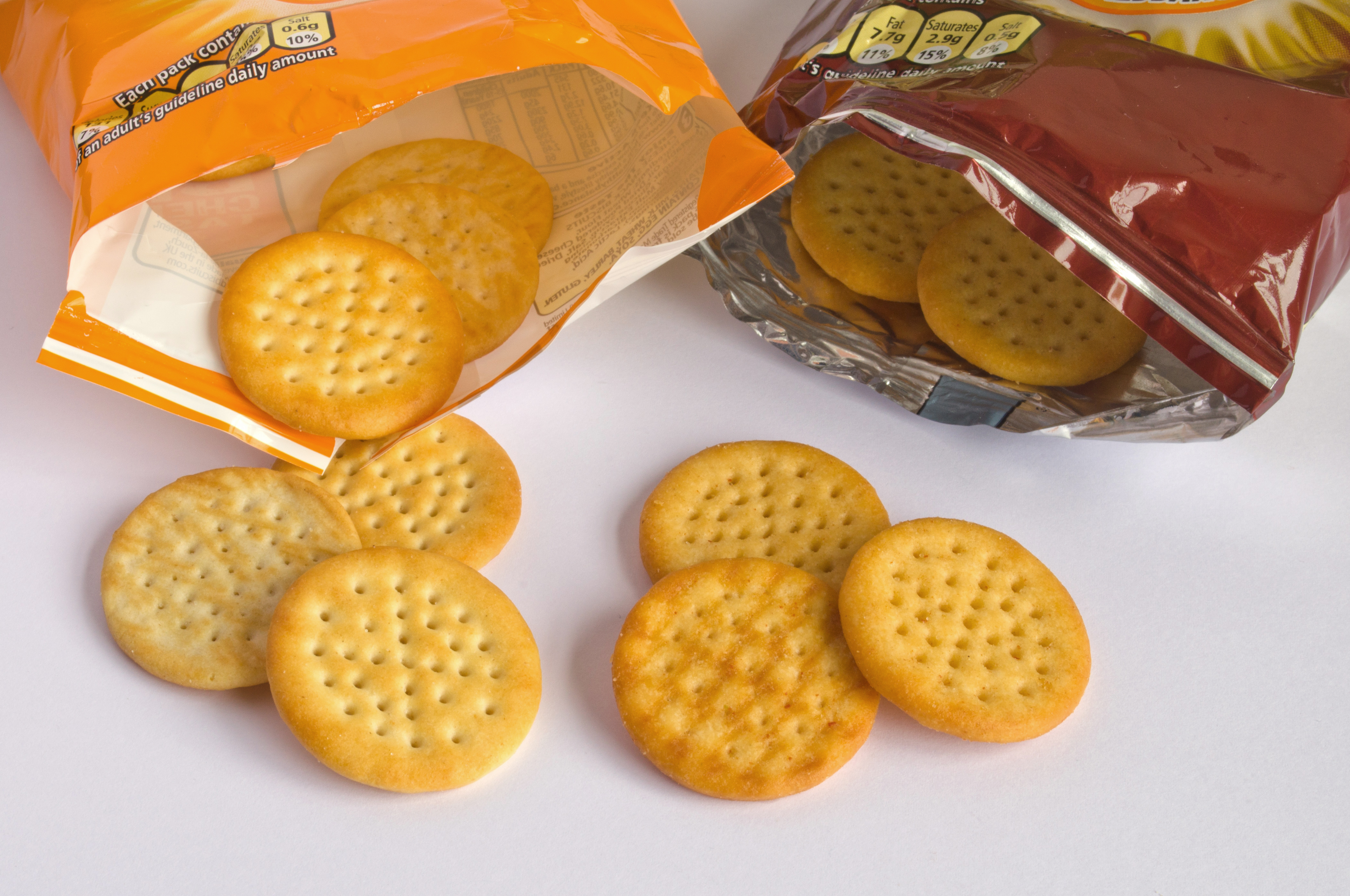
- Mini Cheddars in "original" (left) and "BBQ" (right) flavours
- Type: Savoury biscuit
- Place of origin: UK
- Main ingredients: Wheat flour, cheddar cheese
- Variations: Mini Cheddars

Cheddars are a British brand of baked Cheddar cheese-flavoured savoury biscuits. They were originally manufactured and sold by Crawfords. Until 2014, Cheddars were marketed under the McVitie's brand; they are now sold under the Jacob's brand. Mini Cheddars continue to be marketed under the McVitie's brand in Ireland. Cheddars are made using wheat flour and include real cheese.

== Varieties ==
Mini Cheddars were the result of product diversification by McVitie's in 1984–1985. New flavours were later introduced, including Marmite, BBQ Beef, Branston Pickle, Cheese & Onion, Ham & Cheese, and Mature Cheddar. They are commonly sold as a snack in pubs throughout the United Kingdom and from shops, in one-portion packets and multi-portion drums.

Varieties of crispier, crinkled Mini Cheddars called Crinklys were launched, with Cheese & Onion, Salt & Vinegar, Prawn Cocktail, and Sweet Chili flavours. In 2017, three new cheese flavours were added to the range: Stilton, Red Leicester, and Smoked Applewood. They also released their Mini Cheddar Crispy Thins.

As of 2019, Jacob's Mini Cheddars were available in eight flavours: Cheddar, Smoked Cheddar, BBQ, Red Leicester, Blue Stilton, Monterey Jack, Pepper Jack, and Branston Pickle. In 2020, three new limited edition flavours were added: Nacho Cheese & Jalapeno, Lime and Chilli, and Chipotle Chilli Wings. In 2021, three new flavours were added: Ploughman's, Strathdon Blue Cheese, and Chilli cheddar. However as of 2023, the three versions are no longer available in the UK.

Cheddars Baked Cheese Biscuits are a larger version of the biscuit and usually found in multipacks. They are available in flavours including Cheddar Cheese, Smoked Cheddar, BBQ, Pepper Jack and Branston Pickle. The larger Cheddar biscuit, also referred to as ‘Giant Mini Cheddars’, is the successor of the Mini Cheddars.
