= Cheese Nips =

Cheese-flavored cracker

- Product type: Cracker
- Current owner: Mondelez International
- Country: U.S.
- Introduced: 1955
- Discontinued: 2020; 6 years ago
- Previous owners: Nabisco

Cheese Nips (originally stylized as "Cheese-Nips") is a discontinued small cheese-flavored cracker manufactured by Mondelez International under its brand, Nabisco. They were originally sold to compete against Sunshine Biscuits (now Kellogg's) Cheez-It crackers. Though similar in appearance to Cheez-It, Cheese Nips had a distinctly different flavor and texture.

Portion-controlled packages of Cheese Nips were also sold under the name Cheese Nips Thin Crisps 100 Calorie Packs (Thinsations in Canada).

== History ==
Cheese Nips, originally stylized as "Cheese-Nips", were introduced in 1955. After the Kraft merger, they were known as "Kraft Cheese Nips". However, on November 21, 2019, there was a recall on Cheese Nips due to plastic contamination. In 2020, Cheese Nips were discontinued according to a Nabisco representative. However, as of 2022, they are still sold in Canada by a brand named "Christie" (which is the Canadian counterpart of Nabisco, and also a subsidiary of Mondelēz International) as "Ritz Cheese Nibs."

== In popular culture ==
Cheese Nips is the name of Act 1 Track 8 of the off-Broadway musical Kurt Vonnegut's God Bless You, Mr. Rosewater. In this satire, Sylvia becomes deranged watching her guests prefer Cheese Nips to her other food preparation.

Statista calculates that in 2016, 1.5 million Americans consumed eight or more bags of Cheese Nips.

== See also ==
- Cheese cracker
- Cheez-It
