= The Food That Built America =

American nonfiction docudrama television series

- Genre: Docudrama
- Presented by: Adam Richman and others
- Narrated by: Campbell Scott
- Country of origin: United States
- Original language: English
- No. of seasons: 7
- No. of episodes: 86

Production
- Executive producers: Kim Woodard; Greg Henry; Isaac Holub; Yoshi Stone; Jim Pasquarella; Mary E. Donahue
- Production company: Lucky 8

Original release
- Network: History
- Release: August 11, 2019 – present

The Food That Built America is an American nonfiction docudrama series that premiered on the History Channel on August 11, 2019. Each episode outlines the development of a popular type of food or restaurant in the United States, typically focusing on the rise of two major companies that become rivals. Historical events in the relevant timelines are re-enacted for dramatic effect and interspersed with commentary by culinary historians, business experts, and food enthusiasts.

The series has aired seven complete seasons, with the seventh airing April–July 2026. It is the fourth installment of the That Built franchise.

== Episodes ==
=== Series overview ===
Season	Episodes	Originally released	
Season	Episodes	First released	Last released
1	6	August 11, 2019	August 13, 2019
2	16	February 9, 2021	June 27, 2021
3	12	February 27, 2022	May 15, 2022
4	16	February 19, 2023	July 23, 2023
5	12	February 25, 2024	July 28, 2024
6	10	February 23, 2025	May 4, 2025
7	14	April 19, 2026	July 26, 2026

=== Season 1 (2019) ===
No. overall	No. in season	Title	Original release date	Viewers (millions)
1	1	"Lines in the Sand"	August 11, 2019	1.16
2	2	"Lines in the Sand"	August 11, 2019	1.16
Before they become brand names, budding innovators like Henry Heinz, John and Will Kellogg, and C.W. Post push the limits of ingenuity to launch business that will revolutionize industry, and change the landscape of the nation forever.
3	3	"Best Served Cold"	August 12, 2019	1.36
4	4	"Best Served Cold"	August 12, 2019	1.36
A trailblazer named Milton Hershey bets big on a revolutionary idea, and then a father and son duo named Mars start on a path to challenge the chocolate throne. Plus, the titans of food weather the storm of the First World War and push the boundaries of invention in the Roaring Twenties.
5	5	"The Spoils of War"	August 13, 2019	1.51
6	6	"The Spoils of War"	August 13, 2019	1.51
WWII sees competing industrial empires joining the war effort in a united front to fuel the forces fighting abroad. In Post-War America, visionaries like Harland Sanders, the McDonald brothers and Ray Kroc battle to revolutionize the restaurant industry, and pave the way for the golden age of the American dream.

=== Season 2 (2021) ===
No. overall	No. in season	Title	Original release date	Viewers (millions)
7	1	"Pizza Wars"	February 9, 2021	1.21
Two sets of Irish-American brothers, the Carney brothers in Kansas and the Monaghan brothers in Michigan created the rival pizza restaurant chains in America that became the largest chains in the world, Pizza Hut and Domino's Pizza respectively.
8	2	"Chocolate Rush"	February 14, 2021	1.03
H.B. Reese and Otto Schnering appear in the market to challenge Milton Hershey's chocolate supremacy.
9	3	"The Kings of Burgers"	February 21, 2021	1.25
The founders of Burger King take on the behemoth that is McDonald's by introducing the first signature burger, the Whopper.
10	4	"American Cheese"	February 28, 2021	1.15
James L. Kraft tackles the problem of preserving cheese, developing the first processed cheese. In order to save their company during Prohibition, the Pabst brothers introduce a shelf-stable cheese of their own.
11	5	"Cola Wars"	March 7, 2021	0.99
In the 1970s, Pepsi introduces the Pepsi Challenge to take aim at Coca-Cola head on.
12	6	"Chip Dynasties"	March 14, 2021	1.10
The introduction of convenient salty snacks, from Herman Lay and Charles Elmer Doolin come two of the most iconic foods in America.
13	7	"Cookie Wars"	March 21, 2021	1.07
Cookies and crackers arrive on the market as Nabisco and Sunshine Biscuits battle for biscuit supremacy, introducing Hydrox and Oreo cookies among other favorites.
14	8	"Soup of the Century"	March 28, 2021	0.95
The history of Joseph A. Campbell's creation of condensed soup and his rivalry with Henry Heinz.
15	9	"Godfathers of Fast Food"	April 4, 2021	1.15
The histories of fast food pioneers White Castle and Nathan's Famous.
16	10	"The TV Dinner"	April 11, 2021	1.05
Gilbert Swanson's creation of the TV dinner to use excess frozen turkey while restaurateur Vernon Stouffer's creation of the TV dinner to harness new technology - the microwave.
17	11	"Ice Cream Empires"	April 18, 2021	1.00
Harry Burt and Frank Epperson begin the battle of the ice cream treats in the 1920s.
18	12	"A Game of Chicken"	May 31, 2021	1.00
Donald N. Smith leaves McDonald's to become the Burger King CEO. Fred L. Turner and Ray Kroc churn out the Happy Meal in 1979.
19	13	"When the Chips Are Down"	June 6, 2021	0.82
Herman Lay introduces the first flavored potato chip and steers the merger between Frito-Lay and PepsiCo. At Procter & Gamble, a chemist sets out to develop the perfect potato chip and comes up with Pringles.
20	14	"The Rise of a Rival"	June 13, 2021	0.64
Charles Guth develops a rival to Coca Cola, introducing the world to Pepsi.
21	15	"Gum Slingers"	June 20, 2021	0.75
The birth and growth of the American Chicle and Wrigley in the late 19th and early 20th centuries and the development of the chewing gum industry is dramatized.
22	16	"Breakfast Barons"	June 27, 2021	0.59
C. W. Post and his company battle the Kellogg brothers' Kellogg's in this dramatization about the development of the breakfast cereal industry.

=== Season 3 (2022) ===
No. overall	No. in season	Title	Original release date	Viewers (millions)
23	1	"Submarine Warfare"	February 27, 2022	0.81
The birth in the mid-1960s and growth of the Subway and Blimpie submarine sandwich chains are dramatized.
24	2	"A Cold One"	March 6, 2022	0.86
The birth in the mid-19th century and growth of the Schlitz and the Pabst beer companies are dramatized.
25	3	"Do or Donut"	March 13, 2022	0.89
The birth in the mid-20th century and growth of the Dunkin' Donuts and the Krispy Kreme retail doughnut chains are dramatized.
26	4	"A Dish Best Served... Soft"	March 20, 2022	0.68
The birth in the mid-20th century and growth of the Carvel and Dairy Queen soft serve ice cream chains are dramatized.
27	5	"The Best Thing Since..."	March 27, 2022	0.76
The best thing since sliced bread. This episode is the dramatization of the rise of the Continental Baking Company during the mid-20th century under the leadership of Lee Marshall with the development of Wonder Bread, the first nationwide available pre-sliced white bread, and the supermarket bakery snack Twinkie. This story is contrast with that of the birth and rise of Pepperidge Farm under the leadership of Margaret Rudkin whose company developed a whole wheat bread before diversifying with the introductions of Goldfish crackers and Milano cookies.
28	6	"Cookie Fortunes"	April 3, 2022	0.73
By the 1970s, large food conglomerates such as Nabisco and Keebler had dominated the low cost store-bought cookie market for decades, but none of those cookies had that at-home taste that people crave and willing to pay more money for higher-quality better-tasting cookies. That all changed when entrepreneurs Debbi Fields and Wally Amos respectively created the Mrs. Fields and Famous Amos brands of gourmet chocolate chip cookies.
29	7	"The Beef is On"	April 10, 2022	0.73
A rising star at KFC, Dave Thomas, comes up with some of the most iconic items of the chicken chain's history, such as the red and white bucket. Then, he decides to go off on his own and create Wendy's.
30	8	"Pop Stars"	April 17, 2022	0.85
While Orville Redenbacher spends decades perfecting the popcorn kernel, Frederick Mennen develops a better way to pop popcorn in Jiffy Pop. Meanwhile, General Mills enters the popcorn wars with microwave popcorn Pop Secret
31	9	"Beyond the Burger"	April 24, 2022	0.80
Glen Bell tries to go beyond the hamburger in creating Taco Bell. At the same time, Forrest and Leroy Raffel work on finding a non-burger concept to take on McDonald's, which ultimately introduces Arby's to the world of fast food.
32	10	"Chain Reaction"	May 1, 2022	0.82
In New York, two men each come up with a separate and vastly different idea that turns into one of the biggest chain restaurants in America - Benihana and TGI Fridays.
33	11	"Let Them Eat Snack Cakes"	May 8, 2022	0.89
The battle of the prepackaged snack cakes is on, as Entenmann's and Little Debbie make their way onto America's shelves.
34	12	"Pasta Party"	May 15, 2022	0.86
The rivalry of Kraft and Chef Boyardee over macaroni.

=== Season 4 (2023) ===
No. overall	No. in season	Title	Original release date	Viewers (millions)
35	1	"Breakfast That Pops"	February 19, 2023	0.55
Kellogg's and Post renew their rivalry, this time over breakfast foods that require the use of a bread toaster.
36	2	"Holiday Treats"	February 26, 2023	0.56
The story of how three types of candy become associated with different holidays: conversation hearts for Valentine's Day, candy corn for Halloween, and Peeps for Easter.
37	3	"Flight of the Buffalo Wing"	March 5, 2023	0.50
The development of the chicken wing as a signature American snack, and the rise of two restaurant chains specializing in them: Buffalo Wild Wings and Hooters.
38	4	"Candy Revolution"	March 12, 2023	0.47
The story a of new generation of candies like Nerds, Gobstoppers, Push Pop and Gummy Bears.
39	5	"Clash of the Coffee"	March 19, 2023	0.60
Alfred Peet mentors three friends whose Italian-style coffeehouses eventually become the world's largest chain. The rivalry of coffee titans Starbucks and Dunkin' Donuts leads to new, high-sugar drinks like the Frappuccino which revolutionize the coffee market in America.
40	6	"The Chicken Coup"	March 26, 2023	0.45
The rise of the chicken sandwich under Popeyes and Chick-fil-A.
41	7	"When Food Freezes Over"	April 2, 2023	0.50
The microwave oven helps the rise of frozen food brands like Totino's, Hot Pockets and White Castle's frozen sliders.
42	8	"Thanksgiving Dinner"	April 9, 2023	0.38
The Thanksgiving feast inspires technological innovations including the Butterball frozen turkey and Ocean Spray canned jellied cranberry sauce. Dorcas Reilly invents the green bean casserole for Campbell's, and Ruth Siems creates Stove Top stuffing at General Foods.
43	9	"Peanut Butter Battle"	April 16, 2023	0.47
Joseph L. Rosefield patents a non-separating hydrogenated peanut butter that leads to the rival brands Peter Pan and Skippy. Procter & Gamble changes the market with Jif, which contains more sugar and non-peanut vegetable oils.
44	10	"American Spirits"	April 23, 2023	0.68
American distillers compete against foreign liquors. Bill and Margie Samuels create Maker's Mark, a premium bourbon whiskey; Rudolph Kunett and George Martin market Smirnoff vodka with the Moscow mule cocktail, while appearances in James Bond films popularize the vodka martini.
45	11	"Where There's Smoke"	June 11, 2023	0.50
New inventions come to the American backyard barbecue. Henry Ford and Edward G. Kingsford develop the charcoal briquette which leads to the Kingsford company. Led by Oscar's nephew Carl Mayer, the Oscar Mayer company becomes the leading hot dog brand and launches the Wienermobile. George Stephen invents the Weber kettle grill which redefines outdoor cooking in the 1950s.
46	12	"Thirst Quenchers"	June 18, 2023	0.46
The rise of non-carbonated softdrinks like Hi-C, Kool Aid and Gatorade.
47	13	"Supermarket Sweep"	June 25, 2023	0.63
Bernard Kroger of Kroger and Clarence Saunders of Piggly Wiggly pioneer the modern supermarket by innovating self-service store layouts and bringing specialty foods under one roof. Sylvan Goldman invents the shopping cart, and Norman Joseph Woodland at IBM develops the Universal Product Code.
48	14	"Bring Home the Bacon"	July 9, 2023	N/A
How Oscar Mayer and George A. Hormel modernized America's meat industry.
49	15	"Dog Eat Dog"	July 16, 2023	N/A
Commercial pet food grows from non-existent to a multi-billion dollar industry. Featured brands include Milk-Bone, Friskies, Purina, and 9Lives with its mascot Morris the Cat.
50	16	"Beer Run"	July 23, 2023	N/A
The rivalry of Anheuser-Busch and Miller Brewing Company over lite beer.

=== Season 5 (2024) ===
No. overall	No. in season	Title	Original release date	Viewers (millions)
51	1	"All American Marinara"	February 25, 2024	N/A
The introduction of SpaghettiOs in the 1960s and the Prego brand of pasta sauce in the 1980s by Campbell's. General Mills starts the first nationwide restaurant chain specializing in Italian–American cuisine, Olive Garden.
52	2	"Ice Cream Revolution"	March 3, 2024	N/A
The invention of mix-in ice cream, as well as the founding of Herrell's Ice Cream and Ben & Jerry's. Around the same time, Dairy Queen introduced their Blizzard.
53	3	"Soda Rising: Birth of Pop"	March 10, 2024	N/A
The origins of soft drink brands Hires Root Beer and Dr. Pepper is depicted.
54	4	"Sunshine in a Glass"	March 17, 2024	N/A
The origins of orange juice brands Minute Maid and Tropicana are depicted.
55	5	"Let Them Bake Cake"	March 24, 2024	N/A
The origins of the Betty Crocker and Duncan Hines brands are presented, stemming from efforts to formulate an easy-to-use boxed cake mix.
56	6	"Penny Candy Craze"	March 31, 2024	N/A
The origin of the Tootsie Roll and the Charms Candy Company, triggering a wave of popularity in penny candy sales to the general public.
57	7	"Champions of Breakfast"	April 14, 2024	N/A
The rise of General Mills as a competitor to Kellogg's in the breakfast cereal industry, spurring a race to develop new cereal types and marketing techniques with the introduction of Wheaties, Pep, Rice Krispies, Kix, Cheerios, Frosted Flakes, and Trix.
58	8	"Planet Mars"	April 21, 2024	N/A
The founding of Mars Inc. and the disagreements between Franklin Clarence Mars and his son Forrest, who strikes out on his own to expand the family brand into Europe and turn it into a candy-making powerhouse.
59	9	"Lunchbox Legends"	July 7, 2024	N/A
The development of three products from the 1960s through the 1980s that revolutionize schoolchildren's lunches – Kraft Singles, individually wrapped cheese slices; Joray Fruit Rolls, dried fruit snacks that become the forerunner of Fruit Roll-Ups; and Lunchables, pre-packaged meat/cheese/cracker meals.
60	10	"The Colonel"	July 14, 2024	N/A
The story of Harland Sanders and his new method for cooking fried chicken is presented, tracing his path from small-time restaurant owner to founder of Kentucky Fried Chicken and then to strident critic of the cost-cutting measures imposed by the company's new owners after he sells it.
61	11	"Citrus Soda Stars"	July 21, 2024	N/A
The development of two citrus-flavored soda brands, 7 Up and Mountain Dew, as a counterattack against the cola products offered by the Coca-Cola and Pepsi companies that dominate the soft drink industry in the early 20th century.
62	12	"Burger Empire: The Ray Kroc Story"	July 28, 2024	N/A
The career of Ray Kroc is presented, chronicling his purchase of a small hamburger restaurant company in California and efforts to grow it into the worldwide McDonald's fast food chain through franchising and product/kitchen innovation.

=== Season 6 (2025) ===
No. overall	No. in season	Title	Original release date	Viewers (millions)
63	1	"Tortilla Takeover"	February 23, 2025	N/A
The developments of bottled salsa by Pace Foods and of the Frito-Lay tortilla chip brands Doritos and Tostitos are presented, culminating in the introduction of chips and salsa to the American public.
64	2	"Movie Theatre Munchies"	March 2, 2025	N/A
Two new entrants into the candy business, and a movie theater employee who sees a future in selling snacks at entertainment venues, give rise to the modern theater concession stand and some of the world's best-known candy brands sold there, including Milk Duds, Sno-Caps, Raisinets, and Goobers.
65	3	"Baking Chocolate Chip History"	March 9, 2025	N/A
In the 1930s, inn owner Ruth Graves Wakefield devises a chocolate chip cookie recipe using Nestlé chocolate that has far-reaching effects on herself, the company, and both the snack food and baking supply industries.
66	4	"Empire of Convenience"	March 16, 2025	N/A
The development of the modern convenience store is presented, with a focus on the founding of 7-Eleven and its distinctive products such as the Slurpee slush drink and Big Gulp beverage line.
67	5	"Legends of the Mall"	March 23, 2025	N/A
Three companies – Panda Express, Cinnabon, and Auntie Anne's – bring new life to the shopping mall food court by adapting their recipes and marketing methods to attract and quickly serve large numbers of customers.
68	6	"Coffee: A Brewed Awakening"	March 30, 2025	N/A
Starting in the 1850s, advances in coffee roasting, grinding, and preparation touch off a series of revolutions in the American industry for the beverage, with brands such as Folgers, Maxwell House, Mr. Coffee, Starbucks, and Keurig vying for position in it.
69	7	"A Box of Chocolates"	April 13, 2025	N/A
The founding of Whitman's and Russell Stover Candies is presented, focusing on their strategies to distinguish their high-quality chocolates from those of their mass-market competitors and the development of the chocolate sampler box. In the process, Russell Stover plays a role in the creation of the Eskimo Pie ice cream bar, and Whitman's use of coconut inspires the Peter Paul Candy Manufacturing Company to market the Mounds candy bar.
70	8	"Beer Necessities"	April 20, 2025	N/A
After taking charge of a brewery in the late 19th century that will eventually become Anheuser-Busch, Adolphus Busch creates its flagship Budweiser brand and a nationwide market for it through new methods of brewing, packaging, transporting, and marketing beer. Note: Footage from the 2022 History miniseries The Booze, Bets and Sex That Built America was reused for this episode.
71	9	"Asian Food Invasion"	April 27, 2025	N/A
Momofuku Ando and his company Nissin Foods develop instant ramen and introduce it to the United States as Cup Noodles. Cecilia Chiang brings authentic Mandarin cuisine to San Francisco; decades later, her son Philip Chiang and restaurateur Paul Fleming found the P. F. Chang's restaurant chain.
72	10	"You Don't Know Jack"	May 4, 2025	N/A
After the Civil War, distiller Jack Daniel strives to create and market a high-quality whiskey, leading to the founding of his namesake brand and setting the stage for its struggles to survive in the face of the temperance and prohibition movements. Note: Footage from The Booze, Bets and Sex That Built America was reused for this episode.

=== Season 7 (2026) ===
No. overall	No. in season	Title	Original release date	Viewers (millions)
73	1	"Pizza Power Play"	April 19, 2026	N/A
Starting in the late 1970s, the rise of Little Caesars as a rival to Pizza Hut and Domino's sparks a heated three-way battle for dominance in the American pizza industry, focused on product innovation, menu expansion, and marketing strategies. Meanwhile, Pizza Hut co-founder Frank Carney's bitterness toward his own company after selling it leads him into a long association with Papa John's, boosting it to national prominence alongside the three rivals.
74	2	"Cereal Killers"	April 26, 2026	N/A
In the 1950s, General Mills and the Quaker Oats Company challenge Kellogg's for dominance in the breakfast cereal market, targeting children with new flavors, advertising campaigns, and production processes. Competition among the three companies leads to the creation of well-known brands such as Cocoa Puffs, Trix, Cocoa Krispies, Life, Froot Loops, Cap'n Crunch, and Lucky Charms.
75	3	"The Birth of Bubblegum"	May 3, 2026	N/A
During the first half of the 20th century, Fleer and Topps create a market for chewing gum geared toward children, respectively developing the Dubble Bubble and Bazooka brands of bubble gum. The two companies' success, fueled by packaging the gum with baseball cards and the introduction of the Bazooka Joe mascot character, prompts rivals to unveil their own products such as Bubble Yum, Bubblicious, Hubba Bubba, and Big League Chew.
76	4	"Drive-Thru Burger Revolution"	May 10, 2026	N/A
The development of modern drive-through fast food service is presented, beginning with the founding of In-N-Out Burger and Jack in the Box after World War II. The new method gives rise to sweeping changes in the areas of restaurant organization/management and menu offerings, with Wendy's and McDonald's among the first chains to serve both dine-in and drive-through customers.
77	5	"Chocolate in a Glass"	May 17, 2026	N/A
The chocolate drink industry starts to grow in the 1920s, with Hershey formulating a syrup for mass distribution and soda fountain owner Natale Olivieri creating the bottled beverage Yoo-hoo. Meanwhile, dairy farmer Charles Sanna's ventures in powdered milk production lead to the debut of the Swiss Miss brand of instant hot cocoa in the 1960s.
78	6	"Clash of the Cookie Giants"	May 31, 2026	N/A
The growth of the snack cookie industry is presented, stemming from the launch of Sunshine Biscuits' Hydrox and Nabisco's Oreo sandwich cookies at the start of the 20th century. After the homemade chocolate chip cookie outstrips both products' popularity in the 1950s, companies rush to capitalize on the trend, giving rise to brands such as Chips Ahoy!, Famous Amos, and Mrs. Fields.
79	7	"Cheesecake Chronicles"	June 7, 2026	N/A
Over half a century after the creation of Philadelphia Cream Cheese in 1872, a New York restaurant sets off a nationwide dessert craze by using it in a sweet cheesecake recipe. The idea to sell a frozen version fuels the rise of the Sara Lee Corporation in Chicago, while a Detroit housewife opens a specialized bakery that eventually leads to the founding of The Cheesecake Factory restaurant chain in the 1970s.
80	8	"Rice to Riches"	June 14, 2026	N/A
Rice moves up from the fringes of the American diet due to savvy marketing strategies and the development of quick, straightforward methods for preparing it. Uncle Ben's and Minute Rice emerge from World War II military food contracts, followed by Rice-A-Roni in the 1950s as a ready-to-cook product with pre-packaged seasonings.
81	9	"Burgers, Burritos, & the Battle for Fast Food"	June 21, 2026	N/A
Starting in the 1980s, Taco Bell rises to the status of a nationwide fast food chain with the help of free soda refills, a value menu, and new advertising and menu items. McDonald's counters by introducing "super size" food/drink options, then investing in the newly founded Chipotle Mexican Grill and its balance between speed and quality as a ploy to undercut Taco Bell.
82	10	"Icons of Ice Cream"	June 28, 2026	N/A
In the 1920s, ice cream begins to rise from niche treat to nationally popular dessert, thanks to innovative formulations and delivery/distribution methods. The Good Humor bar and Eskimo Pie help to start the craze, followed by brands such as Carvel, Ben & Jerry's, and Dairy Queen that emerge in their wake to expand the range of available products and flavors.
83	11	"Spilling the Tea"	July 5, 2026	N/A
Starting in the 1970s, Lipton launches an effort to revive its sales by introducing iced tea to the American public nationwide. The campaign inspires a trio of bottled-juice makers to enter the field with the Snapple brand, prompting Lipton to counter with its own new lines of canned/bottled teas; later, the emergence of the Arizona Beverage Company touches off a three-way battle for market dominance.
84	12	"Let's Get Cracker-ing"	July 12, 2026	N/A
Experiments with shredded wheat by businessman Henry Perky lead to the creation of the Triscuit xnack cracker in the 1900s, while an Ohio company formulates the Cheez-It brand in the 1920s. The two products are later acquired by Nabisco and Sunshine Biscuits, respectively, setting off an upheaval in the American cracker industry and a fierce, decades-long struggle for control of it.
85	13	"Cereal Sensations"	July 19, 2026	TBD
Starting in the late 19th century, the success of Kellogg's Corn Flakes spurs a nationwide interest in cereal as a breakfast food. General Mills and Post enter the industry, resulting in a heated three-way rivalry fueled by a steadily expanding range of grains, flavors, textures, production methods, and advertising strategies.
86	14	"Say Yes to the Dressing"	July 26, 2026	TBD
In the early 1900s, delicatessen owner Richard Hellmann develops a shelf-stable mayonnaise, then founds his namesake company as a way to market it nationwide. Its use as a condiment puts a new focus on ready-to-use salad dressing, with Wish-Bone rising to challenge powerhouse Kraft, and a plumber in Alaska formulating a sauce that eventually spawns the Hidden Valley Ranch brand.

== Production ==
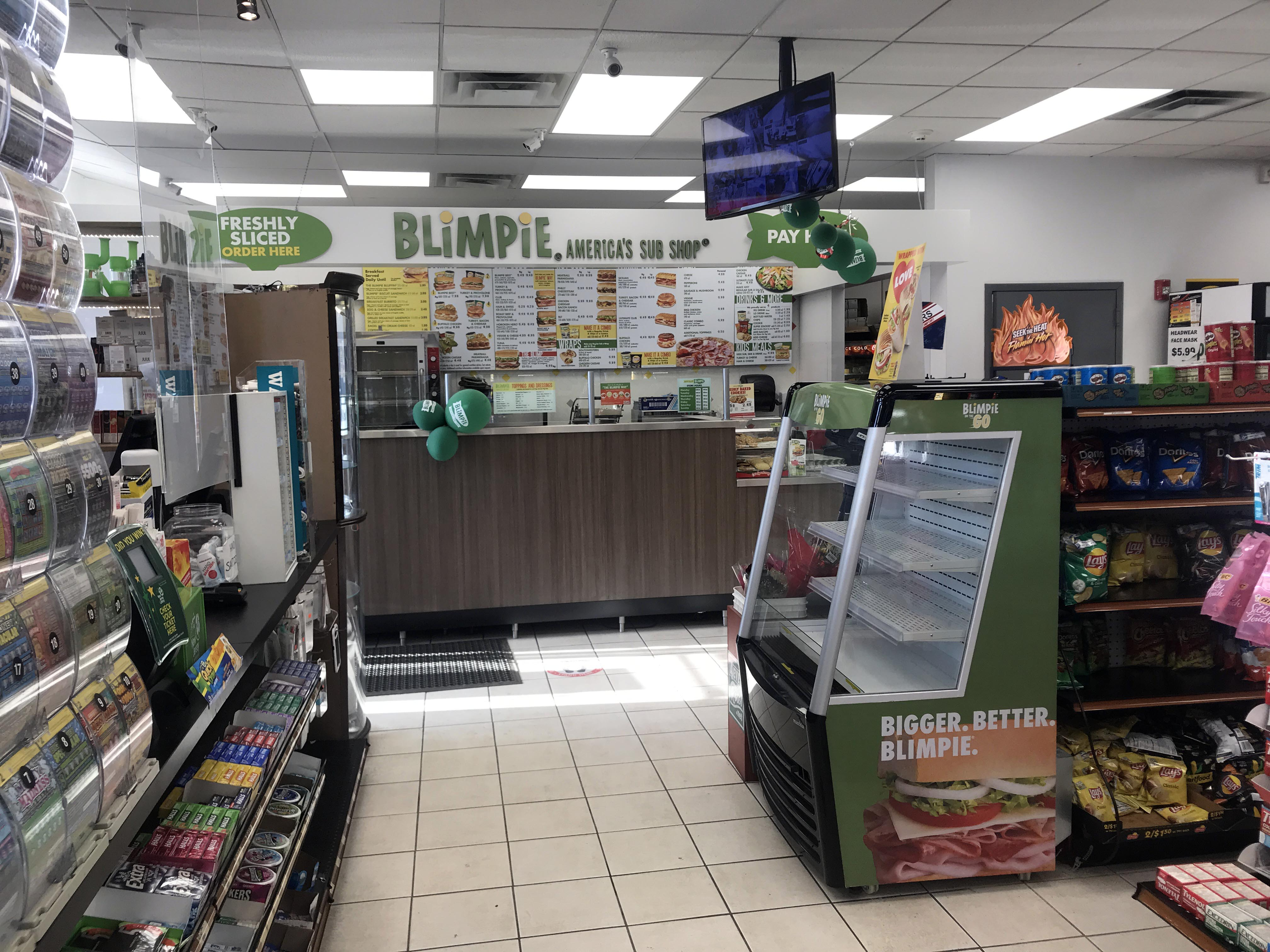
Photo of the Blimpie in North Bergen, New Jersey, which was used in the series' third-season premiere

In March 2019, the series was green-lit. In May 2020, the series was renewed for a second season. Yoshi Stone is the series' showrunner. Along with Stone, Kim Woodard, Greg Henry, and Isaac Holub executive produce for Lucky 8. Jim Pasquarella and Mary E. Donahue executive produce for the History Channel.

== Reception ==
The first season garnered a total of 18.8 million viewers.

== Podcast ==
In February 2021, the History Channel partnered with Ozy Media to launch a podcast of the same name. The first episode premiered on February 4, 2021.

== The Food That Built America: Snack Sized ==
In 2021, the producers of The Food That Built America created a new series called The Food That Built America: Snack Sized by reediting some episodes to approximately half of the original size through the elimination of food historian commentary and some minor scenes to make smaller size episodes with a faster pace.
