= Philip Chiang =

Chinese-born American businessman

Philip Chiang（江一帆）is a Chinese-American entrepreneur who co-founded P. F. Chang's.

== Life and career ==
=== Early life ===
Chiang was born in 1948 in Shanghai. He spent his childhood in Japan, his parents having fled China in 1949 due to the Communist takeover. His father served as a diplomat for Taiwan. With relatives in California, Chiang's mother, Cecilia Chiang, later moved with him and his sister to San Francisco's Chinatown.

=== Career ===
His culinary career began in the 1960s when his mother initiated "The Mandarin", one of the first U.S. Chinese restaurants to include Chinese food outside of Cantonese cuisine. The Mandarin extended its operations to include a Beverly Hills, California, location.

Following his graduation with a B.F.A. from the ArtCenter College of Design, Chiang took control of The Mandarin, and later started the Mandarette in West Hollywood, California.

In 1992, Chiang collaborated with Paul Fleming, for a Chinese restaurant in Scottsdale, Arizona. A year later, in 1993, he co-founded P.F. Chang's China Bistro.
