= Dan and Frank Carney =

American businessmen brothers

Dan Carney
- Carney in 1977
- Born: October 6, 1931; Kansas City, Missouri, U.S.
- Died: November 13, 2026 (aged 95); Wichita, Kansas, U.S.
- Occupation: Business executive
- Known for: Pizza Hut

Frank Carney
- Born: April 26, 1938; Wichita, Kansas, U.S.
- Died: December 2, 2020 (aged 82); Wichita, Kansas, U.S.
- Education: Wichita State University
- Occupation: Business executive
- Known for: Co-founder of Pizza Hut, franchisee of Papa John's

Brothers Dan (October 6, 1931 – November 13, 2026) and Frank Carney (April 26, 1938 – December 2, 2020) were American businessmen who founded the pizza restaurant chain Pizza Hut.

== Early years ==
Dan and Frank Carney were born into a blended family of twelve children, and raised in Wichita, Kansas, where Dan still resided at the time of his death in 2026. Although Frank Carney dropped out of Wichita State University, where he studied engineering, he later returned to the university to receive a degree in general studies and mathematics.

== Pizza Hut ==
In 1958, the Carney brothers borrowed $600 from their mother and opened a pizza restaurant catering to students after a local real estate agent with an unrented building convinced them that pizza would be a promising business. Although they knew little about pizza-making or business, they learned quickly and the business started to grow. Their first franchise opened in Topeka, Kansas, in 1959. The Pizza Hut in Aggieville, Kansas, was the first to have delivery, an innovation. By 1977, Pizza Hut had grown to 4,000 outlets and the brothers decided to sell the business to PepsiCo for over $300 million USD. Frank remained the president and a board member of Pizza Hut until 1980.

The Carney brothers have been featured in the History Channel series The Food That Built America.

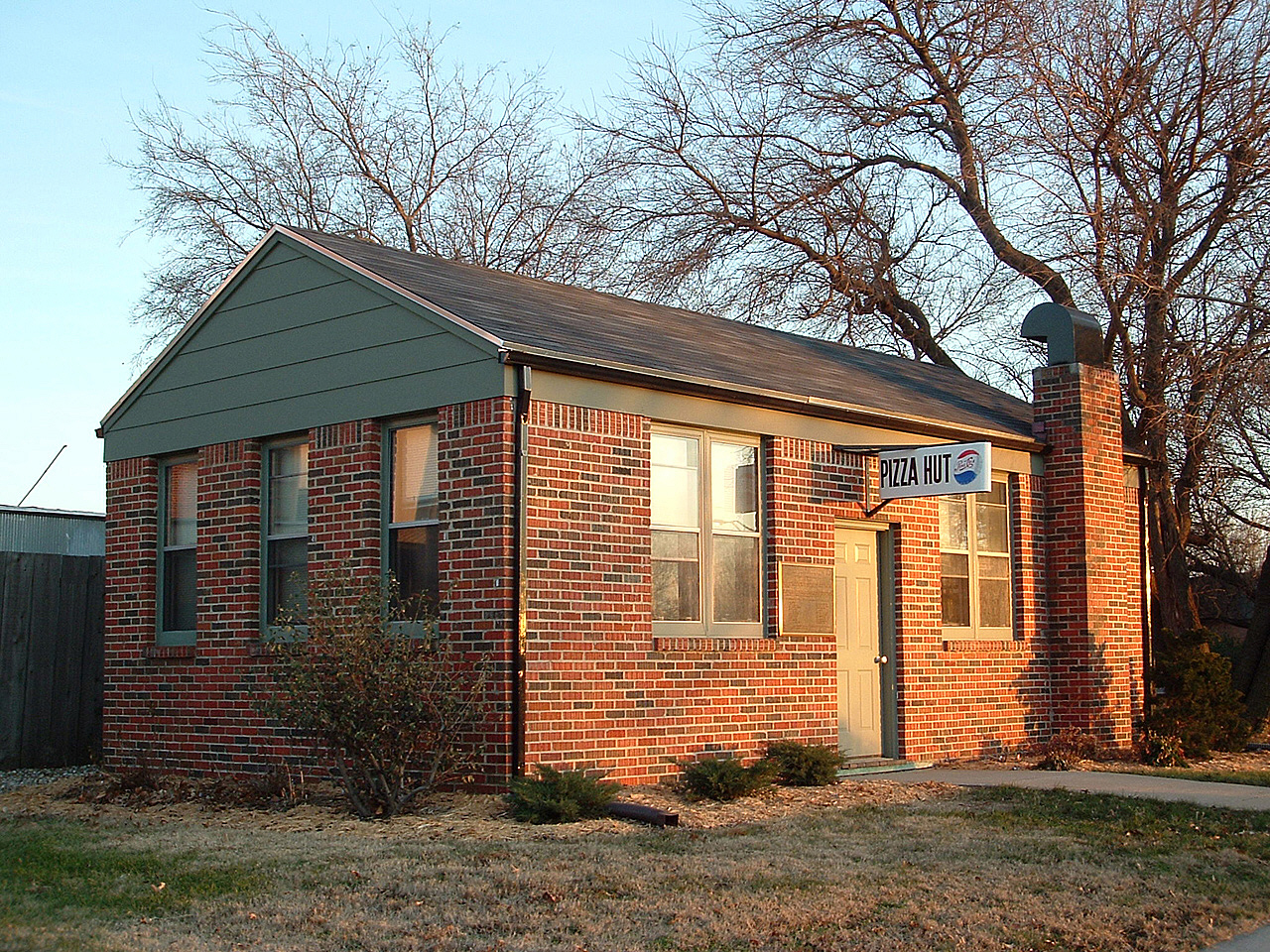
The First Pizza Hut, currently at Wichita State University Campus

== Later years ==
=== Frank ===
Frank became a franchisee of Papa John's Pizza in 1994. By 2001, he owned 133 locations. Based in Houston, his company runs stores in Kansas, Arizona, Missouri, California, Texas and Hawaii, including several in his hometown of Wichita and the suburbs of Derby and Andover, under the franchise name PJ Wichita LLC., before selling the franchise to then Franchise President Terry Newman. During legal struggles with Pizza Hut in the late 1990s, Papa John's ran commercial advertisements highlighting the fact, including a dramatization showing Frank coming to a Pizza Hut stockholders' meeting wearing a Papa John's apron, saying, "Sorry, guys. I found a better pizza."

He sat on the board of Intrust Financial Corp., Intrust Bank, N.A. He was the past president of the International Franchise Association (IFA) and the Wichita Area Chamber of Commerce. Industry honors include the 1975 Silver Plate Award from the International Foodservice Manufacturers Association, and the 1974 Man Of The Year in the Multi-Unit Foodservice Organization. He received the Golden Plate Award of the American Academy of Achievement in 1976. He was a 1991 inductee into the IFA Hall of Fame. From 1980 to 1986, Frank was the Managing General Partner of the Wichita Wings of the Major Indoor Soccer League, and remained part owner of the club until the folding of the league in 1992.

Frank was diagnosed with Alzheimer's disease in 2009. He died from pneumonia following a recovery from COVID-19, at 4:30 a.m. on December 2, 2020, at the age of 82.

=== Dan ===
Dan spent several years of his adult life playing recreational polo along with his son, professional polo player, Mike Carney, president of Fairfield Polo Club in Wichita, Kansas. In 2001, he was awarded the Junior Achievement Wichita Business Hall of Fame.

He was featured in the 2024 documentary film Slice of Life: The American Dream. In Former Pizza Huts. Dan died in Kansas on November 13, 2026, at the age of 95. He was a parishoner of Holy Savior Catholic Church.
