= Margaret Rudkin =

American businesswoman (1897–1967)

- Born: Margaret Fogarty; September 14, 1897; New York City, US
- Died: June 1, 1967 (aged 69); New Haven, Connecticut, US
- Other name: Margaret Fogarty Rudkin
- Occupations: Baker, businesswoman
- Known for: Founder of Pepperidge Farm, first woman on the board of directors at Campbell's
- Spouse: Henry Albert Rudkin
- Children: 3

Margaret Loreta Rudkin (née Fogarty; September 14, 1897 – June 1, 1967) was an American businesswoman who founded Pepperidge Farm and was the first female member of the board at the Campbell's.

== Early life ==
On September 14, 1897, Rudkin was born as Margaret Loreta Fogarty in Manhattan, New York City, New York. Rudkin's parents were Joseph J. Fogarty, an Irish clerk, and Margaret Healy. She was the eldest of her four siblings. Rudkin had reddish hair and green eyes. Rudkin learned cooking from her grandmother, who started her off with cakes and biscuits. The family moved to Flushing, Queens, after her grandmother's death. She studied finance and graduated valedictorian from her high school.

== Career and innovations ==
Initially, she worked as a bank teller in Flushing. In 1919, she got a job at the investment company McClure Jones and Co., where she met her husband, Henry Rudkin, a Wall Street stock broker. They married in 1923. She quit her job at the beginning of the Great Depression and moved to a farm in Fairfield, Connecticut, despite having no experience on a farm.

Rudkin grew up baking with her grandmother, who taught her the basics of cakes and biscuits. These skills she would go on to hone when she began making bread. Her son's asthma and severe allergies were attributed to over-processed food and preservatives, so his doctor recommended a diet of fruits, vegetables, and other minimally processed foods. Using her grandmother's recipe, Rudkin decided to make a stone-ground whole wheat bread – more nutritious than store-bought white bread, which lost vitamins and minerals in processing and was artificially fortified. Other ingredients she used included whole milk, butter, honey, and molasses. Rudkin stated, "Natural foods and natural sugars and the wheat germ contained in old-fashioned whole wheat bread might help this child who needed special food". Though she struggled in her early attempts, through trial and error she came up with a type of bread that tasted good. She proudly showed the doctor her creation; he wrote a letter endorsing it and began to recommend the bread to his patients. She visited other doctors, who in turn recommended her bread to their patients. Rudkin then made deals with grocers in the area; it is rumored she convinced one grocer by allowing him a taste. The bread did come at a steeper cost, at 25 cents, compared to 10 cents for other bread. Eventually she outgrew her kitchen, and then her garage‚ and bought her first factory in 1940. The company expanded quickly: a year prior, Reader's Digest published an article on Pepperidge Farm, introducing it to readers across the United States and Canada and leading to increased sales. The company was one of the first successful examples to focus on healthy, natural food.

Additionally, Rudkin was known for being a feminist. She paved the way for women in the workforce and believed women should be hired as they had demonstrated abilities in household management. She would go on to hire many women, married or unmarried, offering them flexible working conditions. Rudkin stated that she believed there was no job a man could do that a woman could not. For her efforts, she went on to win the Medallion of Honor at the Women's International Exposition in 1955. Fortune called her "one of its 50 most powerful businesswomen" from 1950 to 1960. One author notes that she at one point "had the distinction of being the only woman to speak at the Harvard School of Business Administration three different times."

Her husband joined the company in 1949 and it became a family business. The couple traveled to Europe in the 1950s, which in turn would inspire a number of products such as Milanos and Brussels cookies and Goldfish crackers.

Rudkin sold Pepperidge Farm to Campbell's for $28.2 million worth of Campbell's stock in 1961, a handsome return on her investment of 24 years prior. As part of the deal, Rudkin received a seat on Campbell's board, becoming its first female director.

Rudkin is still considered to be a leader in many industries and her legacy lives on through Pepperidge Farm. The company continues to thrive and is a household name in the United States. The average annual growth rate of the company was 53% even 26 years after its initial founding.

== Personal life ==
On April 8, 1923, Rudkin married Henry Albert Rudkin, a Wall Street stockbroker. They had three sons. In 1929, Rudkin moved to a property named Pepperidge Farm in Fairfield, Connecticut. On April 22, 1966, Rudkin's husband died at the age of 80. On June 1, 1967, Rudkin died of breast cancer at Yale-New Haven hospital in New Haven, Connecticut. She was 69.

Rudkin is buried in Woodlawn Cemetery in The Bronx, New York City. Her son Mark became a landscape architect known for working on famous gardens in France, such as the Jardins du Nouveau Monde.
