= Soul of a Banquet =

- Directed by: Wayne Wang
- Produced by: Jonathan Bing; Wayne Wang; Richard Wong
- Starring: Cecilia Chiang
- Cinematography: Richard Wong
- Edited by: Richard Wong
- Music by: Dean Harada
- Distributed by: Oscilloscope Laboratories
- Release date: February 23, 2014 (Miami)
- Running time: 79 minutes
- Country: United States
- Language: English

Soul of a Banquet is a 2014 American documentary film about Chinese-American restaurateur and chef Cecilia Chiang. It was directed by Wayne Wang.

== Participants ==
The following people appeared in the documentary:

- Cecilia Chiang
- Alice Waters
- Ruth Reichl
