= Pepperidge Farm =

American commercial bakery

Pepperidge Farm Incorporated
- Type: Subsidiary
- Industry: Food
- Founded: 1937; 89 years ago
- Founder: Margaret Rudkin
- Headquarters: Camden, New Jersey
- Key people: Kenneth Gosnell
- Products: Cookies, crackers, breads, desserts
- Brands: Goldfish
- Parent: The Campbell's Company
- Website: pepperidgefarm.com

Pepperidge Farm Incorporated is an American commercial bakery founded in 1937 by Margaret Rudkin, who named the brand after her family's 123-acre farm property in Fairfield, Connecticut, which had been named for the pepperidge tree.

A subsidiary of the Campbell's Company since 1961, it is based in Norwalk, Connecticut. On January 18, 2023, the company announced plans to close its Norwalk headquarters, consolidating jobs held there to Campbell Soup Company headquarters in Camden, New Jersey.

== History ==
Margaret Rudkin began baking bread in 1937 for her youngest son, Mark, who had asthma and was allergic to most commercially processed foods. Her son's doctor recommended the bread to his other patients and encouraged her to sell it to the public. Her first commercial sale was to her local grocer in Fairfield, Conn., Mercurio's Market. Rudkin's husband Henry, a Wall Street broker, began taking loaves of bread with him to New York to be sold in specialty stores. Rudkin moved the growing business out of her kitchen and into her garage, and then into a factory in 1940. Rationing during World War II forced her to cut back production due to the restricted availability of quality ingredients. In 1947, Rudkin opened a modern commercial bakery in Norwalk, Connecticut, and soon after added plants in Illinois and Pennsylvania.

On a trip to Europe in the 1950s, Rudkin discovered fancy chocolate cookies that she believed would be popular in the United States. She bought the rights to produce and sell them, and the Distinctive Cookies line was born. Under her management, Pepperidge Farm continued to expand into other products, including frozen pastry items and, later, the Goldfish snack cracker from Switzerland. In 1961, she sold the business to the Campbell's for $28 million and became the first woman to serve on its board of directors. She drew on her knowledge and experience to write The Margaret Rudkin Pepperidge Farm Cookbook in 1963, which was the first cookbook ever to make the New York Times Best Seller list.

The Pepperidge Farm logo is based on the Grist Mill in Sudbury, Massachusetts, which supplied the company with 48 tons of whole wheat flour monthly from 1952 to 1967.

During the 1970s and 80s, the company used the slogan "Pepperidge Farm remembers" for a long-running television commercial campaign that leaned heavily upon nostalgia, particularly of life in the early decades of the 20th century.

== Products ==
Pepperidge Farm products include Goldfish crackers, varieties of bread, and several lines of cookies. Their cookies are separated into two lines, the Distinctive line and the Farmhouse line. Most types of cookies from the "Distinctive" line are named for a European city such as the Milano cookie or the Brussels cookie. The Distinctives cannot be readily replicated by home bakers. In contrast, the Farmhouse line emphasizes commonplace cookies like chocolate chip and shortbread types that anyone could bake for themselves in an ordinary home kitchen.

== List of Pepperidge Farm products ==
Examples of Pepperidge Farm products include:

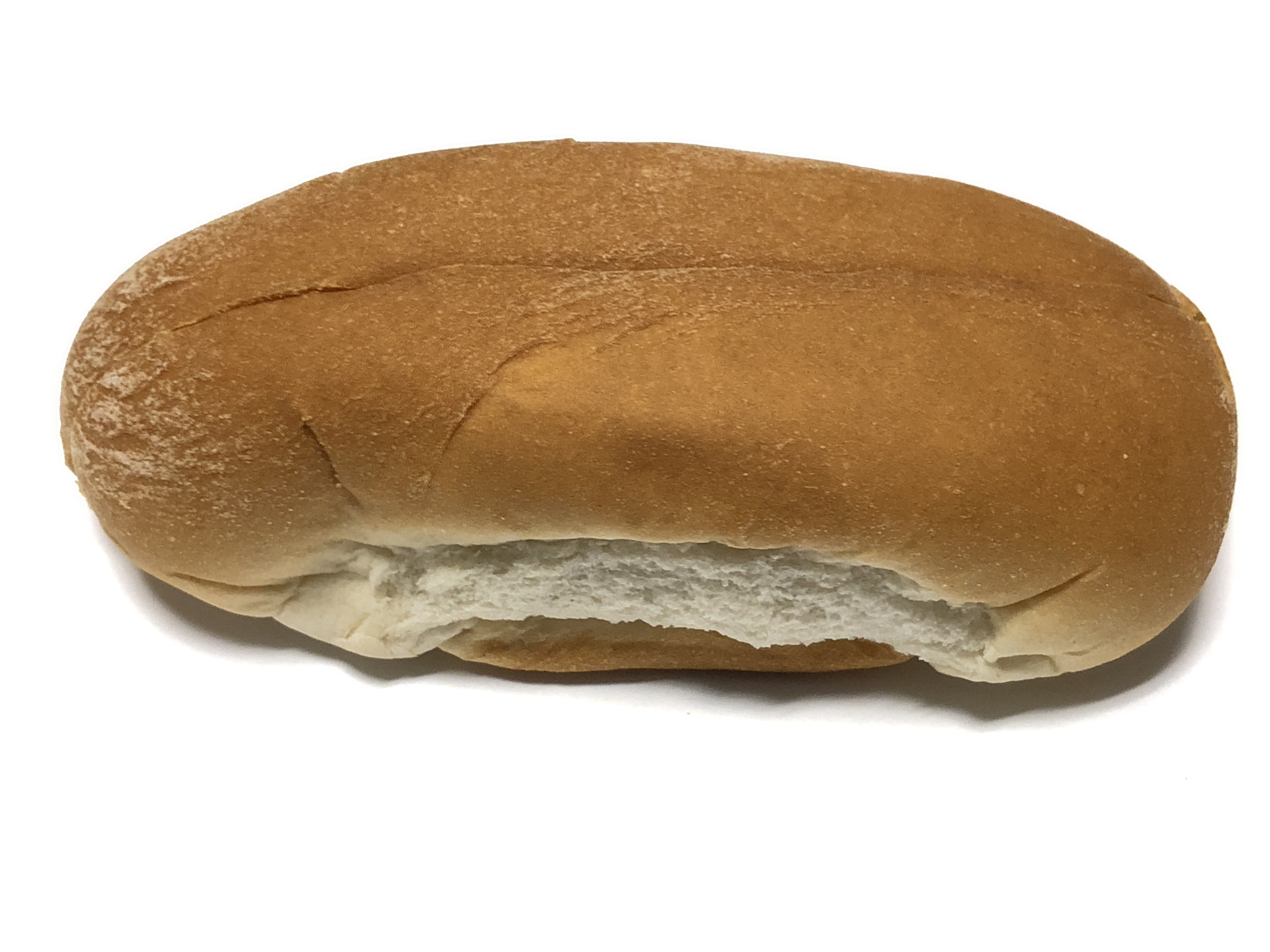
Hot dog bun

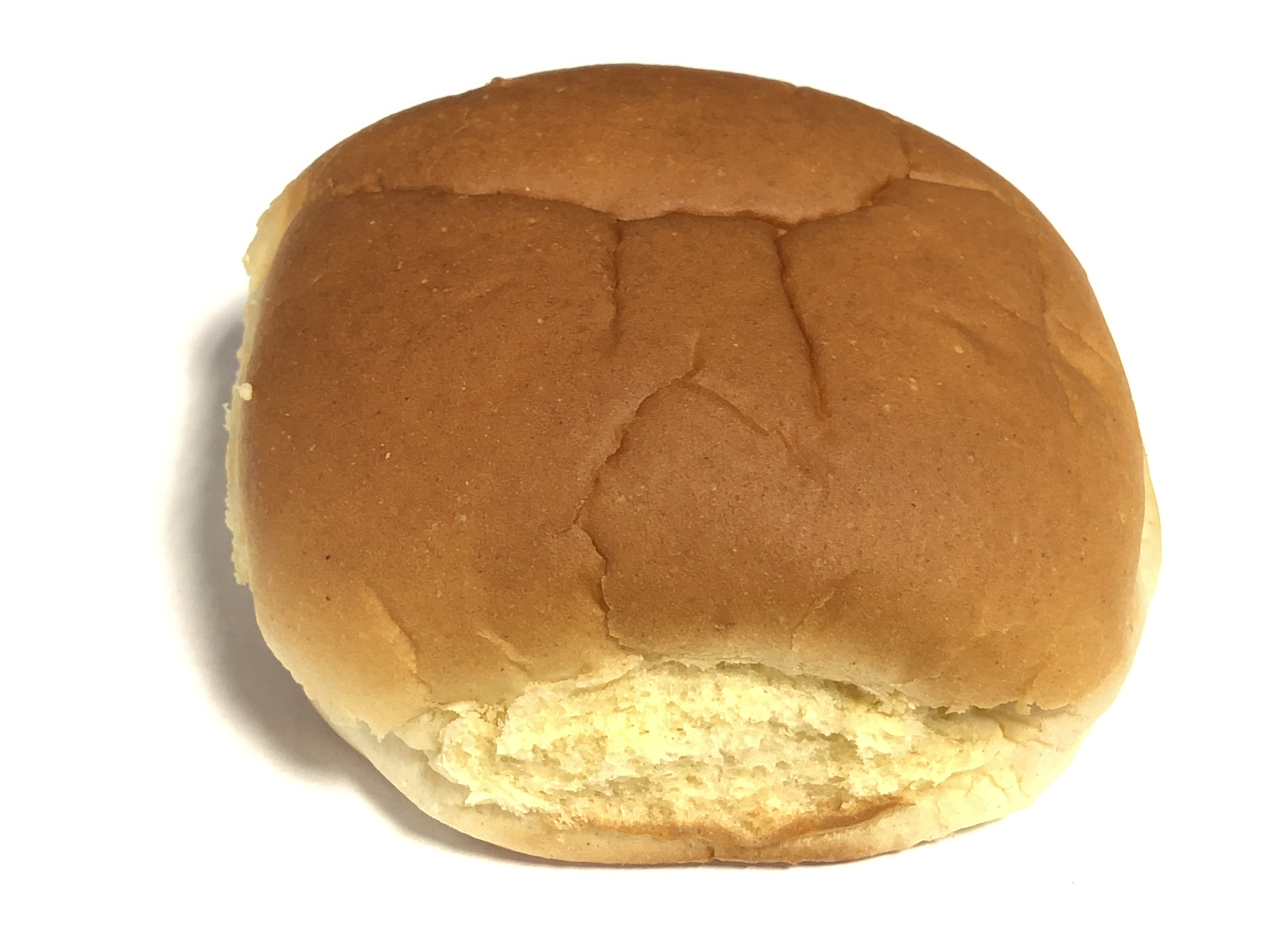
Hamburger bun

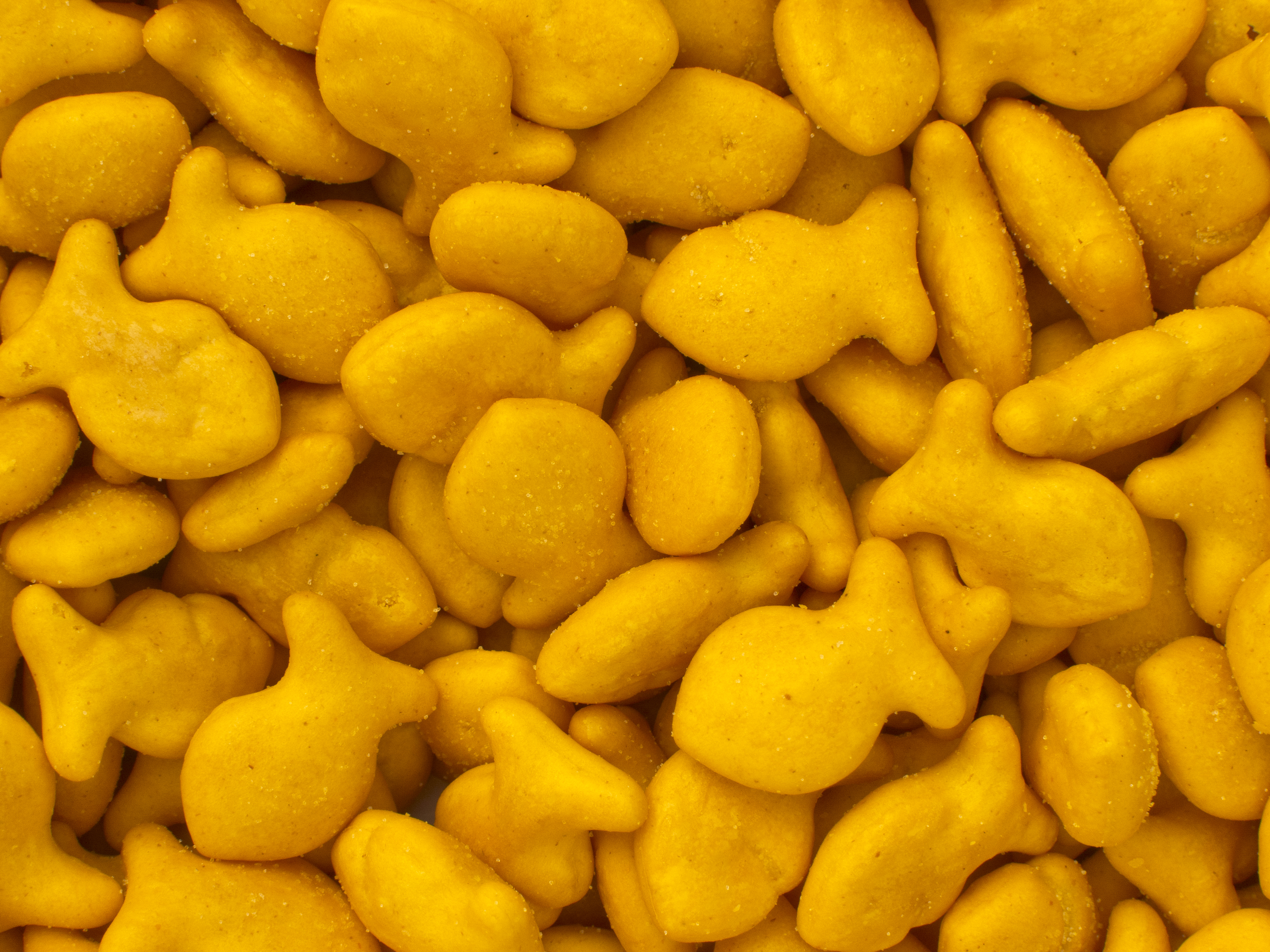
Goldfish crackers

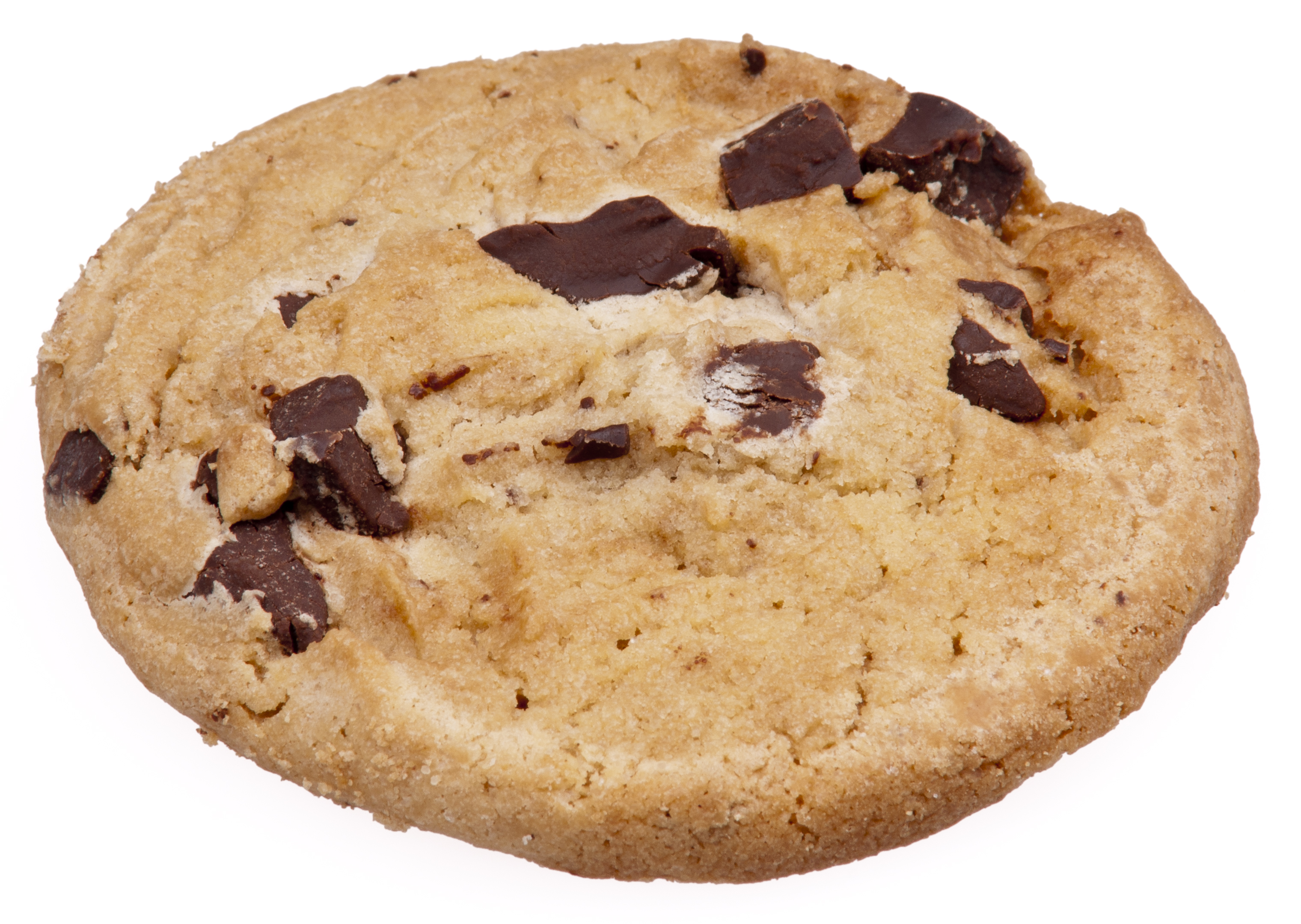
Chunk Cookie

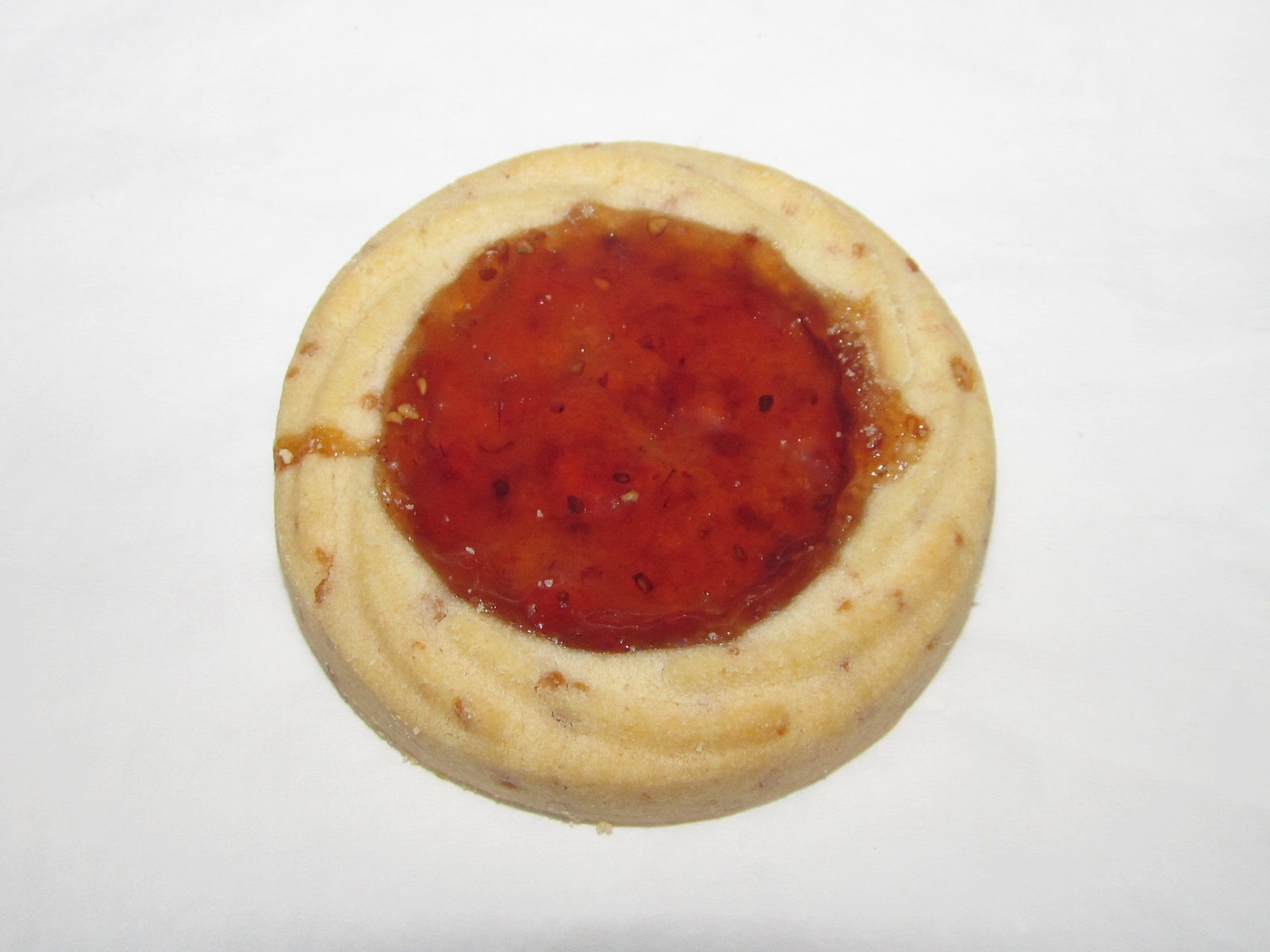
Strawberry cookie

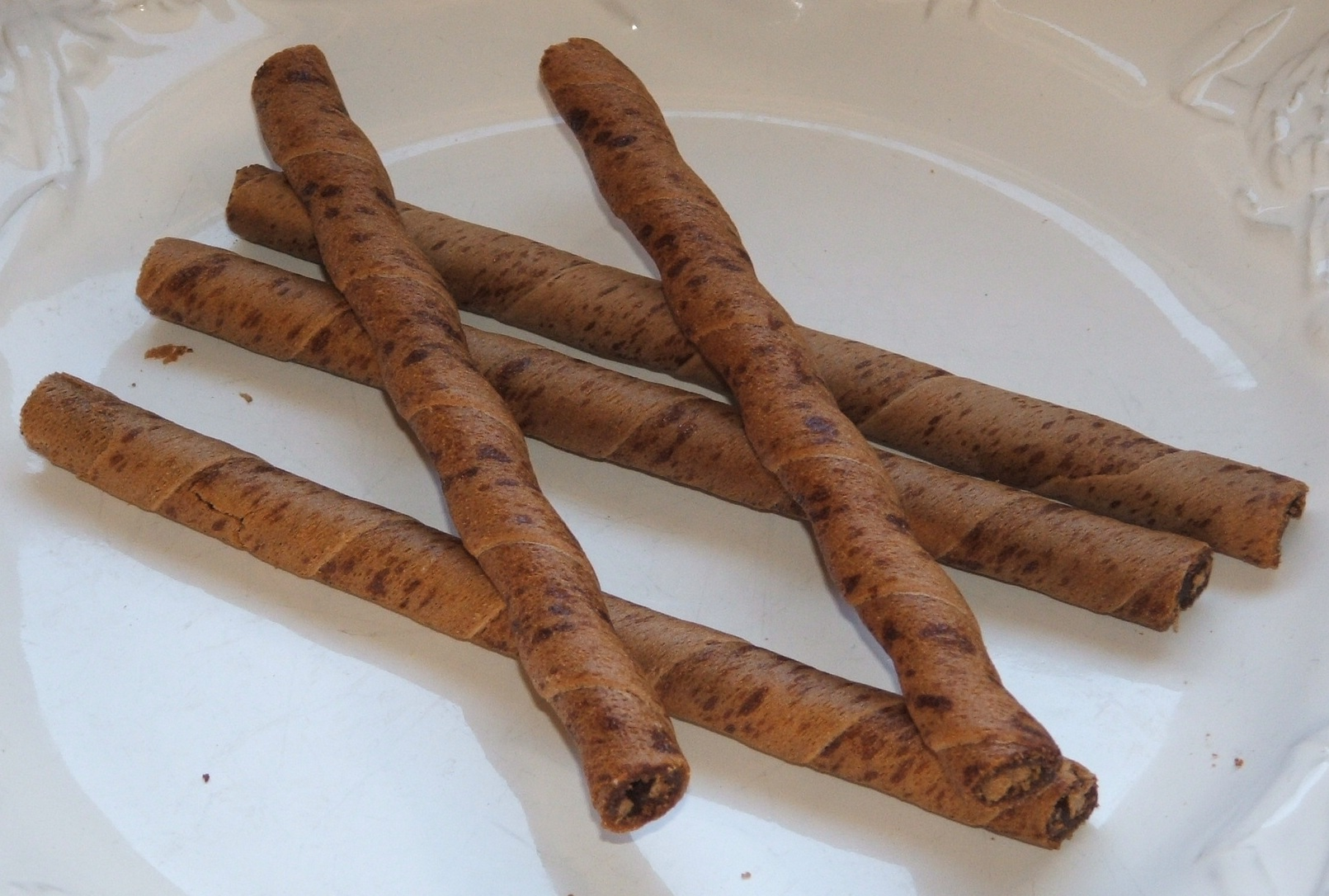
Pirouette cookies

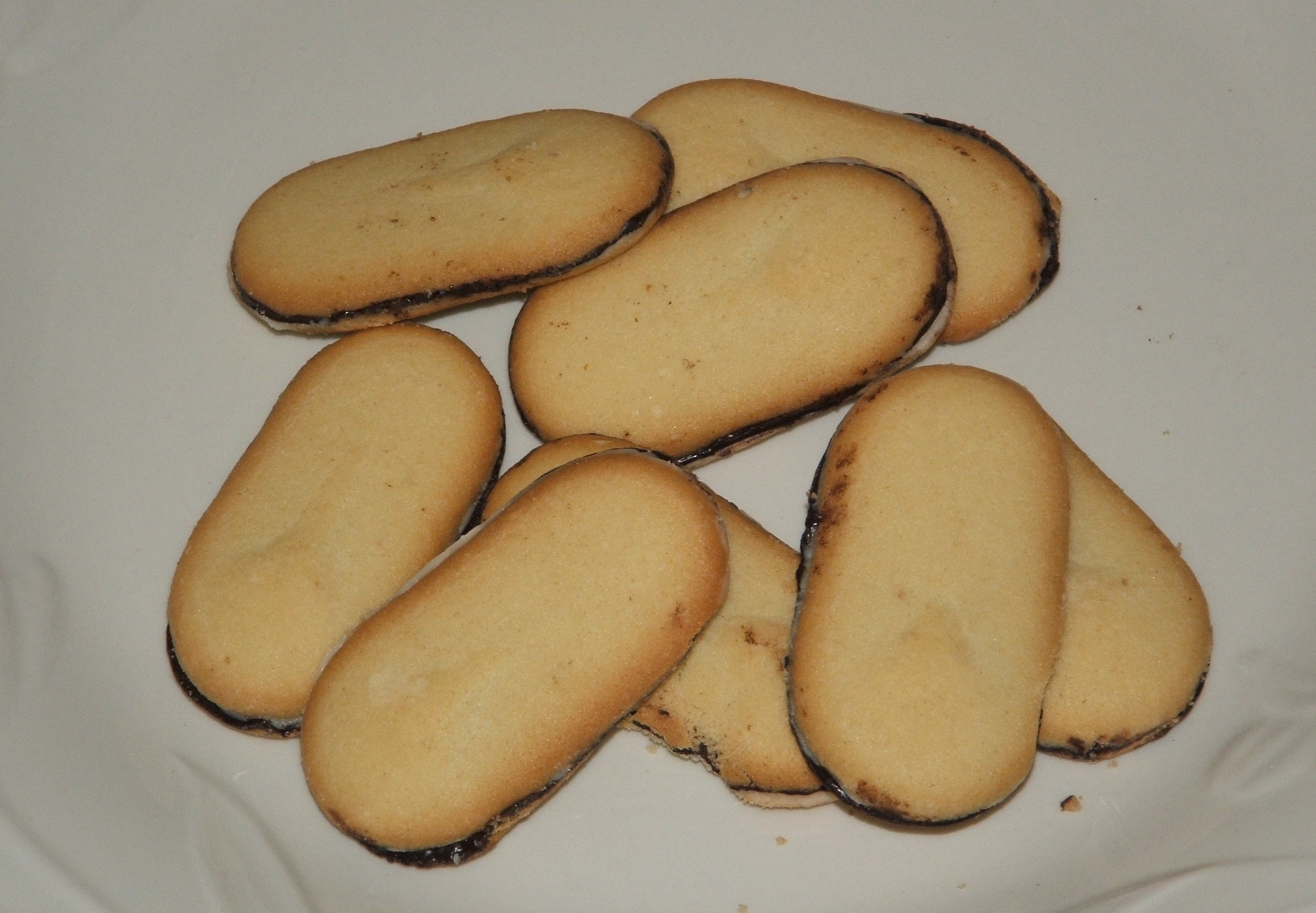
Milano cookies

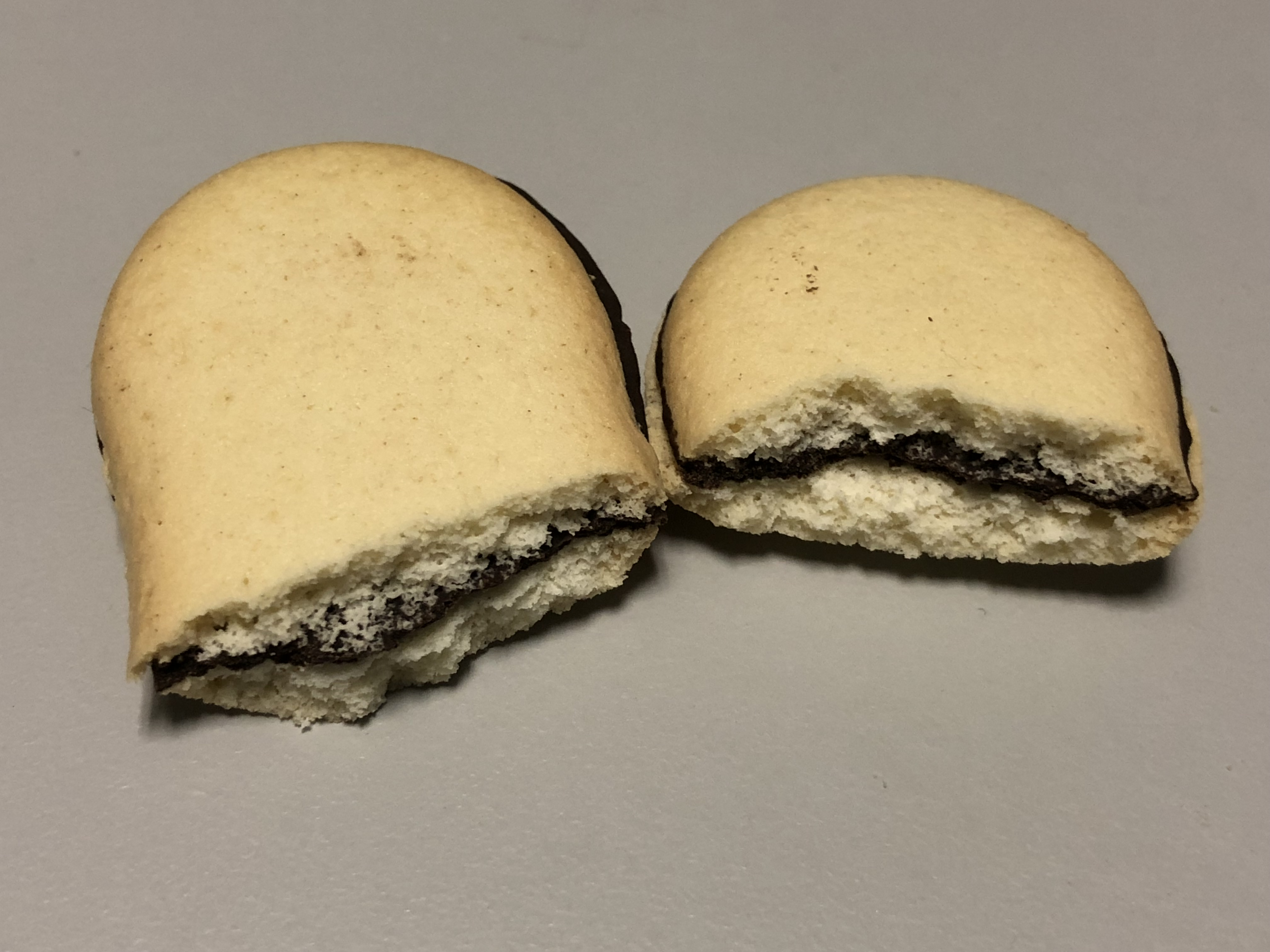
Milano chocolate

- Breads, Buns & Rolls
  - Bagels
  - Breakfast Breads
    - Swirl Breads
    - Bagels
  - Buns & Rolls
    - Dinner Rolls
    - Pepperidge Farm Farmhouse Bun
    - Hamburger Buns
    - Hoagie Rolls
    - Hot Dog Buns
    - Slider Buns
  - Frozen Breads
    - Garlic Bread
    - Texas Toast
  - Sandwich Breads
    - Pepperidge Farm Farmhouse Breads
    - Italian Breads
    - Light Style Breads
    - Rye & Pumpernickel Breads
    - Very Thin Breads
    - White Breads
    - Whole Grain Breads
    - Whole Grain Thin Sliced Breads
  - Stuffing
- Cookies
  - Brussels
  - Chunk Cookies
  - Cookie Collections
  - Distinctive Cookies
    - Chessmen
  - Milano
    - Milano Slices
    - Milano Cookies
  - Pepperidge Farm Farmhouse
    - Gluten Free Pepperidge Farm Farmhouse Cookies
    - Pepperidge Farm Farmhouse Cookies
  - Pirouette
- Crackers
  - Cracker Trio
  - Golden Butter
  - Harvest Wheat
- Desserts & Puff Pastry
  - Layer Cakes
  - Puff Pastry
  - Turnovers
- Goldfish Crackers
- Favorites
  - Original
  - Pretzel
  - Cheddar
  - Baby Cheddar
  - Pizza
  - Parmesan
  - Colors (Cheddar Favored)
- Baked With Whole Grain-
  - Colors (Cheddar Favored)
  - Cheddar
- Flavor Blasted (Extra Flavor Added)
  - Cheddar & Sour Cream
  - Cheddar Jack'd
  - Sour Cream & Onion
  - Xtra Cheddar
  - Xtra Cheesy Pizza
- Goldfish Grahams
  - Fudge Brownie
  - Vanilla Cupcake
  - Grahams S'mores
- Goldfish Mix

Mix Cheddar + Zesty Cheddar + Parmesan Mix Xtra Cheddar + Pretzel

- NON-GMO INGREDIENTS (Made With Organic Wheat)
  - Cheddar
- Special & Limited Editions
  - Frank's RedHot Crackers
  - Old Bay Seasoned Crackers
  - Star Wars: The Mandalorian (Cheddar)
  - Disney Mickey Mouse (Cheddar)
  - Princess Cheddar Crackers
  - Dunkin' Pumpkin Spice Grahams

== See also ==
- List of bakeries
- List of brand name breads
