= P. F. Chang's =

American restaurant company

P.F. Chang's Inc.

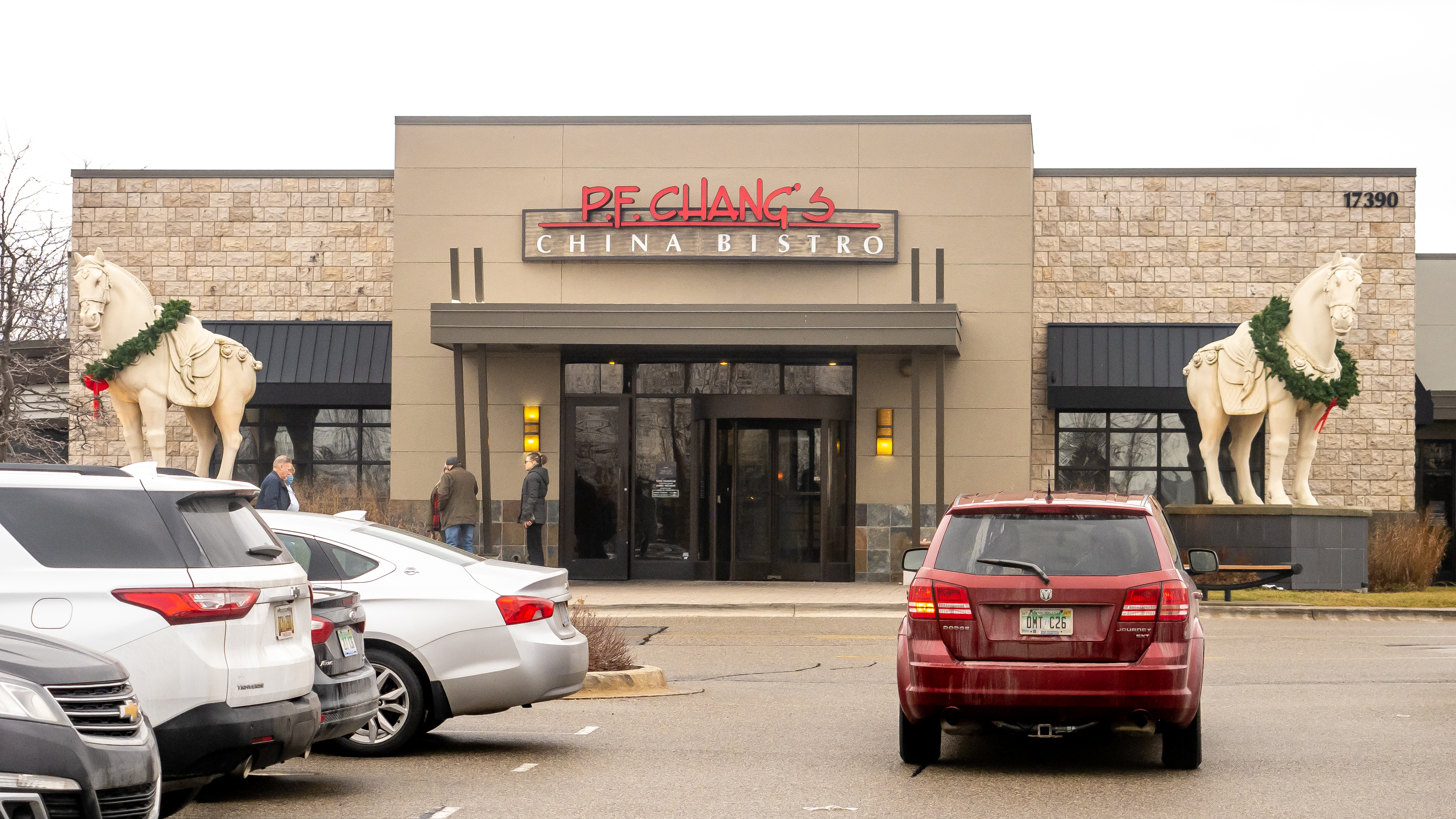
- Restaurant in Clinton Township, Macomb County, Michigan
- Trade name: P.F. Chang's China Bistro
- Type: Private
- Industry: Restaurant
- Genre: Casual dining
- Founded: 1993; 33 years ago Scottsdale, Arizona, U.S.
- Founders: Paul Fleming; Philip Chiang
- Headquarters: 8377 E. Hartford; 2nd Floor; Scottsdale, AZ 85255
- Number of locations: More than 300 (Worldwide, 2021)
- Area served: Worldwide
- Key people: Jim Mazany, CEO; Corey Robertson, COO
- Products: American Asian cuisine
- Owner: TriArtisan Capital; Paulson & Co.
- Website: pfchangs.com

P. F. Chang's China Bistro is an American casual dining restaurant chain founded in 1993 by Paul Fleming and Philip Chiang that serves Asian fusion cuisine. Centerbridge Partners owned and operated Chang’s until acquired by the private equity firm TriArtisan Capital Advisors on March 2, 2019. P. F. Chang's is headquartered in Scottsdale, Arizona.

The chain specializes in American Chinese cuisine, plus other Asian dishes. P.F. Chang’s operates 300 locations in 22 countries and U.S. airports, including P.F. Chang’s To Go takeout locations.

The name “P.F. Chang’s” is derived from Fleming’s initials (P.F.) and Chiang’s last name, with the “I” omitted.

== History ==
The chain was founded in 1993 by Paul Fleming and Philip Chiang, son of restaurateur Cecilia Chiang. The first restaurant was opened at the Scottsdale Fashion Square in Scottsdale, Arizona. In 1993, P.F. Chang's China Bistro, Inc. was formed from the acquisition of the original four bistro restaurants. By December 2001, P.F. Chang's owned and operated 65 full-service P.F. Chang's China Bistro restaurants. The company also developed its Pei Wei Asian Diner concept and operated five Pei Wei locations by the same date.

=== 2004 restatement ===
On March 15, 2004, Chang’s reported that it had modified its partnership accounting, which resulted in a restatement of its financial results for prior years. On March 17, 2005, the company adjusted its accounting for leases in order to conform with U.S. generally accepted accounting principles. Accordingly, management and the audit committee determined that the company’s previously issued consolidated financial statements, including those in the company’s Annual Report on Form 10-K for the fiscal year ended December 28, 2003, and those in the company’s Quarterly Reports on Form 10-Q for the first three fiscal quarters of 2004, should no longer be relied upon.

=== 2010s ===
In 2010, P.F. Chang's Home Menu was introduced in supermarkets. The brand represents a group of frozen appetizers and meals that were sold under license by Unilever.

In 2012, Chang's accepted an offer from private investment firm, Centerbridge Partners in a deal valued at $1.1 billion. ConAgra Foods, Inc. acquired the P.F. Chang's Home Menu license from Unilever in August 2012.

In mid-2014, P.F. Chang's confirmed that a breach had occurred targeting credit and debit cards used at their restaurants. The breach was initially identified by Brian Krebs, a cybersecurity journalist.

In 2015, P.F. Chang's filed for bankruptcy for its Canadian division.

In 2017, Pei Wei was officially split from P.F. Chang's as a separate business.

In December 2017, P.F. Chang’s announced that they would open a location in Shanghai during the first part of 2018, P.F. Chang’s first location in China. The Shanghai location was marketed to local Chinese customers as American food, and had 10 menu items unique to the company's China operations. Additionally, as of 2018 P.F. Chang's operated a restaurant in South Korea.

In January 2019, Chang’s announced it was in talks to be sold to TriArtisan Capital Partners and Paulson & Co. for approximately $700 million from its previous owner, Centerbridge Partners.

=== 2020s ===
In January 2020, Chang’s announced its first P.F. Chang’s To Go take-out only location would be in Chicago, Illinois.

In mid-2020, P.F. Chang’s obtained more than $5 million in small-business loans as part of the Paycheck Protection Program (coronavirus relief).

In February 2023, P. F. Chang’s signed an agreement with Indian company Gourmet Investments to open outlets in India. The first P. F. Chang's outlet in India was opened on January 14, 2024 in Mumbai.

== Menu ==
The chain specializes in Asian fusion cuisine. Special items on their menu include Chang's Lettuce Wraps, Chang's Spicy Chicken, Peking duck, and various types of sushi. Wine, specialty drinks, Asian beers, sake, cappuccino, and espresso are available outside standard beverage offerings.

In September 2025, P.F. Chang’s launched a revamped menu, featuring a collection of cocktails, hand-rolled sushi, garlic noodles, half-sized appetizers, and choices between medium and traditional entrée sizes.

== See also ==
- List of Chinese restaurants
- Panda Express
- Pei Wei Asian Diner
