= Paul Fleming (restaurateur) =

American restaurateur

Paul Martin Fleming is an American restaurateur. He has developed a number of restaurant chains, including P. F. Chang's China Bistro, Fleming's Prime Steakhouse & Wine Bar, Pei Wei Asian Diner, Z’Tejas Grills, and Paul Martin's American Grill.

== Early life ==
Fleming is a native of Franklin, Louisiana, and was raised in New Iberia, Louisiana. His parents were Betty Angers and Robert Martin Fleming, his father worked as a superior court judge. His grandfather was a farmer. Fleming's access to fresh, local produce as a child was a large influence on his restaurant career.

Fleming graduated from both Louisiana State University and Loyola University. As a student at Loyola in New Orleans, Fleming first worked in the hospitality industry. While Fleming was attending Louisiana State University, he got his first restaurant job as a dishwasher at Saturday's. From there, he became busboy, server, bartender, and finally, the manager.

Fleming raised a family in Arizona. Then he moved to Calistoga, California in Napa Valley, where he and his first wife Kelly made wine from the organic grapes Paul grew. They purchased the land in 1998, and in 2002 the Kelly Fleming Winery was founded.

Fleming and his wife, Jody Goodenough-Fleming, reside in Southwest Florida.

== Career ==
Prior to working in restaurants, Fleming worked in the oil industry. When the oil industry collapsed, Fleming moved to Los Angeles. There, he began purchasing franchise rights to Ruth's Chris Steak House, which he acquired in three states: California, Arizona, and Hawaii.

In 1984, Fleming opened his first Ruth's Chris in Beverly Hills. In 1985, he opened another in Phoenix. Fleming opened his third location in San Francisco and a fourth in Hawaii. He eventually sold all of the franchises back to Ruth's Chris.

Fleming is the founder P.F. Chang's China Bistro, which first opened in Scottsdale, Arizona in 1993. The name P.F. Chang's is derived from Paul Fleming's initials (“PF"). He also conceptualized Pei Wei Asian Diner, a casual, quick-service offshoot of P.F. Chang's. P.F. Chang's was sold in 2012 for US$1.1 billion.

With co-founder Bill Allen, Fleming developed another restaurant chain that bears his name: Fleming's Prime Steakhouse & Wine Bar, which started in 1998 in Newport Beach, California.

In 2006, Fleming partnered with restaurateur Brian Bennett to start Paul Martin's American Grill. Specializing in Classic American cuisine, the first grill opened in 2007 in Roseville, California. There are six restaurants in California, one in Arizona, and one in Austin, Texas.

In 2019, Fleming made a minority investment in a Barcelona-inspired tapas restaurant Boqueria. Fleming also invested in the Tex-Mex restaurant Tacos & Tequila Cantina, which he later sold in 2021.
