= Pei Wei Asian Diner =

American restaurant chain serving Pan Asian food

Pei Wei Asian Diner, LLC

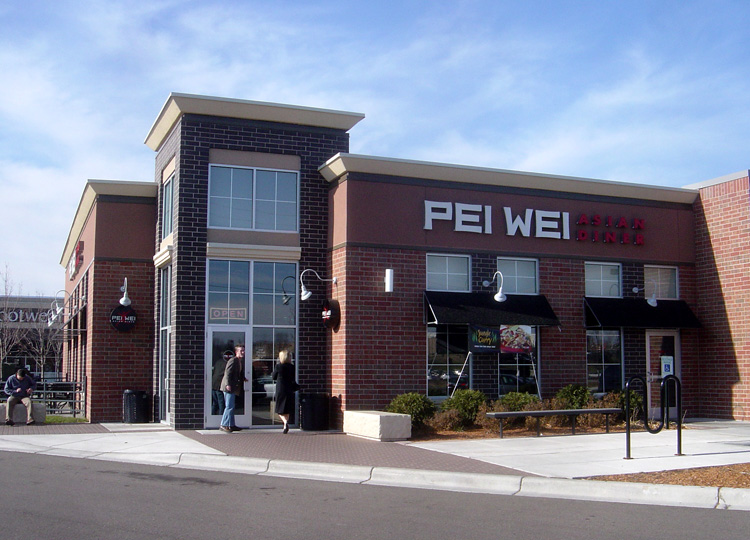
- Pei Wei Asian Diner, Eden Prairie, Minnesota
- Trade name: Pei Wei Asian Kitchen
- Formerly: Pei Wei Asian Diner (2000–2018)
- Type: Private
- Industry: Restaurant
- Genre: Fast Casual
- Founded: 2000; 26 years ago in Scottsdale, Arizona as Pei Wei Asian Diner
- Headquarters: Irving, Texas, United States
- Number of locations: 119 (2021)
- Area served: United States
- Key people: Lorne Goldberg, CEO
- Products: American Asian cuisine
- Owner: PWD Acquisition LLC
- Website: www.peiwei.com

Pei Wei Asian Diner, LLC, doing business as Pei Wei Asian Kitchen, (/ˌpeɪ ˈweɪ/)) is an American restaurant chain serving Pan Asian fare, operating in at 119 locations in the United States. Pei Wei's dishes are made to order in an open concept kitchen using cooking methods like wok firing. The restaurant offers guest customization that includes vegetarian and gluten-free options.

Pei Wei's concept is defined by the restaurant industry as fast casual, offering the convenience of counter service and cashier orders, paired with table service once an order has been placed. Pei Wei also has a designated door in the restaurant for cashiers to service takeout food orders.

== History ==
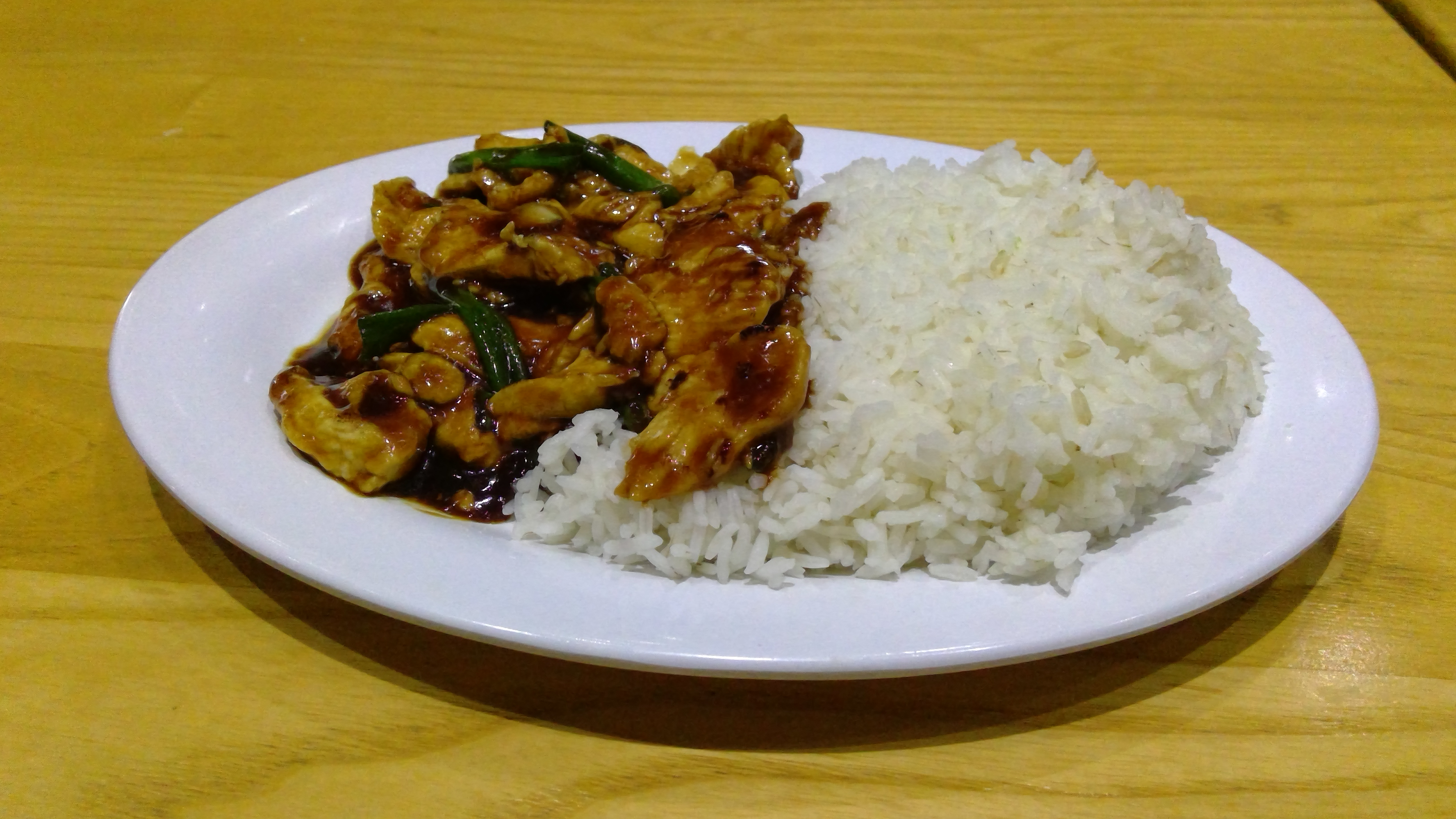
Mongolian-style chicken with scallions and rice

The restaurant chain, founded by restaurateurs Paul Fleming and Rick Federico, and created as Pei Wei Asian Diner in 2000 by P. F. Chang's China Bistro (PFCB) to compete in the fast casual restaurant segment with a Pan Asian menu and quick, made-to-order service model, while P. F. Chang's remained in the full-service restaurant segment. The first Pei Wei location opened in Scottsdale in 2000. The first location outside of Arizona, the fourth in the chain, was opened in Dallas, Texas, in December 2001. The company opened its first California location, the sixth in the chain, in Irvine in June 2002. Pei Wei was able to open its 100th location in Little Rock, Arkansas, in October 2006. By 2010, the company had 168 locations primarily in California, Texas, Arizona and Florida, with a growing presence in the Northeast and Midwest.

P.F. Chang's China Bistro, Inc. was acquired by Centerbridge Partners in July 2012, making P. F. Chang's China Bistro an indirect, wholly owned subsidiary of Wok Parent L.L.C.

Over the years, Pei Wei's dining experience has evolved to feature modern conveniences. In July 2015, the company started a customer loyalty program in which customers accumulate points during each visit that can be used to redeem rewards, including free food. Pei Wei was among the first restaurant chains to accept Apple Pay, rolling out the technology to all locations in August 2015. Customers can place takeout orders online or through the Pei Wei mobile app, launched in the App Store and Google Play in September 2016 to allow customers to find locations, view the menu, order and pay.

Pei Wei opened their first college campus location in August 2015 on the campus of Arizona State University. Later that year, Pei Wei opened their 200th location in Richardson, Texas in October 2015.

Old Pei Wei logo (2000–2018)

During 2016, Pei Wei withdrew operations in several states, including closing all three of its restaurants in Ohio and all three of its locations in Louisiana.

That same year, the company opened five restaurants in Florida, four in Texas and one in Arkansas.

Pei Wei undertook an extensive rebranding campaign during the same period. The new brand position, designed to tap into the national dining trend toward more healthful eating, included the rollout of quinoa on its menu, as well as the addition of a salad category and several lighter small plate options. In 2016, the company opened its Pei Wei Test Kitchen restaurant in Scottsdale to develop and test new menu items and gather public feedback in real time.

At the end of 2017, Pei Wei announced its separation from its parent company, P.F. Chang's China Bistro. This separation led the company to relocate its headquarters from Scottsdale to Irving, Texas. As a part of their separation from P.F. Chang's, Pei Wei undertook a major rebranding campaign by hiring a new creative agency to revitalize the brand by replacing the company's longtime logo with the new tiger logo and to officially change the trading name of the business to Pei Wei Asian Kitchen in February 2018.

On June 5, 2019, Pei Wei was sold to PWD Acquisition LLC.

== International locations ==
In 2011, Pei Wei announced an agreement with Alsea to open franchise locations in Mexico. The first location in Mexico opened in 2012. Due to lower than expected performance, all Mexico City locations were closed by the end of 2014. All three locations were in Mexico City.

In August 2012, Pei Wei opened its first location in Kuwait, operated by M.H. Alshaya Co. The same franchisee opened the first location in Dubai, U.A.E. in April 2013. By the end of 2014, Pei Wei had five international locations: two locations in Kuwait, and three in the United Arab Emirates.

In September 2016, Pei opened its first East Asian location in South Korea through a partnership with ELX Food & Beverage. The Korean location in Seoul's Starfield Hanam, the country's largest shopping mall, is one of 11 locations that the chain plans to open by the end of 2017.

== See also ==
- List of Chinese restaurants
- P. F. Chang's
