= Milano (cookie) =

Cookie manufactured by Pepperidge Farm

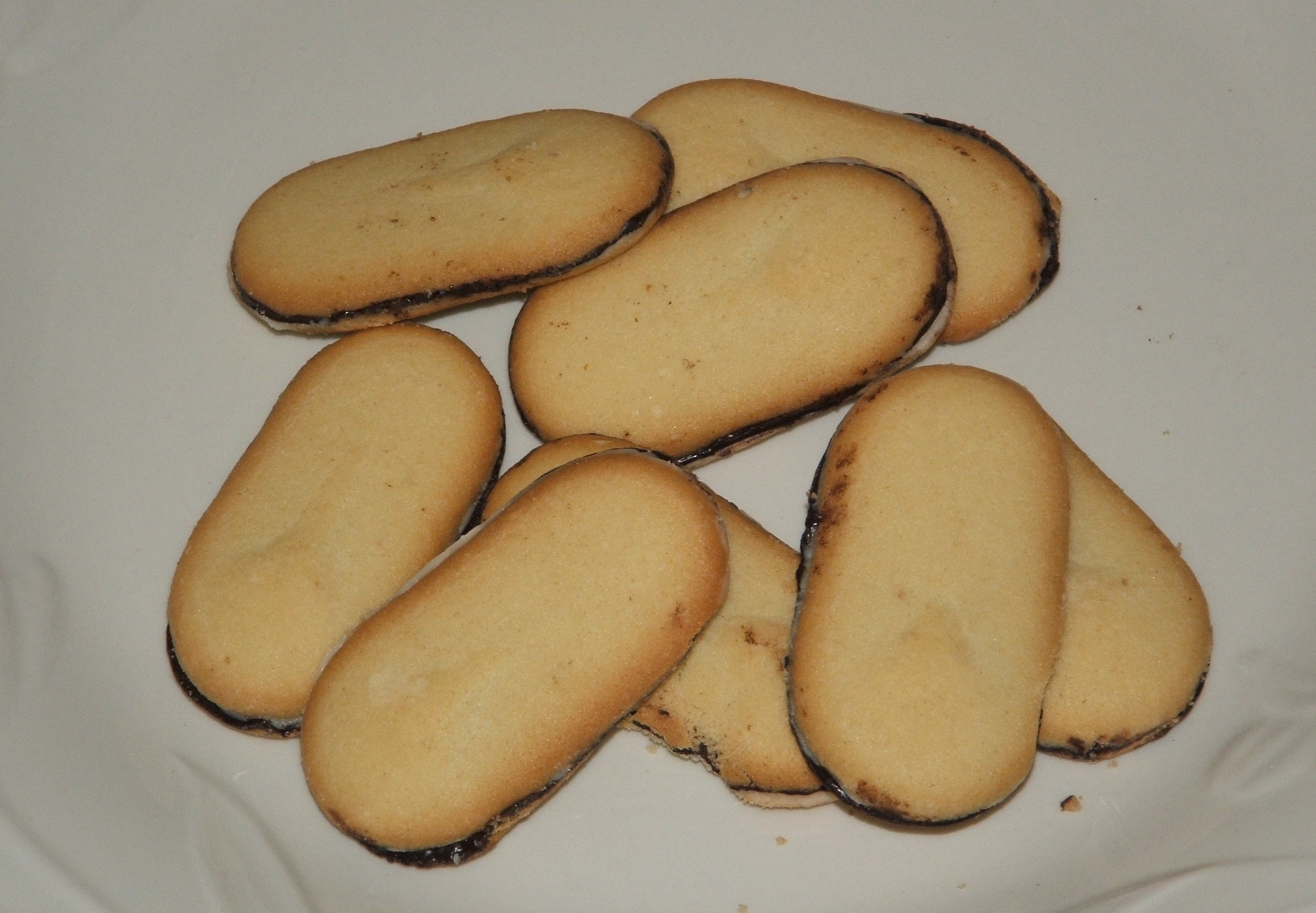
Milano cookies (chocolate mint flavor)

The Milano cookie is a trademarked cookie manufactured by Pepperidge Farm as part of its series of "European" cookies. Each cookie consists of a thin layer of chocolate and, depending on the variety, different flavored filling sandwiched between two biscuit cookies. The cookie is marketed as the Monaco in Canada; local company Milano Bakeries had established prior rights to the "Milano" brand for cookies sold in that country. The Milano was created as a result of Pepperidge Farm's original cookie concept, the Naples, which was a single vanilla wafer cookie topped with dark chocolate.

Many additional varieties are marketed, such as milk chocolate and double chocolate. Other flavors include a layer of mint, sweet orange paste, dulce de leche and lemon in addition to some form of chocolate.

Milano cookies have primarily been marketed as an indulgence food.

Pepperidge Farm took legal action against a single company for an alleged attempt to imitate their cookies in 2015. Milano cookies themselves bear a striking resemblance in taste and composite to langue de chat biscuits found across Europe, Asia, and South America.
