= Cecilia Chiang =

Chinese-American restaurateur and chef (1920–2020)

- 江孫芸
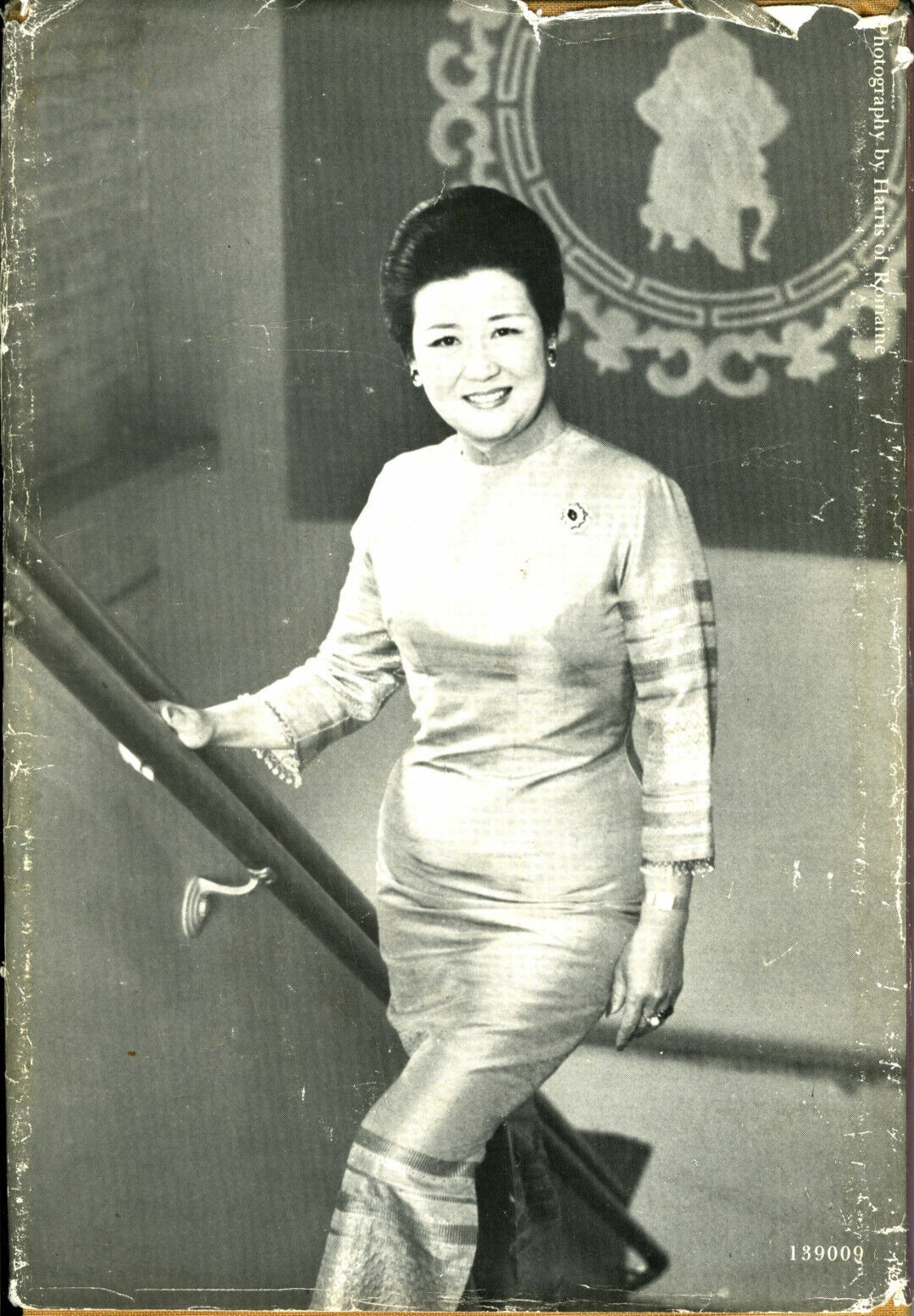
- Chiang c. 1974
- Born: Sun Yun (孫芸); September 18, 1920; Wuxi, Jiangsu, Republic of China
- Died: October 28, 2020 (aged 100); San Francisco, California, U.S.
- Occupations: Restaurateur, chef
- Known for: Mandarin Restaurant
- Spouse: Chiang Liang (江梁)
- Children: Philip Chiang and May Chiang

Cecilia Chiang
- Traditional Chinese: 江孫芸
- Simplified Chinese: 江孙芸
Transcriptions
Standard Mandarin
- Hanyu Pinyin: Jiāng Sūnyún
- Bopomofo: ㄐㄧㄤ ㄙㄨㄣㄩㄣˊ
- Gwoyeu Romatzyh: Jiang Suenyun
- Wade–Giles: Chiang1 Sun1-yün2

Cecilia Sun Yun Chiang (Chinese: 江孫芸; September 18, 1920 – October 28, 2020) was a Chinese-American restaurateur and chef, best known for founding and managing The Mandarin restaurant in San Francisco, California.

== Early life ==
Chiang was born as Sun Yun in Wuxi, Jiangsu, the tenth of twelve children in a wealthy family. Her father, Sun Long Guang, was a railway engineer who was educated in France and her mother, Sun Shueh Yun Hui, was from a wealthy family that owned textile mills and flour mills. Her mother had bound feet, but her parents refused to follow the tradition with their children.

At the age of four, her family moved to Peking (Beijing), where she was raised in a 52-room, converted Ming-era mansion that occupied an entire block. Her Chinese name, Sun Yun, means "flower of the rue". As a child, she enjoyed elaborate formal meals prepared by the family's two chefs, although the children were not allowed to cook or go into the kitchen.

She escaped with a sister from the Japanese occupation of China in 1942 by walking for nearly six months to Chongqing, where they settled with a relative. During her time there, she worked as a Mandarin teacher for the American and Soviet embassies. She met Chiang Liang (江梁), a former economics professor at Fu Jen Catholic University, and by then a successful local businessman whom she married, establishing a comfortable life in Shanghai. There they had two children, May and Philip (江一帆). During the war, she was a spy for America's Office of Strategic Services. She and her husband escaped from China on the last flight from Shanghai during the Chinese Communist Revolution of 1949. With only three tickets for a family of four, they had to leave Philip behind with her sister. The family was reunited with Philip more than a year later.

== Career ==
Chiang settled in Tokyo, Japan, with her husband and children in 1949. She opened a Chinese restaurant, Forbidden City, which was successful with expatriates and local diners.

She later visited San Francisco to visit her sister, whose husband had died. Walking through the streets of San Francisco's Chinatown she met two friends from Tokyo who were planning to open a restaurant in a small space at 2209 Polk Street, and agreed to help negotiate their lease. She wrote a deposit check for $10,000 to secure their rent, which the landlord refused to return after her friends backed out of the venture. Unable to terminate the lease, she decided to run the restaurant by herself.

At the time, non-Chinese Americans in the city had very limited exposure to authentic Northern Chinese cuisine, being familiar with only the Americanized version of Cantonese cuisine. Convinced that residents would enjoy Northern Chinese dishes, but unsure what would appeal to them, she initially listed more than 200 dishes on the menu, including an order of five potstickers for $1. As she began to understand the preferences of Americans, Chiang pared down the menu over time. Avoiding the common elements of American Chinese restaurant decor, she designed the restaurant to evoke the opulence of the palace where she had grown up. After taking out an ad in a Chinese newspaper for a chef, Chiang hired a couple from Shandong to do the cooking, while she washed dishes and went to the market. The restaurant was called The Mandarin and was at first unsuccessful and had few patrons. A Mandarin speaker, she had trouble communicating with the Cantonese speaking suppliers from Chinatown, who would not extend her credit, and also faced discrimination as a woman business owner. The location had no parking, which Chiang cites as a difficulty, and she could not get an ABC license to serve cocktails because she was not a permanent resident.

However, over time, The Mandarin began to attract loyal customers. Journalist C. Y. Lee, who had just written The Flower Drum Song, about San Francisco's Forbidden City Nightclub, became a regular and brought many friends. One day, Vic Bergeron (founder of Trader Vic's) came to the restaurant with Herb Caen, who immediately began to popularize the restaurant in his newspaper column. With the restaurant's new, overnight success, Chiang decided to remain in San Francisco. She separated from her husband (they never divorced) and brought her two children, May and Philip, to live with her in Saint Francis Wood. She was the first non-white resident of the neighborhood, and was admitted by the homeowner association only after they learned that she was from an upper-class background in China. In 1968, she relocated the restaurant to a 300-seat location in Ghirardelli Square, which required a multimillion-dollar investment. Chiang was known for entertaining VIP guests in the dining room, wearing fancy gowns and expensive jewelry. The San Francisco Culinary Workers' Union called the location a "sweatshop", which prompted Chiang to sue them for libel. She won the suit in the late 1970s.

Chiang opened a second Mandarin in Beverly Hills, California, in 1975. She handed over control of that restaurant to her son Philip in the 1980s.

Chiang sold The Mandarin in 1991, and it closed in 2006.

== Influences ==
Chiang is often credited with having introduced San Francisco, and the United States, to a more authentic version of Mandarin cuisine. Saveur credited Chiang with "introducing regional Chinese cooking to America."

Chuck Williams of Williams Sonoma, who enjoyed the Mandarin's "beggar's chicken" dish (a whole stuffed chicken), introduced James Beard, who became a friend and learned about northern Chinese cuisine from Chiang. Alice Waters, who had just opened Chez Panisse in Berkeley, California, learned Chinese cooking from Chiang, and the two became lifelong friends. Waters said that what Chiang did to popularize Chinese cuisine in America is what Julia Child (whom Chiang also taught) did for French cuisine. Waters, Chiang, and Marion Cunningham took a several-month tour of Europe in 1978 to sample as many of the best restaurants as they could. George Chen, a founder of the city's Betelenut and Shanghai 1930 (now closed, as are his other ventures, Long Life Noodle Co. and Xanadu), waited tables for Chiang at the Mandarin in the 1970s. Others who were influenced by Chiang include Jeremiah Tower, and the food editor of Sunset Magazine.

In a panel hosted by Colin McEnroe, in response to a question from an audience member, Alice Waters said that she wanted her last meal on earth to be shark fin soup cooked by Chiang. The comment became a viral sensation, eventually leading the Humane Society International to obtain a pledge from Waters that she would never again eat the dish.

== Honors and recognition ==
In 2013, Chiang won a James Beard Foundation Award for lifetime achievement.

In 2014, filmmaker Wayne Wang's Soul of a Banquet documentary, which looks at Chiang's life as she prepares for her lifelong friend Alice Waters' 40th restaurant anniversary, was released. Wayne Wang first visited The Mandarin in the early '80s. Her restaurant, The Mandarin, was included in the food scholar Paul Freedman's historical survey, "Ten Restaurants that Changed America" (2016). In July 2016, a six part cooking series, The Kitchen Wisdom of Cecilia Chiang was released on PBS.

== Personal life ==
Chiang was married to Chiang Liang (江梁), a professor of economics and later a successful local businessman, whom she married in Shanghai. They had two children, May and Philip (江一帆), the latter of whom is a co-founder of the restaurant chain P.F. Chang's.

Having lived for many years in San Francisco, she moved to Belvedere in Marin County, after selling her restaurant in 1991. She moved back to San Francisco in 2011 where her daughter May and grandchild Alisa Ongbhaibulya live. Following her retirement in 1990, Chiang remained active in promoting charitable causes, in particular, the Chinese American International School.

Chiang died on October 28, 2020, in San Francisco at the age of 100.

== Bibliography ==
- Cecilia Chiang, with Allan Carr (1974). The Mandarin Way. California Living Books. ISBN 978-0-89395-062-0. (Chiang has said she omitted a number of details from this early memoir so as not to endanger relatives who remained in Communist China)
- Cecilia Sun Yun Chiang. Madame Chiang's Mandarin recipe book. International Paper Co., Long-Bell Division.
- Cecilia Chiang, with Lisa Weiss (2007). The Seventh Daughter: My Culinary Journey from Beijing to San Francisco. Ten Speed Press. ISBN 978-1-58008-822-0. (nominated for a 2008 James Beard Award)
