= Culture of Yorkshire =

Culture of English county

Historic county symbols of Yorkshire
- Flag of Yorkshire

- Emblem: Yorkshire rose
- Food: Yorkshire Pudding
- Sport: Yorkshire football team; Yorkshire CCC; Yorkshire RFU
- Sweet: Parkin; Pontefract cakes

The culture of Yorkshire has developed over the county's history, influenced by the cultures of those who came to control/settle in the region, including the Celts (Brigantes and Parisii), Romans, Angles, Vikings, Normans Yorkshire people are said to have a strong sense of regional identity, and are sometimes thought to identify more strongly with Yorkshire than England, or the UK as a whole. Despite the decline of many traditional and distinctive features of the Yorkshire dialect, its accent is widely perceived as trustworthy and friendly.

According to a genetic study published in Nature (19 March 2015), the local population of West Yorkshire is genetically distinct from the rest of the population of Yorkshire.

The 2015 Oxford University study compared the current genetic distribution in Britain to the geographical maps of its historic Kingdoms, and found that the distinct West Yorkshire genetic cluster closely corresponds to Elmet's known territories. This suggests Yorkshire may have maintained a regional Celtic identity through the centuries.

== Traditions and stereotypes ==
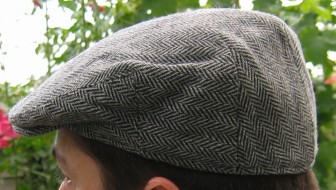
A flat cap associated with the stereotypical Yorkshireman

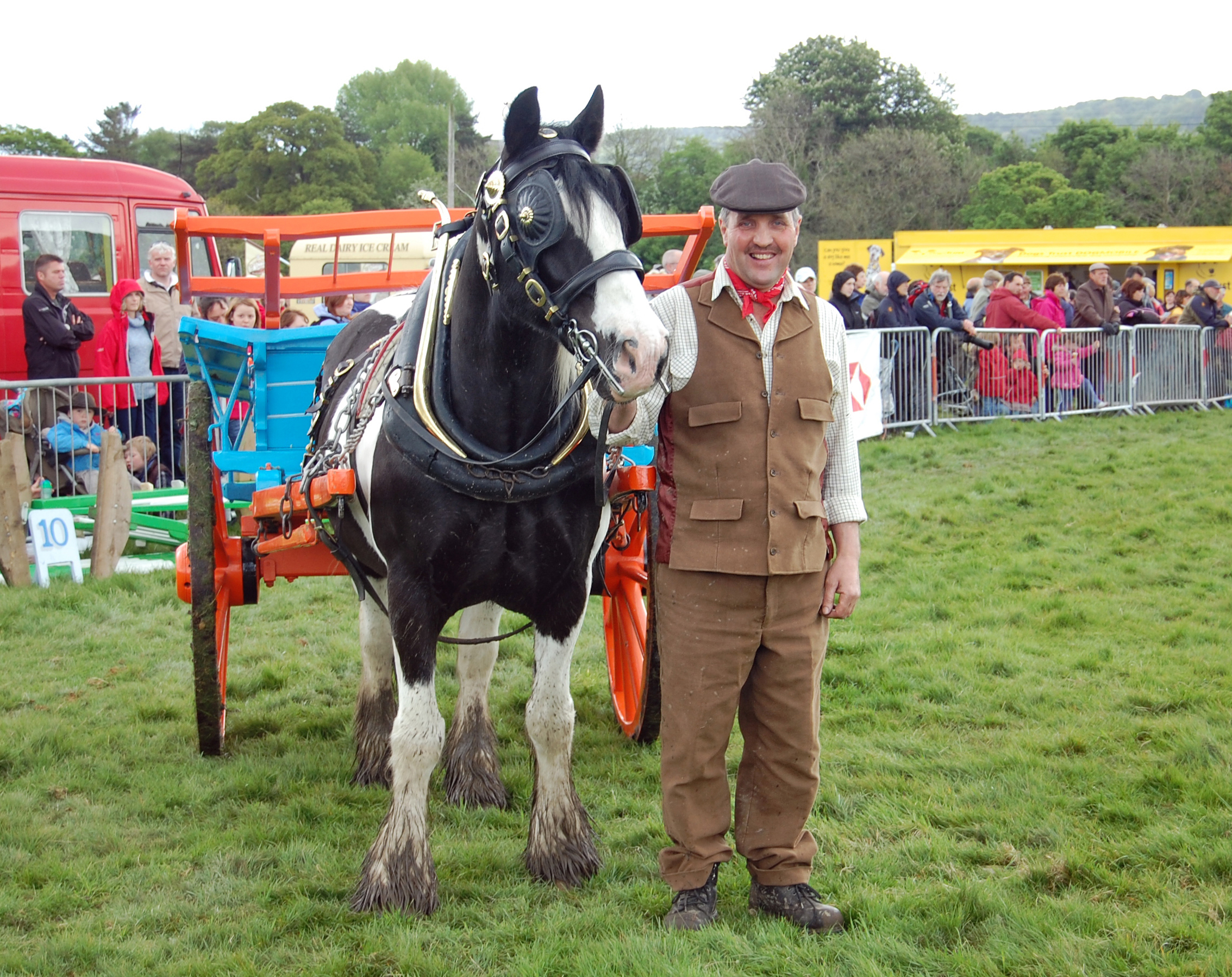
Mr Pack dressed in traditional Yorkshire attire takes his horse, Danny, for a turn of the field in front of the crowd at Otley Show.

Many Yorkshire people are immensely proud of both their county and their identity, embracing the popular nickname of God's Own Country, which appears on mugs and tea towels and used by the writer Nigel Farndale, himself a Yorkshireman, as a headline in a special Yorkshire edition of Country Life magazine in 1995.

The most common stereotype of a Yorkshire person is as tight with money: there is a British saying that "a Yorkshireman is a Scotsman with all the generosity squeezed out of him", which references how Scots are also stereotyped as being tight but not as tight as Yorkshire folk. This stereotype can also be seen in the Yorkshireman's Motto:

'Ear all, see all, say nowt;
Eyt all, sup all, pay nowt;
And if ivver tha does owt fer nowt –
Allus do it fer thissen.

Translation: "Hear all, see all, say nothing; Eat all, drink all, pay nothing; And if ever you do anything for nothing – always do it for yourself."

Yorkshire people are often stereotyped as friendly but "bloody-minded", stubborn (also known as "Yorkshire-stubborn") and argumentative. Indeed, throughout the history of the area, this has been noted, dating from the Celt Brigantes, Norse Viking settlement, through the Norman period, the Wars of the Roses, the Pilgrimage of Grace during Henry VIII's Dissolution of the Monasteries, to the 1984 Miner's Strike; The region has seen a number of rebellions against non-Yorkshire or non-Northern rulers.

It is this stereotype which is referred to in the saying "Yo can allus tell a Yorkshireman, but yo can't tell him mich" ("you can always tell a Yorkshireman, but you can't tell him much"). However, the popular understanding of the Wars of the Roses is mostly false. The House of York had its support mostly in southern England, while northern England on either side of the Pennines mainly supported the House of Lancaster. Indeed, the city of York itself was a Lancastrian power base.

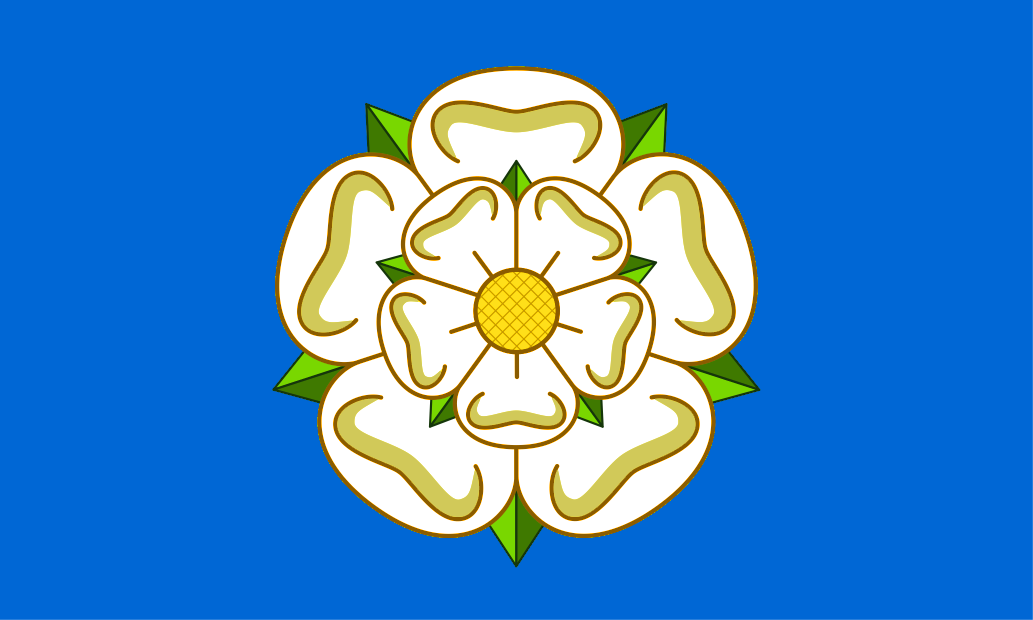
Yorkshire is often described as "God's own county/country" due to its beautiful landscape and unspoiled countryside

One social stereotype of a Yorkshireman had a tendency to include such accessories as a flat cap and a whippet; this alludes to rural life. While the stereotype might not always ring true, the county certainly has an illustrious rural history; many of the now prominent West Yorkshire cities grew thanks in part to the wool industry. Another stereotype often heard in connection with Yorkshire workers is the proverb "wheer ther's muck, ther's brass" ("where there's muck, there's money"); this refers to the widely held view that where one is willing to do unpalatable work, there is plenty of money to be made.

Tyke or Yorkie is now a colloquialism used to identify the Yorkshire dialect, as well as the term some Yorkshiremen affectionately use to describe themselves, especially in the West Riding. Originally "tyke" was a highly derogatory word, meaning "a crude uncouth ill-bred person lacking culture or refinement"; southerners used the term against Yorkshiremen, but in defiance of the negative connotations it was adopted locally, taking on a new life.

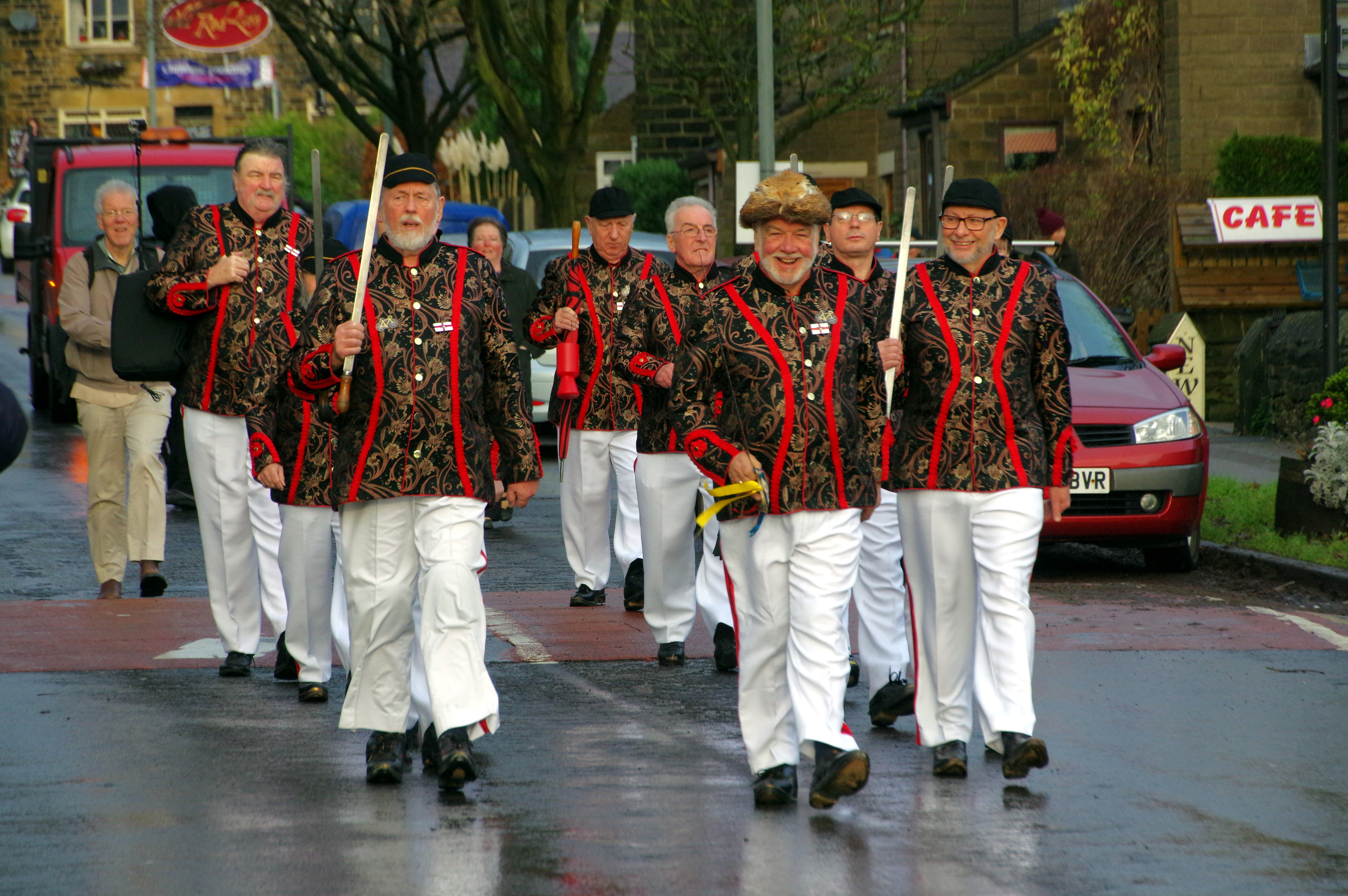
Long Sword dancers

Among Yorkshire's unique traditions is the Long Sword dance, a traditional dance not found elsewhere in England. The most famous song of Yorkshire is On Ilkla Moor Baht 'at ("On Ilkley Moor without a hat"); it is considered the unofficial anthem of the county. In celebration of its culture, Yorkshire Day has been celebrated annually on 1 August since 1975. Amongst the celebrations is a civic gathering of Lord Mayors, Mayors and other civic heads from across the county, convened by the Yorkshire Society.

== Food and drink ==
The cuisine of Yorkshire and that of Northern England in general is known for its rich ingredients, especially in sweet dishes.

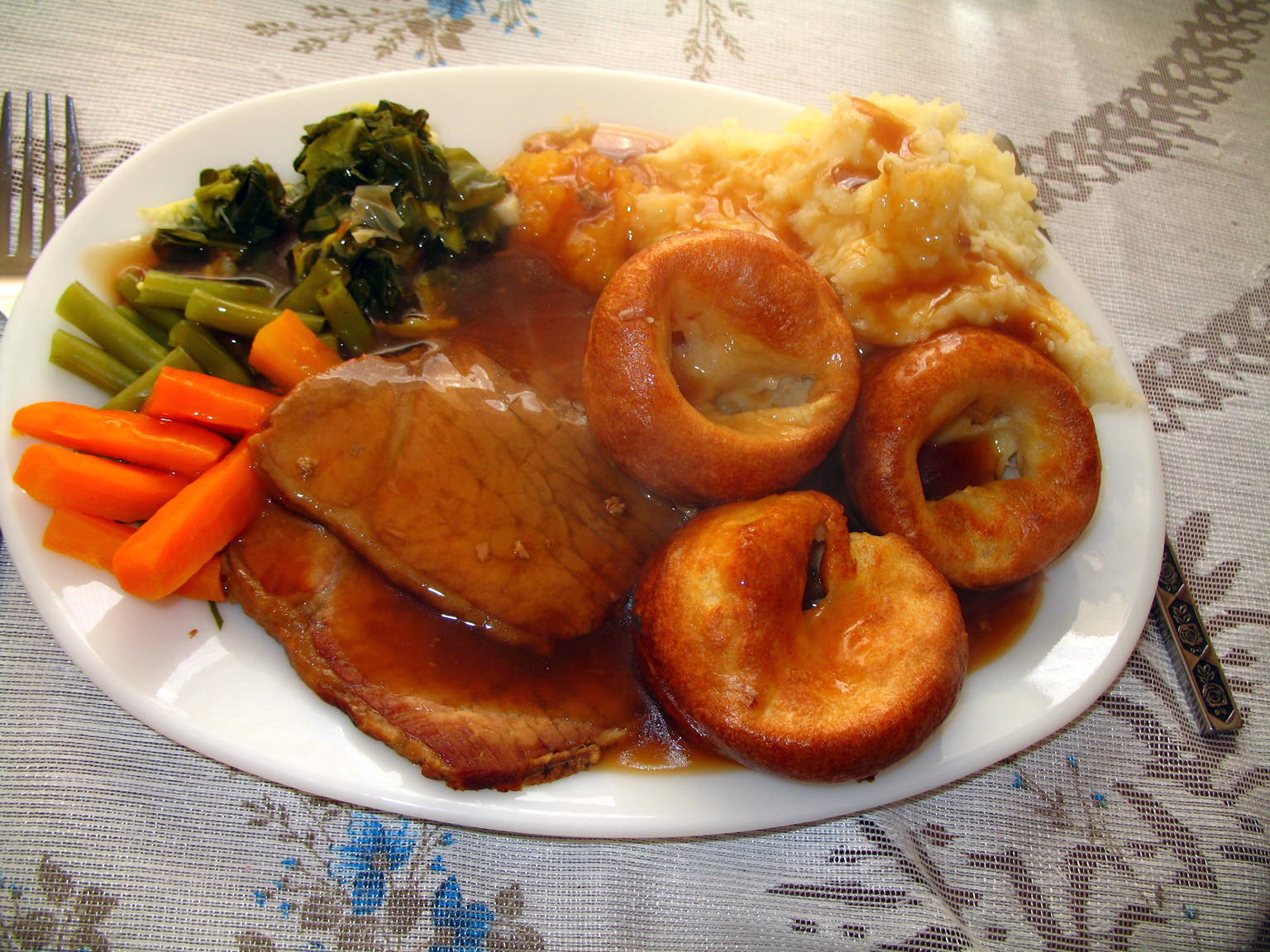
Yorkshire puddings, served as part of a traditional Sunday roast.

Yorkshire gave its name to the Yorkshire pudding. It is commonly made from a savoury batter-mix and served with roast beef, vegetables, potatoes and gravy to form part of a Sunday roast, which itself developed from the county. It is tradition for it to eaten before the main meal as a starter – the idea being that you would then not want to eat as much of the more expensive meat. Typically a single pud varies in size from filling a saucer to a dinner plate. It an also be served as a savoury dish with onions and herbs as part of the mix or as part of a sweet dish with jam.

Wensleydale cheese is a associated with the local pastures of Wensleydale which give the cheese the distinct flavour. Fine Fettle Yorkshire and Swaledale cheese are also local Yorkshire derived cheeses.

Yorkshire is also a historic centre for the brewing of beer, with breweries such as Tetley's, John Smith's, Sam Smith's, Black Sheep, Wards Brewing Company, Stones Theakston, Timothy Taylor and Copper Dragon.

=== Sweet ===
Ginger beer is commonly a soft drink, flavoured with ginger, which existed since the mid-1700s. A Parkin is a sweet ginger cake which is different from standard ginger cakes in that it includes oatmeal and treacle as part of the traditional recipe. Yorkshire has a form of gingerbread which has a layer of crystallised ginger in the middle, rather than an essence of ginger or ginger shavings.

The Yorkshire curd tart a curd tart recipe which has been around since at least the 1750s, unique because of its use of rosewater.

The Yorkshire Rhubarb Triangle is a 9-square-mile (23 km^{2}) triangle in West Yorkshire, between Wakefield, Morley and Rothwell, famous for producing early forced rhubarb which is harvested by candlelight. In February 2010, Yorkshire Forced Rhubarb was awarded Protected Designation of Origin status under the European Commission's Protected Food Name scheme after being recommended by the Department for Environment, Food and Rural Affairs, (Defra).

Liquorice, is a plant thought to have been brought over to Yorkshire by returning Crusaders or Dominican friars in the 14th century. It became synonymous with Pontefract in Yorkshire,

=== Confection ===
A local Pontefract man George Dunhill in the 1760s thought to mix liquorice with sugar, creating what was known locally as "Pomfret cakes", but is now well known as "liquorice". As liquorice requires deep soil to grow, it was mainly grown in Pontefract. Although it is no longer grown in the area, Pontefract has two large liquorice confectionery derived factories as a legacy.

From the 1700s onwards, Yorkshire (in particular the city of York) saw the growth of several chocolate and general confection factories or companies, forming an important part of now with globally known products. These include:

- Nestle (Switzerland) owned:
  - Mackintosh's (Quality Street continues to be produced in Halifax) – makers of toffee.
  - Rowntree's (continues to be of York, repurposed as a jelly sweet confection brand) – has produced Kit Kat, Smarties, Aero, Fruit Pastilles, Black Magic and Polo.
- Valeo Confectionery (Ireland, confection produced in Leeds) – current makers of York Fruits (originally of Pontefract).
- Ferrero (Italy) owned and brand remain in use:
  - Terry's (formerly of York) – produced Terry's Chocolate Orange, Neapolitans and Terry's All Gold.
  - Thorntons (formerly of Sheffield) – involved in the field of luxury chocolate such as chocolate truffles.
- Bassett's (continues to be produced in Sheffield under the name Maynards Bassetts, owned by Mondelez) – accidental inventors of liquorice allsorts in 1899.
- Simpkins– manufactures the world's first Airtight Glucose Travel Tin Sweets.

== Sport ==
Yorkshire has played a highly important role in the development of sports, some forms of which have become world-famous. Sport is important in the modern culture of the county. The main sports are football, cricket and rugby league.

In the London 2012 Olympics, competitors from Yorkshire won 7 gold medals, 2 silver and 3 bronze. If Yorkshire had been treated as a country it would have come twelfth in the overall medal table.

=== Cricket ===
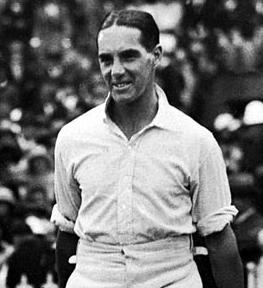
Herbert Sutcliffe, batsman.

Yorkshire County Cricket Club represents the historic county at first-class cricket. It competes in the County Championship against 17 others, playing at their home ground of Headingley, Leeds. and occasionally North Marine Road Ground, Scarborough, Yorkshire is by far the most successful in the history of the championship: they have won the title 32 times (outright). Their nearest competitor in titles achieved is Surrey, who have won it 19 times (outright). They participate in a derby with Lancashire County Cricket Club known as the Roses Match, named after the Wars of the Roses.

The first cricket club in Yorkshire is thought to have been Sheffield Cricket Club, founded in 1751. Some players from Yorkshire have been highly acclaimed in the general history of the sport, including Herbert Sutcliffe, Sir Leonard Hutton, Wilfred Rhodes, George Herbert Hirst, Fred Trueman and Geoffrey Boycott. Aside from the county club and its achievements, Yorkshiremen have also made a distinct mark on cricket in general: Thomas Lord founded Lord's Cricket Ground in London. As for umpires, the man regarded as the most famous and a figure synonymous with cricket, Dickie Bird, is from Barnsley.

=== Football ===
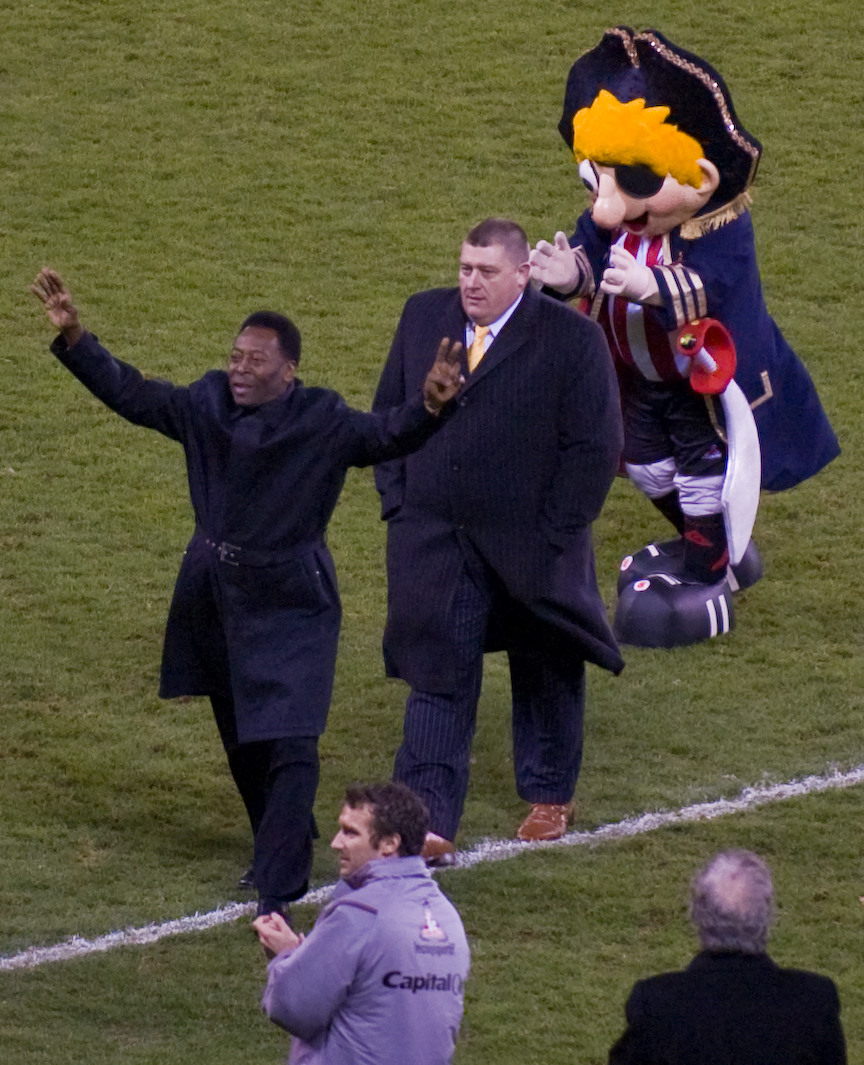
Brazilian legend Pelé (left) in Sheffield in November 2017, marking the 150th anniversary of the world's oldest football club, Sheffield F.C.

Yorkshire is officially recognised by FIFA as the birthplace of club football, as Sheffield F.C. who were founded in 1857 are certified as the oldest association football club in the world. South Yorkshire hosted the first ever inter-club match and the first ever local derby on 26 December 1860; between Sheffield FC and Hallam FC. South Yorkshire is also home to what is recognised by the Guinness Book of Records as the Oldest Ground in the World, Sandygate Road. The Sheffield rules code was highly influential to the development of the FA's Laws of the Game, which is now the worldwide standard code for the game and happened to be drafted by Ebenezer Cobb Morley from Hull.

In 1961 Rotherham United played in the first League Cup Final, when they lost 3–2 to Aston Villa in two legs, they won the first 2–0, but lost the second 3–0. Yorkshire clubs compete in the English football league system. While they are by no means the most dominant footballing county, Yorkshire has produced several national league winners, some of whom have won the title more than once, including Sheffield Wednesday, Leeds United, Huddersfield Town and Sheffield United. Some players from Yorkshire have gone on to become some of the most highly regarded in the history of the game, including World Cup-winning goalkeeper Gordon Banks and two time European Footballer of the Year award winner Kevin Keegan.

=== Rugby ===
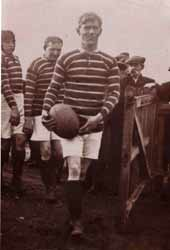
Harold Wagstaff – Prince of the Centres.

Originally Yorkshire clubs formed part of the Rugby Football Union which covered all of England under the same code. They took part in competitions such as the Yorkshire Cup. The sport was popular amongst the working class of the North, whilst in the South it was a middle-class man's game. This was a problem in the pre-professional era for the Yorkshire clubs, as the working class were limited by the need to earn a wage and did not have as much recreational time; it was against the rules for clubs to pay players.

In 1895 the rugby schism took place, creating the sport of rugby league in Huddersfield, West Riding of Yorkshire. The association they founded is still based in the North and is known as the Rugby Football League. Although some Yorkshire clubs now play rugby union, Rugby League is the main rugby focus for the county; of the 24 clubs who have competed in the Super League, 11 are from Yorkshire.

The five most decorated Yorkshire clubs in terms of league titles are Huddersfield Giants, Hull FC, Bradford Bulls, Hull Kingston Rovers and Leeds Rhinos. In total, six Yorkshiremen have been inducted into the British Rugby League Hall of Fame: Harold Wagstaff, Jonty Parkin, Roger Millward, Neil Fox, Billy Batten and Ellery Hanley.

=== Ferret legging ===
The origin of ferret legging is disputed. The sport seems to have become popular among coal miners in Yorkshire, England, in the 1970s, though some Scots claim it gained popularity in Scotland. According to Marlene Blackburn of the Richmond Ferret Rescue League, ferret legging originated in public houses "where patrons would bet on who could keep a ferret in his pants the longest." The sport may alternatively have originated during the time when only the relatively wealthy in England were allowed to keep ferrets used for hunting, forcing the animal poachers to hide their illicit ferrets in their trousers to avoid detection by gamekeepers. This was also done by poachers and hunters to keep the animals warm in the cold weather.

Retired miner Reg Mellor, from Barnsley, set the new world record time of five hours and twenty-six minutes on 5 July 1981 at the Annual Pennine Show at Holmfirth, Yorkshire. He had practised the sport since his youth, but had received no recognition until he set the new world record. Mellor, who had hunted with ferrets in the dales outside of Barnsley for many years, had grown accustomed to keeping them in his trousers to keep them warm and dry when out working in the rain. Mellor's "trick" was to ensure that the ferrets were well-fed before they were inserted into his trousers.

In 1986, Mellor attempted to break his own record before a crowd of 2,500 spectators, intending to beat the "magic six-hour mark—the four-minute mile of ferret legging". After five hours, most of the attendees had become bored and left; workmen arrived to dismantle the stage, despite Mellor's protests that he was on his way to a new record. According to Adrian Tame of the Sunday Herald Sun, Mellor retired after that experience, "disillusioned and broken-hearted", but with his dignity and manhood intact. Mellor had hoped to organise an annual national competition held in his home town of Barnsley, and offered a prize of £100 to anyone who could beat him.

=== Others ===
In other sports, people from that county have also had success. "Prince" Naseem Hamed from Sheffield, was one of the most famous boxers of the 1990s; he won world championships in the Bantamweight (EBU) and Featherweight (IBF, IBO, WBC and WBO) divisions.

Yorkshire has produced several noted athletes; 100-metre runner Dorothy Hyman won three gold medals in the Commonwealth Games and one in the European Athletics Championships, middle-distance runner Peter Elliott also won gold at the Commonwealth Games. Adrian Moorhouse was a gold medal-winning Olympian in swimming, earning victory at the 1988 Summer Olympics, he also won gold at three European Championships and three Commonwealth Games.

Yorkshire hosted the grand depart of the 2014 Tour de France. The county has produced many successful racing cyclists over the years. Notable male cyclists include Brian Robinson, the first British rider to finish and to win stages of the Tour de France, Barry Hoban, winner of eight Tour de France stages and two stages of the Vuelta a España, Malcolm Elliott, winner of the points classification at the 1989 Vuelta a España, Ed Clancy, a double Olympic and five time World Championship gold medallist on the track and Ben Swift, also a track cycling World Champion. Successful female cyclists include Beryl Burton, a double road cycling and five time track cycling World Champion, former individual pursuit World Champion Yvonne McGregor and World Championship track gold medallist and Olympic road racing silver medallist Lizzie Armitstead.

== Literature ==
There are several instances of the county providing an important role in literature. Perhaps the most famous literacy association is that between Whitby in North Yorkshire and Bram Stoker's Dracula. When Stoker wrote the novel, he lived in Whitby, and parts of the novel are set there. It includes several stories of Whitby folklore such as the beaching of the Russian ship Dmitri, which became the basis of Demeter in the book. Today there is a Dracula Museum in the town, celebrating the association. In terms of poetry, one of the best known from Yorkshire is Andrew Marvell from Winestead-in-Holderness, he was noted for writing metaphysical poetry during the 1600s, and his association with several other noted British poets from the era.

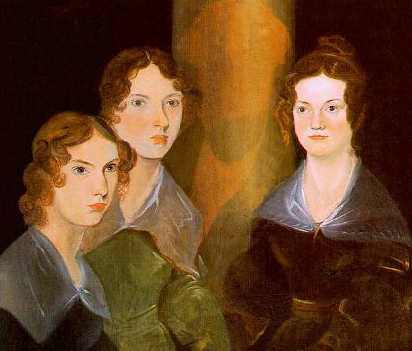
The Brontë sisters

Then music, the mosaic of the air,
Did of all these a solemn noise prepare;
With which she gain'd the empire of the ear,
Including all between the earth and sphere.

— Andrew Marvell, "Music's Empire"

The Brontë sisters – Anne, Charlotte and Emily—were all Yorkshirewomen born in Thornton and raised in Haworth, West Yorkshire. Their novels, written in the mid-1800s, caused a sensation when they were first published and were subsequently accepted into the canon of great English literature. Amongst the most noted novels credited to the sisters are Anne's The Tenant of Wildfell Hall, Charlotte's Jane Eyre and Emily's Wuthering Heights.

Ted Hughes wrote two collections that show his love for Yorkshire: Remains of Elmet (1979) and Elmet (1994), in which the ghost of Emily Brontë still haunts the moor.

In the present day, the most prominent Yorkshire presences in English literature are the playwright, author, actor, screenwriter and commentator Alan Bennett, born 1934 in Leeds, where much of his work is set, and the poet, playwright and screenwriter Tony Harrison, born three years later in the same city.

== Music ==
=== Folk music ===
Yorkshire has a rich heritage of folk music and folk dance including particularly Long Sword dance. Folk songs were collected in the region from the 19th century, and it probably had more attention than other Northern counties, but its rich heritage of industrial folk song was relatively neglected. It was not until the second folk revival in the 1950s that Nigel and Mary Hudleston began to attempt to redress the balance, collecting a large number of Yorkshire songs between 1958 and 1978.

Yorkshire folk song is often described as lacking the highly distinctive instrumental traditions found in areas such as Northumbria, although bagpipes such as pastoral pipes were recorded in the region, these appear to have died out during the 19th century.Alongside this, the Yorkshire fiddle playing has been described as occupying an intermediate position between the Northumbrian tradition and more Southern English/Midlands styles.

The tradition has chiefly associated with the use of dialect, particularly in the West Riding, as exemplified by the song On Ilkla Moor Baht 'at, probably written in the later 19th century and using a Kent folk tune (almost certainly borrowed via a Methodist hymnal), but widely regarded as an unofficial Yorkshire anthem. Many Yorkshire folk songs were not entirely unique in origin, reflecting a broader pattern of melodic adaptation common across British and European folk traditions, as with probably the most commercially successful Yorkshire song, Scarborough Fair recorded by Simon & Garfunkel, which was a version of the Scottish ballad 'The Elfin Knight'. One unusual piece of music is the unique choral folk song, probably derived from an 18th-century ballad, known as the Holmfirth Anthem or Pratty Flowers.

The most eminent folk performers from the county are the Watersons from Hull, who began recording Yorkshire versions of folk songs from 1965, and members of which are still performing today. Also famous is the Leeds-born musician Jake Thackray, who became famous in the 1970s for singing witty, often bawdy songs, many of which related to rural Yorkshire life, in a style derived from the French chansonnier tradition. His work led him to be described by some as the "Northern Noël Coward". Other Yorkshire folk musicians include Heather Wood (b. 1945) of the Young Tradition, the short-lived electric folk group Mr. Fox (1970–2), The Deighton Family, Julie Matthews, Kathryn Roberts, and the Mercury Prize nominated Kate Rusby.

Yorkshire has a flourishing folk music culture, with over forty folk clubs and thirty annual folk music festivals. In 2007 the Yorkshire Garland Group was formed to make Yorkshire folk songs accessible online and in schools. The Dales Traditional Music and Dance Collective is a Yorkshire-based folk revival organisation dedicated to preserving and reviving the traditional music, dance and social customs of the Yorkshire Dales through workshops, performances and educational projects. The modern revival of Dales dance traditions grew significantly following the publication of Bob Ellis’s 2020 collection There was None of this Lazy Dancing!: Folk Tunes and Dances from the Yorkshire Dales, which documented surviving local tunes, step dances and customs.

=== Rock and pop music ===
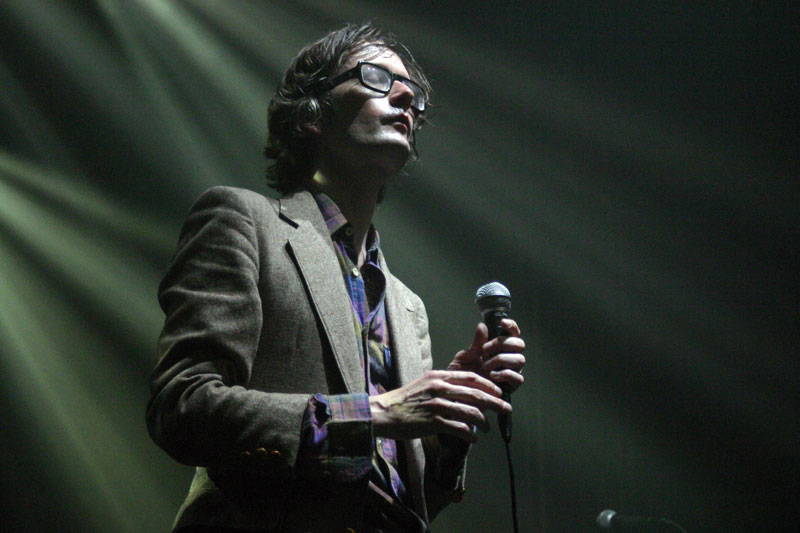
Jarvis Cocker, singer for Pulp

Yorkshire has played a significant part in popular music, starting with the unconventional Arthur Brown in the 1960s. During the following decade David Bowie, himself of a father from Tadcaster in North Yorkshire, hired three musicians from Hull in the form of Mick Ronson, Trevor Bolder and Mick Woodmansey; together they recorded Ziggy Stardust and the Spiders from Mars, an album that went on to become highly regarded.

Perhaps the most significant time for Yorkshire music in the modern era was the local post-punk scene of the 1980s, where the county produced several significant bands who went on to achieve success, including the Sisters of Mercy, the Cult, Gang of Four, the Human League, Def Leppard, Heaven 17, New Model Army, Soft Cell, Chumbawamba, the Wedding Present, the Mission, the Housemartins, the Beautiful South and the Comsat Angels.

Influenced by the local post punk scene, but also by international extreme metal acts such as Celtic Frost, Candlemass, and Kreator, Yorkshire-based bands Paradise Lost and My Dying Bride laid the foundations of what would become the Gothic Metal genre in the early to mid-1990s.

Pulp from Sheffield had a massive hit in the form of "Common People" during 1995, a song focusing on working-class northern England life. The 2000s saw popularity for indie rock and post-punk revival bands from the area with the Kaiser Chiefs and the Arctic Monkeys, the latter holding the record for the fastest-selling debut album in British music history with Whatever People Say I Am, That's What I'm Not.

Yorkshire has also contributed heavily to the emergence of the electronic music industry from the 1990s until the present day. The nightclubs of Leeds and Sheffield helped to build the foundations for record labels such as Warp Records. The region has also been influential in the development of bassline, producing a huge hit with T2's "Heartbroken" in 2007, and has produced grime crews such as Scumfam. Music in these and related genres has been championed by Toddla T, a Sheffield-born DJ formerly on BBC radio.

== Art ==
Particularly notable international artists from Yorkshire included Henry Moore (sculptor) and David Hockney (painter). In 1925, the Fylingdales Group of Artists was founded at Denton Hawley's studio in Robin Hood's Bay. See also a list of artists and sculptors from Yorkshire.

== Film and television ==
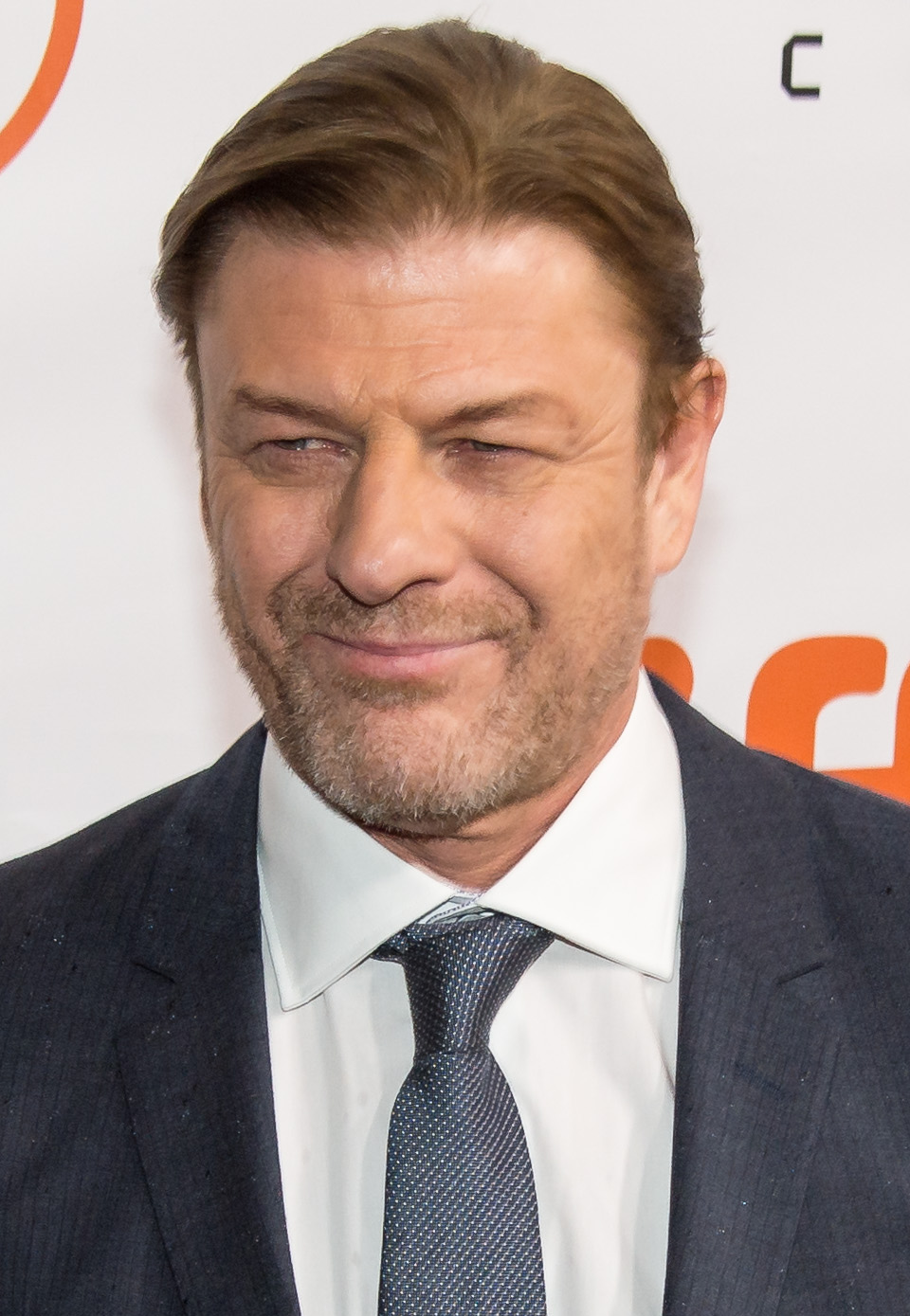
Sean Bean's Yorkshire accent is highly recognised and is utilised on many of his castings including Game of Thrones Stark accent.

Three prominent British television shows filmed in (and based around) Yorkshire are sitcom Last of the Summer Wine, drama series Heartbeat and Emmerdale, the latter two of which were produced by Yorkshire Television before it was absorbed into ITV plc. All Creatures Great and Small, based on books by James Herriot, was set in Yorkshire and exterior shots were filmed there. The television drama Downton Abbey, although set in Yorkshire, is actually filmed in Berkshire and at Ealing Studios, London. Last of the Summer Wine, in particular, is noted for holding the record of longest-running comedy series in the world, from 1973 until 2010. Open All Hours and its continuation Still Open All Hours are set and filmed in Doncaster.

Several noted films are set in Yorkshire, including Kes, Four Lions, This Sporting Life, Calendar Girls, God's Own Country and Room at the Top. A comedy film set in Sheffield named The Full Monty, won an Academy Award and was voted the second best British film of all time in a 2007 poll by Radio Times. Threads, a docu-drama about nuclear winter, was set and filmed in Sheffield. The county is also referenced in Monty Python's The Meaning of Life during a segment on birth where title card read, "The Miracle of Birth, Part II – The Third World". The scene then opened into a mill town street, subtitled "Yorkshire". Monty Python were also known to perform the "Four Yorkshiremen sketch" live, which first featured on At Last the 1948 Show.

== See also ==
- List of people from Yorkshire
