= South Bank, York =

Suburb of York, North Yorkshire, England

Coordinates: 53.946444°N 1.086056°W

South Bank
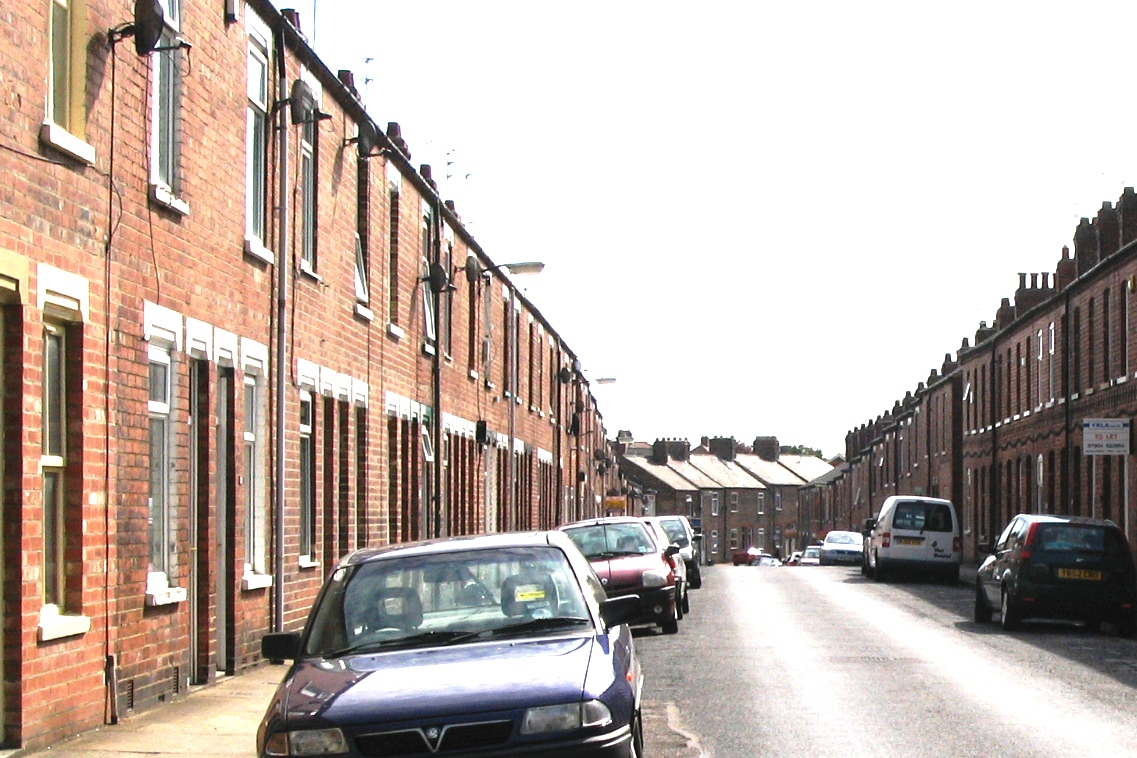
- A street in South Bank

- Location within North Yorkshire
- OS grid reference: SE598501
- Unitary authority: York
- Ceremonial county: North Yorkshire
- Region: Yorkshire and the Humber
- Country: England
- Sovereign state: United Kingdom
- Post town: York
- Postcode district: YO23 1
- Dialling code: 01904
- Police: North Yorkshire
- Fire: North Yorkshire
- Ambulance: Yorkshire
- UK Parliament: York Central

South Bank is a suburb in the city of York, North Yorkshire, England. It is to the south of the River Ouse. It was home to the now-closed Terry's Chocolate Works.

== History ==
The area was once part of the ancient parish of Clementhorpe, and was part of their ecclesiastical parish until 1928. In the 19th century housing developments created what is known as South Bank today, to serve the industry that had sprouted alongside the River Ouse in Clementhorpe, such as Terry's and Henry Richardson & Company's fertiliser works. From 1913 to 1935, an electric tramway was run by York Corporation Tramways from York railway station to South Bank. In the 1930s, Nunthorpe estate was built on the border between South Bank and Clementhorpe, but during the war Nunthorpe Grove became known as the most ill-fated road in York, with not just German bombs dropping on the road. On 5 March 1945, a Handley Page Halifax on its way to bomb Chemnitz, crashed after it was iced up, demolishing Nos 26 and 28 and killing a total of 11 people.

=== Terry's Chocolate Works ===
The Chocolate Works factory opened in 1926, on what was open countryside, where over the years it manufactured Terry's Chocolate Orange, Terry's All Gold and York Fruits amongst others. Terry's was acquired by Kraft Foods in 1993, who decided in 2004 to switch production of remaining products All Gold and Chocolate Orange to factories in Belgium, Sweden, Poland and Slovakia, and close the plant. The factory closed on 30 September 2005, with the loss of 317 jobs. It has since been converted into a mixed-use residential/commercial real estate development.

== Geography ==
South Bank is situated in between Knavesmire and Scarcroft allotments to the West, and by Clementhorpe to the east and north along Bishopthorpe Road and Scarcroft Road. To the south is Middlethorpe and Bishopthorpe.

== Governance ==
South Bank is part of the parliamentary constituency of York Central, with the current MP being Rachael Maskell who has held the seat since 2015.

Locally, the suburb has been served by the City of York Council, a Unitary authority, since 2015. Since 2024, the suburb has come under the York and North Yorkshire Combined Authority, with the sitting Mayor of York and North Yorkshire being David Skaith.

== Demographics ==
At the 2021–2022 United Kingdom censuses, the ward of Micklegate, which South Bank is part of, recorded a population of 12,405. The ward had a higher percentage of people from black and ethnic minority communities than York in general (7.8% against 7.3%), but had a lower rate of working age people claiming Universal credit than the overall city.

== Facilities ==
Located near the old Terry's factory is York Racecourse, which forms part of the larger Knavesmire. There is an Athletics Club, the Knavesmire Harriers, who train in this area. The Millennium Bridge, which links South Bank to Fishergate and Fulford on the other side of the river, was completed in 2001 at a cost of £4.2 million.

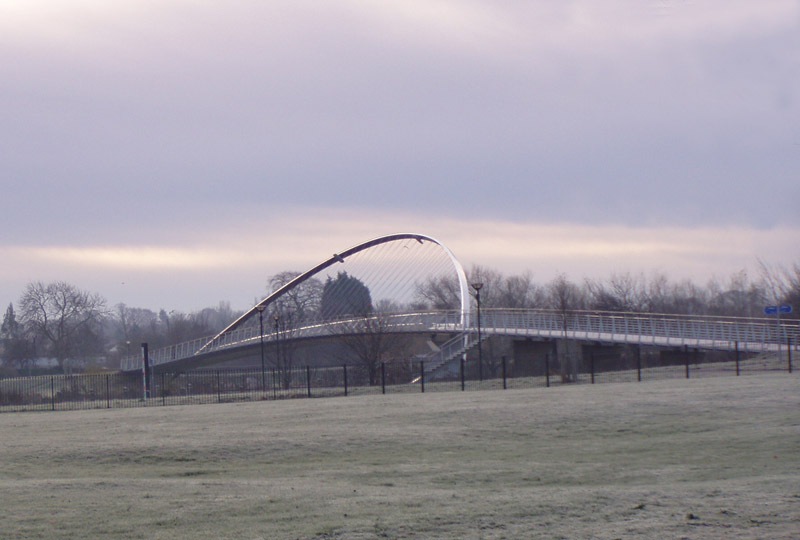
The Millennium Bridge from South Bank

Knavesmire Primary School opened in 1914 and is the main primary school in the area. Millthorpe School was formerly a specialist language college and converted to academy status in April 2016.

The main Catholic secondary school in the area (and in York as a whole) is the "outstanding" All Saints RC School which also houses the only sixth form in the area. It has two sites, the upper site (which is host to years 10–13) is located between Tadcaster Road, Albemarle Road, Scarcroft Hill and Scarcroft Road.

The parish church is St Chad's Church, designed by Walter Brierley. Southlands Methodist Church is located on Bishopthorpe Road and was designed by Charles Bell.

St Chad's Greys is the local Scout Group. It was formed in 1926 and is one of the largest groups in York and one of only three groups in North Yorkshire which have a Scout Band.

== Gallery ==
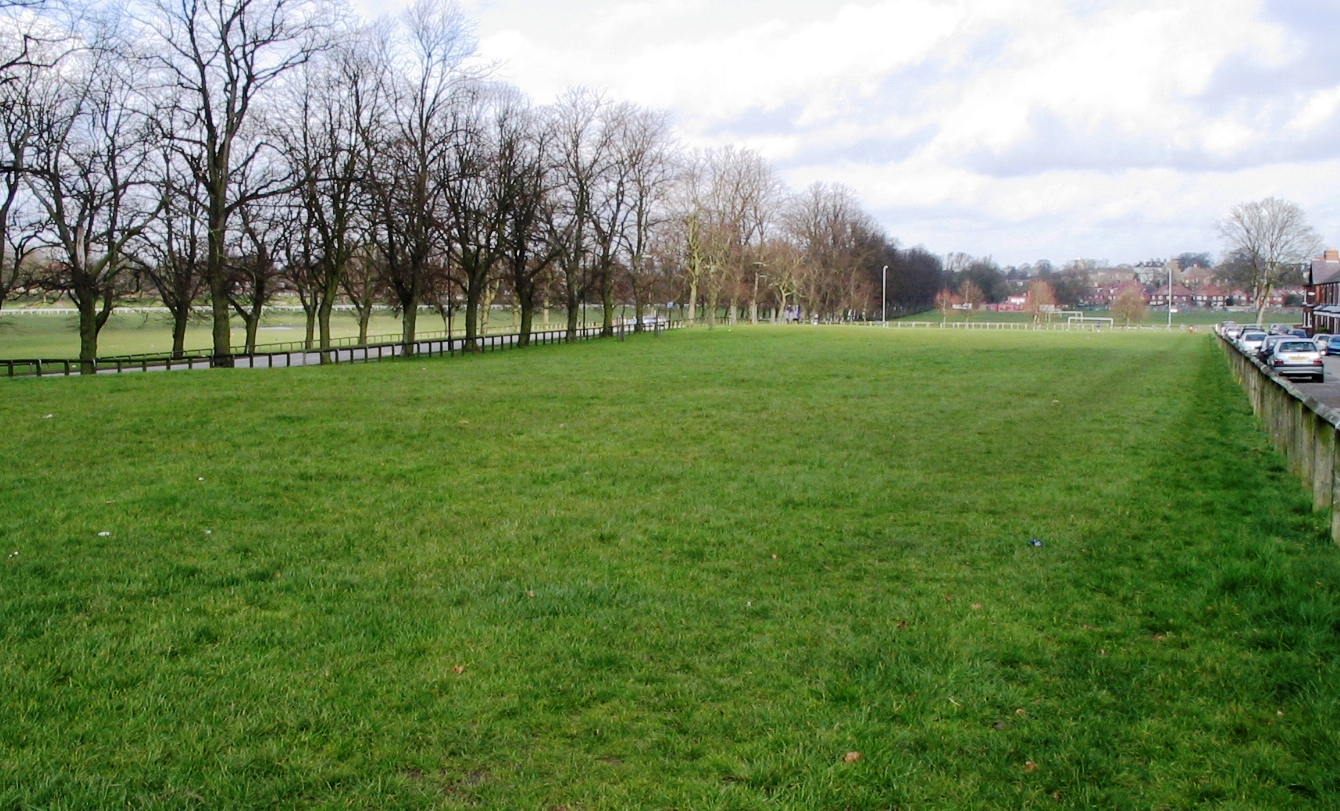
Knavesmire from South Bank

Terry's factory site with York Racecourse in the background

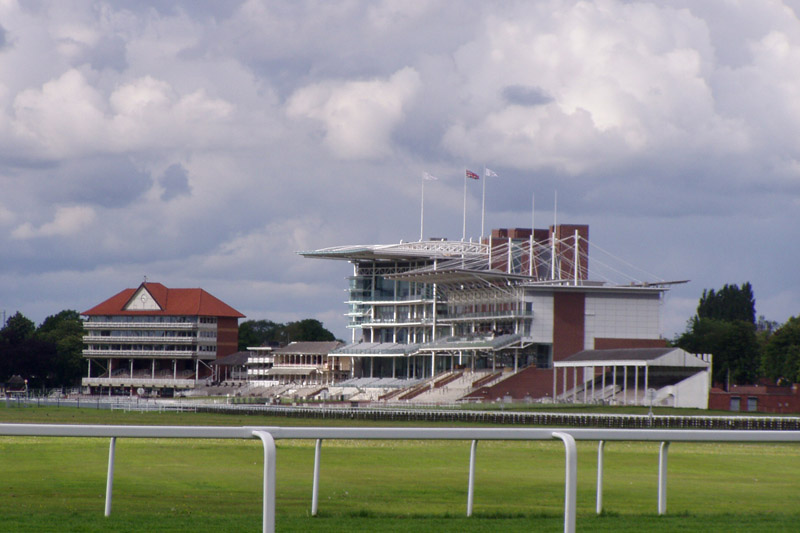
A view of the Ebor stand at York Racecourse
