= Copper Dragon =

Copper Dragon may refer to:

- Copper Dragon, a type of dragon in Dungeons & Dragons
- Copper Dragon Brewery
