= All Golds =

The All Golds could mean;

== Rugby league ==
- The touring party of New Zealand players in the 1907–08 New Zealand rugby tour of Australia and Great Britain
- The New Zealand national rugby league team itself
- The 2007 All Golds Tour in celebration of the original tour
- University of Gloucestershire All-Golds, an English rugby league side

== Chocolate ==
- Terry's All Gold
