= Bishopthorpe Road =

Street in York, England

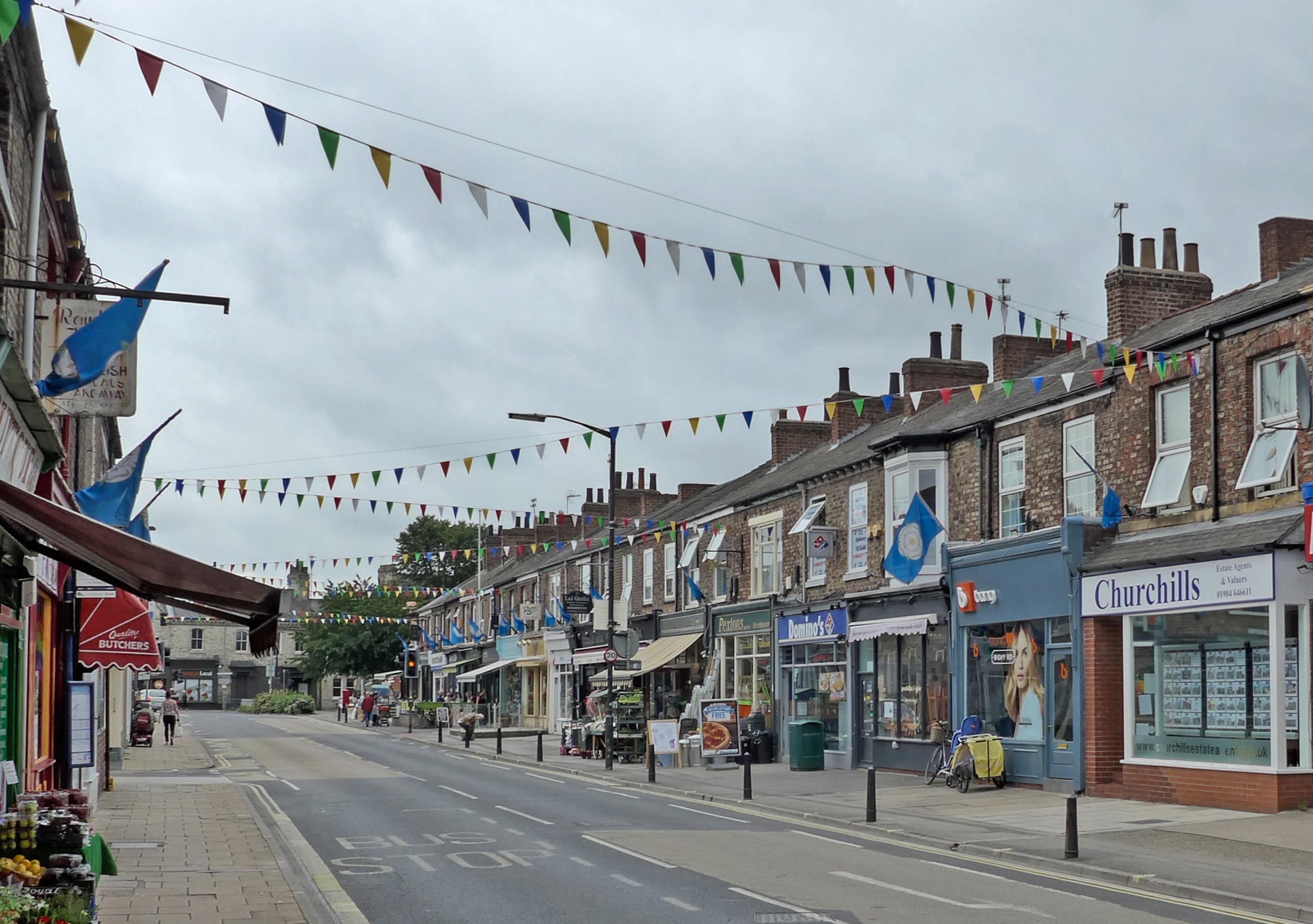
- View south on the northern part of the street, in 2015
- Location within York
- Location: York, England
- Coordinates: 53.9374°N 1.0883°W
- North end: Bishopgate Street; Nunnery Lane; Darnborough Street
- Major junctions: Scarcroft Road
- South end: Main Street; Chantry Lane

Bishopthorpe Road is a radial route in York, in England, connecting the city centre with the village of Bishopthorpe. It is locally known as Bishy Road.

== History ==
The route may be Roman in origin, and in 1981, a cobbled surface was discovered, 2 metres under the present road level. Around the former Terry's chocolate factory, evidence of both Roman and Mediaeval agriculture has been discovered. The area remained almost wholly agricultural until the late 18th-century, with Nun Windmill being built at what is now the street's junction with Southlands Road. The Knavesmire common land lay along the west side of the middle section of the street, although there was some enclosure immediately alongside the road. In the 18th-century, this area became York Racecourse, which now has access from the road.

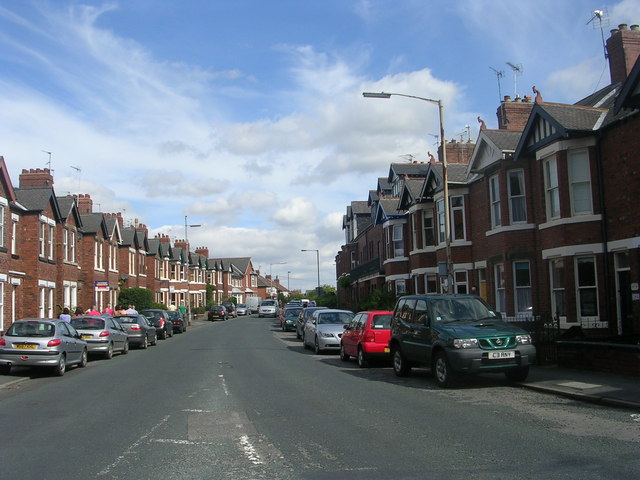
Houses on the street, around Campleshon Road

During the 19th-century, terraced housing for workers was built along the northern section of the street, and also on the east side south of Cameron Grove, near the South Bank suburb. The gap between these two built-up areas was filled in between 1890 and 1910, with larger, private housing, with front gardens. South of Beresford Terrace, more housing was constructed in the inter-war period. In 1924, the Terry's chocolate factory opened, steadily expanding until it closed in 2005.

In 1916, the Knavesmire Council School opened on the street, moving further out of town in the 1960s, to become the Knavesmire Secondary School. Its campus later became part of the University of Law, and later a school connected with the Plymouth Brethren. In 1962, the York Crematorium opened near Middlethorpe.

The City of York Council characterises the northern section of the street as having a "vibrant, commercial feel hosting independent retailers and cafes", while in 2017 the Yorkshire Post described it as "stacked with great cafes, bars, and shops... arguably one of the best community-led areas in the city". In 2015, the street won main prize at the Great British High Street Awards. In 2020, the northern section of the street was made one-way, but this was ended following concerns that it had moved traffic to less suitable roads nearby.

== Layout and architecture ==
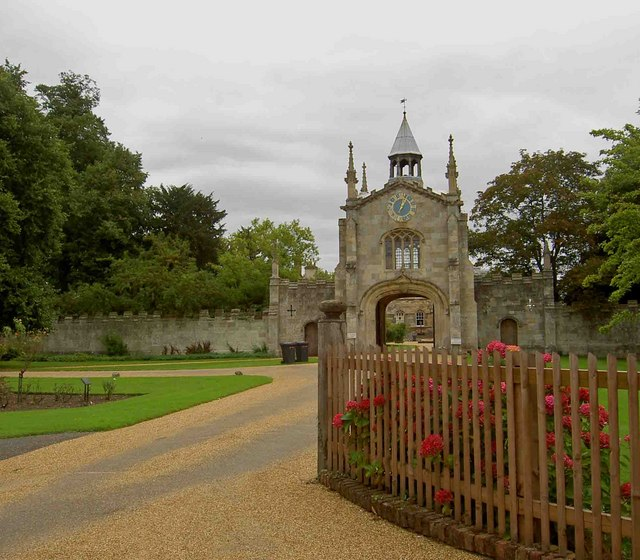
The gatehouse of Bishopthorpe Palace, near the southern end of the street

The street runs south, from its junction with Nunnery Lane and Darnborough Street in Clementhorpe, continuing the line of Bishopgate Street. The northernmost section of the street is a shopping area, and forms part of the A59 road. South of its junction with Scarcroft Road, it is unclassified, and the next section is mostly residential, with access to Rowntree Park up streets on its eastern side. Further south again, beyond The Chocolate Works, it is less built up, running parallel to the western bank of the River Ouse and passing through Middlethorpe, until it ends in the village of Bishopthorpe.

Notable buildings on the street include the Southlands Methodist Church; the Winning Post pub; several associated with the former Terry's chocolate factory, now converted to residential use as The Chocolate Works; the Walker Barstow almshouses; Middlethorpe Hall; Middlethorpe Manor; Bishopthorpe Palace and its outbuildings; St Andrew's Church, Bishopthorpe; and the Bishopthorpe War Memorial.
