= Southlands Methodist Church =

Methodist church in York, England

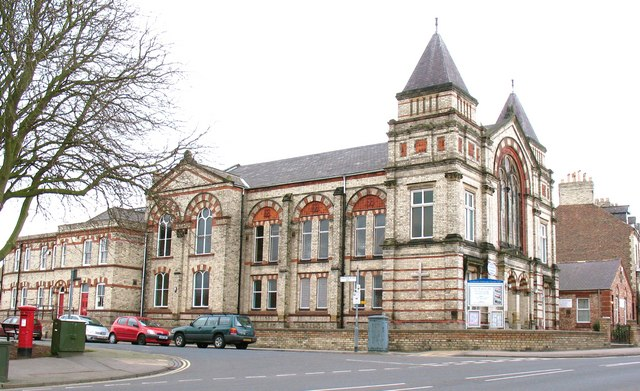
- Southlands Methodist Church
- Southlands Methodist Church
- 53°56′57.5″N 1°5′6.9″W
- OS grid reference: SE 60127 50735
- Location: York
- Country: England
- Denomination: Methodist
- Website: southlandsmethodist.org.uk

Architecture
- Architect: Charles Bell
- Groundbreaking: 1 October 1886
- Completed: 13 October 1887
- Construction cost: £6,641

Southlands Methodist Church is a Victorian Methodist church on Bishopthorpe Road in South Bank, York, England.

== History ==
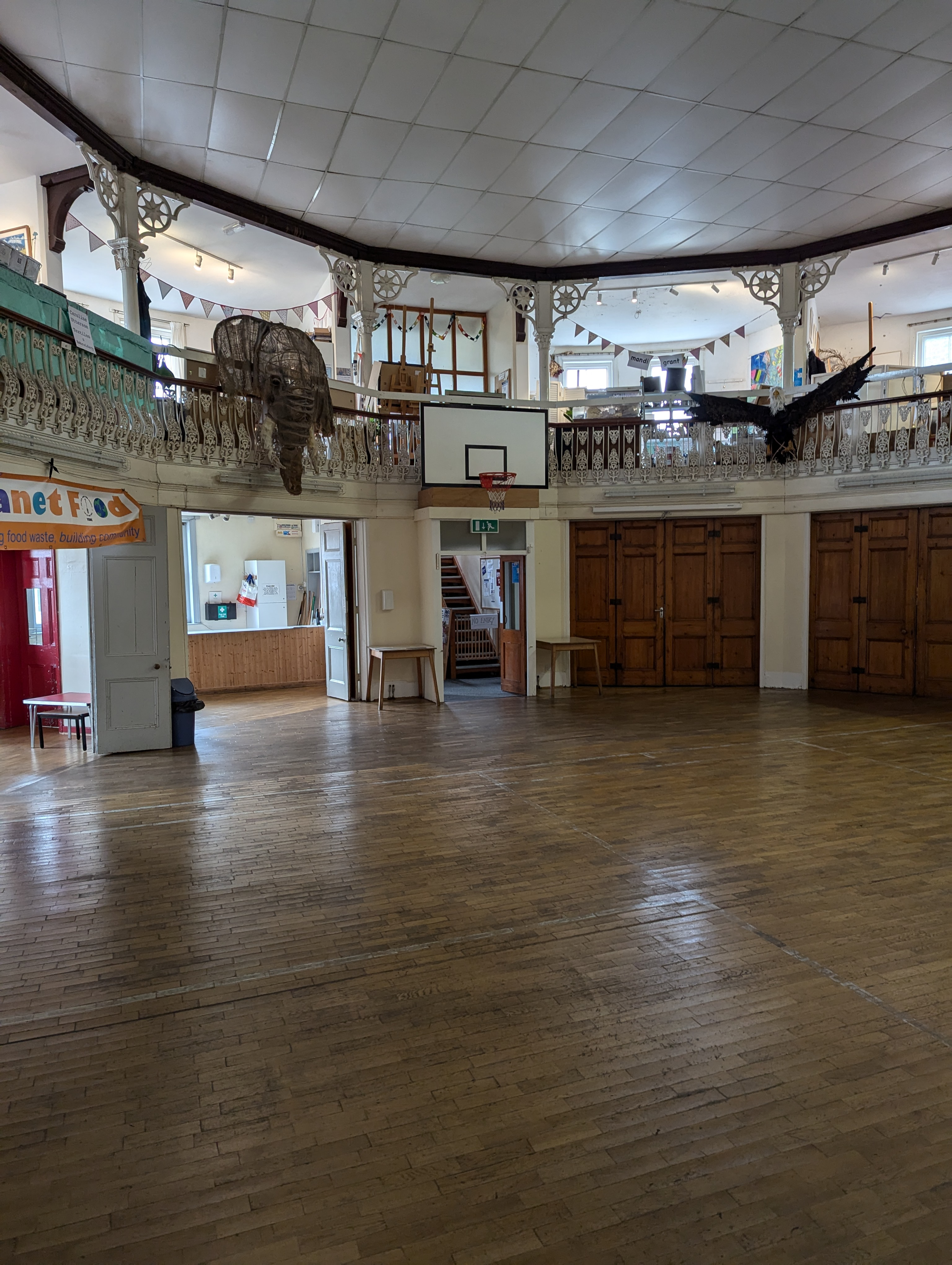
The rear hall

The foundation stones were laid on 1 October 1886 by Sir W G McArthur KCMG, the Lord Mayor of York, the City Sheriff and other aldermen. It was designed by the architect Charles Bell. It was "the third great Wesleyan chapel" built within York in a short period of time when it opened as 'Southlands Chapel' on 13 October 1887. It has twin towers on either side of an ornamental window and is built of white Walling Fen brick. There was accommodation for 750 persons in a large central hall with fifteen schoolrooms opening upon it; the cost was £6,641 (equivalent to £754,976 in 2025).

An organ was installed in 1893 at a cost of £438 (equivalent to £48,662 in 2025). In 1920 a hall was erected to provide accommodation for the Young Men's Association and other recreational activities; it is a memorial to church members who fell in the First World War and cost £1,753 (equivalent to £67,742 in 2025).

In 1905 the membership of Southlands was hit when the York locomotive works moved to Darlington, with the relocation of 2000 workers.
