= Knavesmire =

Public open space in York, England

Coordinates: 53.94204°N 1.09812°W

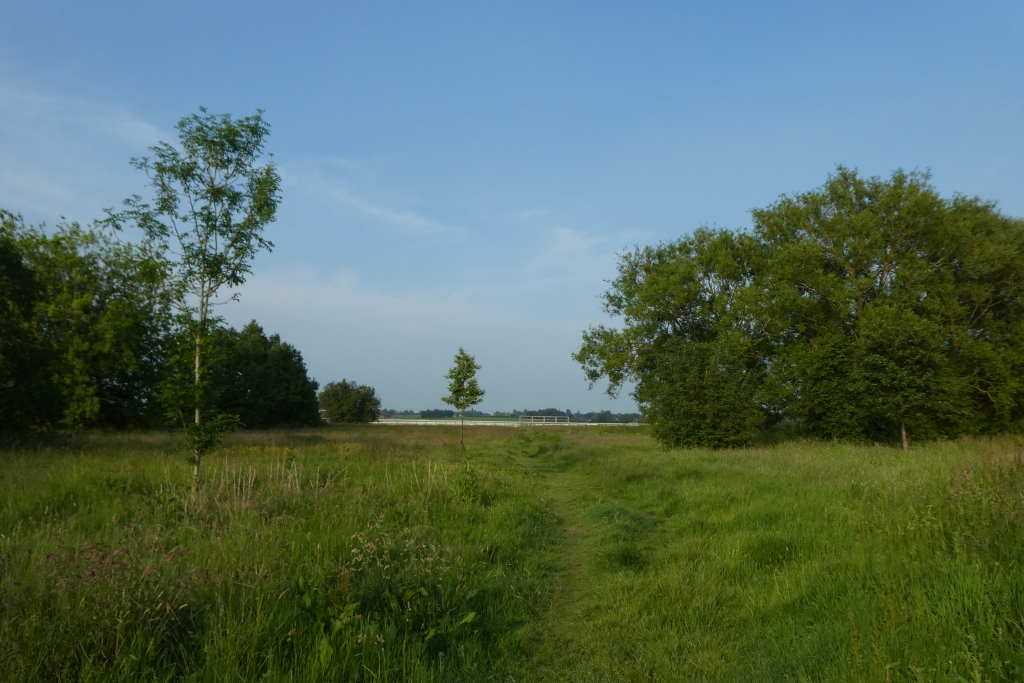
- Path on the edge of the Knavesmire

- Location within North Yorkshire
- OS grid reference: SE592499
- Unitary authority: City of York
- Ceremonial county: North Yorkshire
- Region: Yorkshire and the Humber
- Country: England
- Sovereign state: United Kingdom
- Post town: YORK
- Postcode district: YO23
- Police: North Yorkshire
- Fire: North Yorkshire
- Ambulance: Yorkshire

The Knavesmire is one of a number of large, marshy undeveloped areas within the city of York in North Yorkshire, England, which are collectively known as Strays. Knavesmire, together with Hob Moor, comprises Micklegate Stray. The York Tyburn, the site of a gallows administered on behalf of The Crown by York Castle, was situated in the area adjacent to the Tadcaster Road.

It has been suggested that the name 'Knavesmire' may share a derivation with Knaresborough—Cenward's mire.

== History ==
Situated in the south-west of the city, some distance outside the historic walls, Knavesmire's low-lying position makes it liable to severe flooding in times of heavy rain. As a consequence, it remained undeveloped as the city expanded around it.

The Knavesmire was the site of York Golf course for many years.

During the Second World War, parts of the Knavesmire were farmed, while other parts were used for military purposes including an anti-aircraft battery and a prisoner of war transit camp which was located near the grandstand.

Knavesmire was also the site of Knavesmire Secondary School, which then became one of the campuses of The College of Law till 2014. Millthorpe School uses the Knavesmire for cross country running. Knavesmire Primary School is located on Campleshon Road, at the southern end of Knavesmire Road. In 1864 a letter was sent to the York press from H. J. Jenkinson of the Leeds football club suggesting that the citizens of York form a football team and that they should play a friendly match on Knavesmire.

Between 2009 and 2022, it was also home to Yorkshire's largest beer festival. The annual York CAMRA Beer & Cider Festival was held in a marquee on Knavesmire opposite the Grandstand.

=== York gallows ===
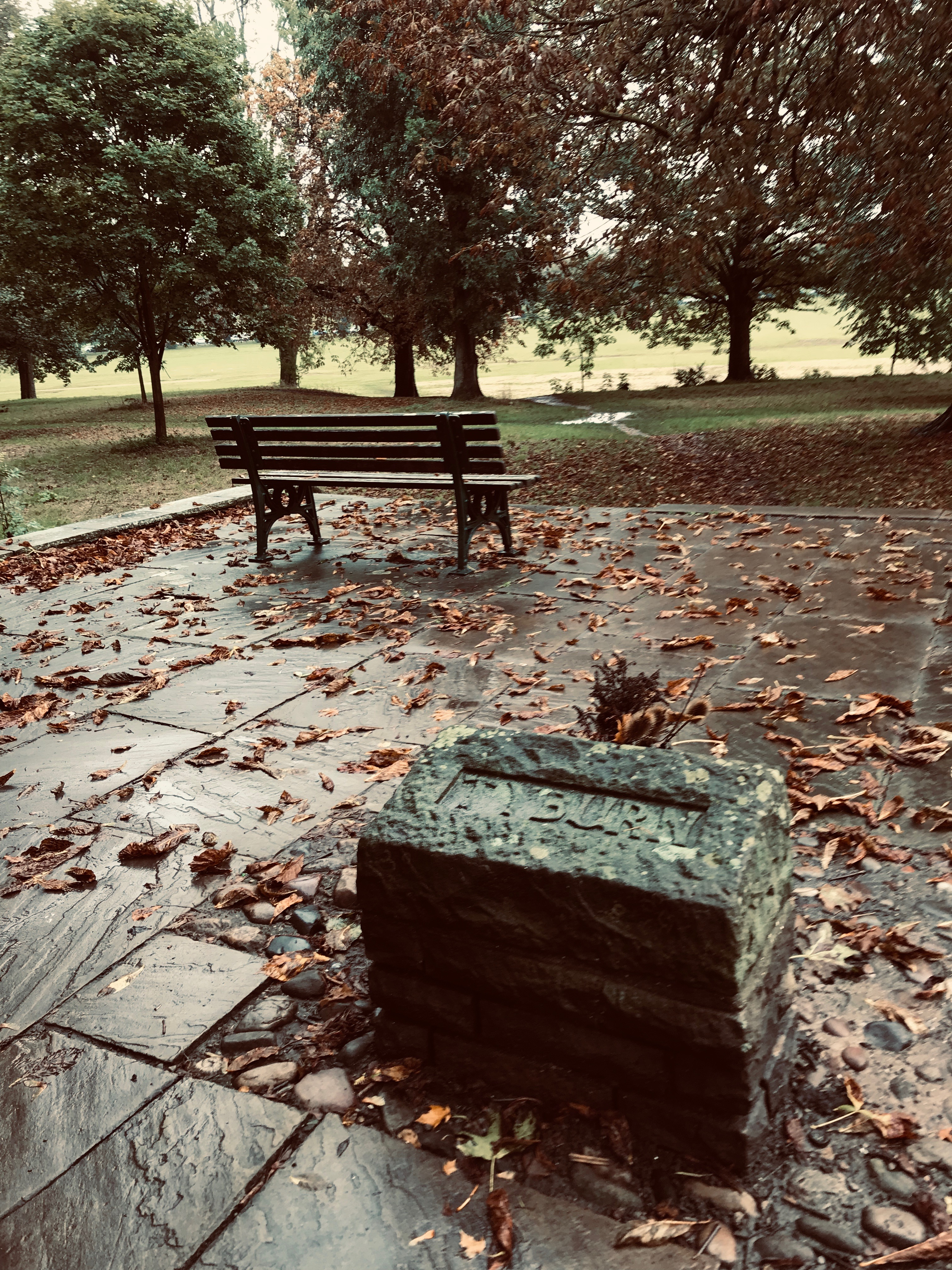
York's Tyburn at Knavesmire

For many years, Knavesmire was the site of public hangings in York. The gallows were erected in 1379, a few miles outside the city on the main southern approach road (now known as the A1036 Tadcaster Road). The execution site was often referred to as "York Tyburn" after the original Tyburn gallows in Middlesex.

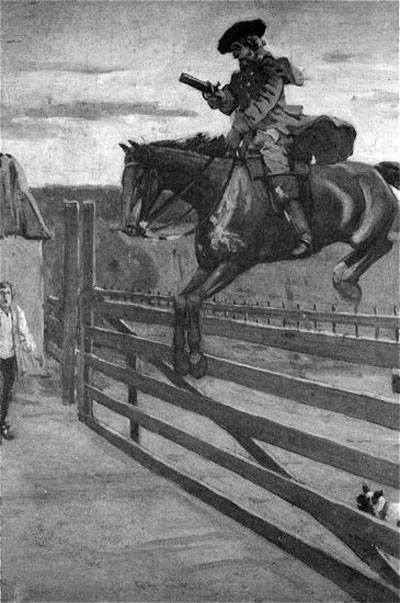
Dick Turpin was hanged at Knavesmire in 1739

Probably the most famous people to be executed there were Rhys ap Maredudd, a Welsh nobleman and rebel, hanged in 1292, and Dick Turpin, who was hanged in 1739. Catholic priests Alexander Rawlins and Henry Walpole were hanged, drawn and quartered on 7 April 1595. Another Catholic priest, Nicholas Postgate, was hanged, drawn and quartered there in 1679. The philologist and murderer Eugene Aram was hanged there in 1759. One of the last women to be burned at the stake was Elizabeth Broadingham, who had already been killed with her lover, in 1790.

By the beginning of the 19th century, it was felt that the gallows did not create a good first impression for visitors to the city. The last hanging at Knavesmire was that of Edward Hughes in 1801, after which the gallows were moved to a more discreet (although still public) location near the castle. A paved area with a small plaque today marks the position in which the scaffold stood.

== Current usage ==
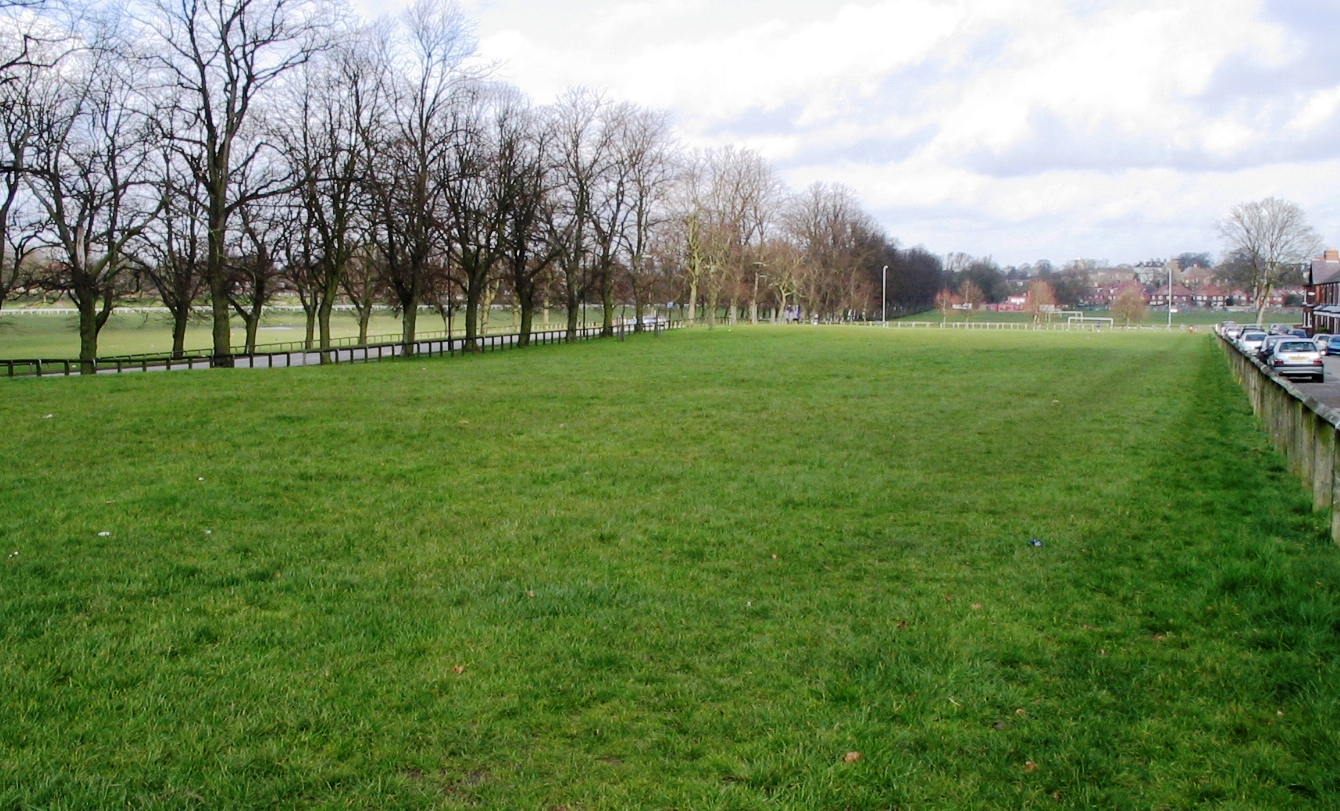
Knavesmire from South Bank

The Knavesmire is used for recreation and for public events. It is a popular site for dog-walking, and a large part of it is occupied by York Racecourse. The York Races were first moved to the Knavesmire from Clifton in 1731. Since January 2012 it has been the location of the York Parkrun, a free 5k running event held every Saturday morning.

The Little Knavesmire is the home of Ovington CC.
