= Terry's =

British confectionary brand

- Traded as: Private company
- Industry: Confectionery
- Predecessor: Bayldon and Berry; Terry and Berry
- Founded: 1767
- Headquarters: formerly York, now London, England
- Number of locations: The Chocolate Works, York
- Area served: Global
- Key people: Joseph Terry
- Products: Terry's Chocolate Orange; Terry's All Gold
- Owner: Terry family (1767–1963); Forte Group (1963–1977); Colgate-Palmolive (1977–1982); United Biscuits (1982–1993); Kraft Foods Inc (1993–2012); Mondelēz International (2012–2016); Carambar & Co (2016–present)
- Parent: Ferrero SpA (2025-present)
- Website: terryschocolate.com

Terry's (formerly Terry's of York) is a British chocolate and confectionery brand. The original company was founded in 1767 in York, England, and was part of the city's famous confectionery triumvirate along with Rowntree's and Cravens. The company's headquarters and factory, Terry's Chocolate Works, was closed by Kraft in 2005 and production moved to Kraft factories in Europe. The business returned to the UK in 2019 as Terry's Chocolate Co located in London. Their best known products include Terry's Chocolate Orange and Terry's All Gold box of assorted chocolates which were both introduced in the 1930s.

The Terry's business has changed ownership on many occasions. Initially the company became a subsidiary of Forte Group in 1963 before being sold to Colgate-Palmolive in 1977. The company was purchased by United Biscuits in 1982, becoming the company's confectionery arm, before being sold in 1993 to Kraft Foods Inc. The Terry's name became part of Mondelēz International after the split of Kraft in 2012. In 2016 it was bought by investment company Eurazeo that formed the French confectioner Carambar & Co. In 2025, Ferrero SpA of Italy bought Carambar & Co from Eurazeo.

Products using the Terry's brand name are now produced in the Carambar facilities in Strasbourg.

== History ==
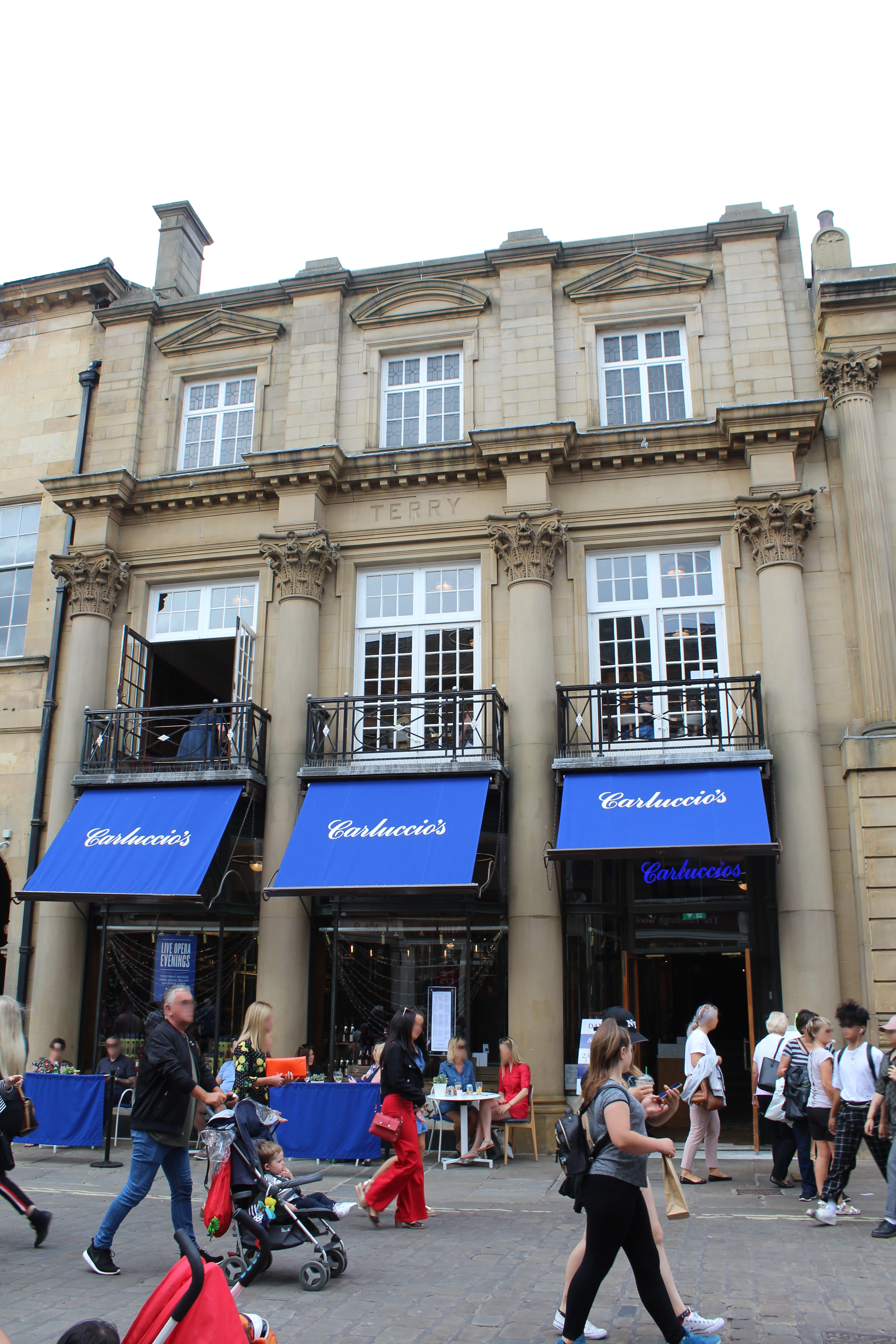
Terry's building in St Helen's Square

The business began in 1767 as a shop close to Bootham Bar, York, selling cough lozenges, lemon and orange candied fruit, and other sweets. When Robert Berry formed a partnership with William Bayldon the firm took the name Bayldon and Berry and by 1818 the business had moved to 3 St Helen's Square, York.

Joseph Terry, who was born in Pocklington in 1793, went to York to serve as an apprentice apothecary in either Stonegate or Spurriergate. On gaining his certificates, he set up as a chemist in Walmgate. In 1823 he married Harriet Atkinson, who was either a niece or sister-in-law of Robert Berry and after closing his chemist shop he joined the Berry confectionery business, from which William Bayldon had retired in 1821.

In 1825, after the death of Robert Berry, Terry agreed to a new partnership with George Berry; they renamed the business Terry & Berry. The partnership was joined by John Coultherd, but in 1828 George Berry left and the business was renamed Joseph Terry and Company. Two years later Coultherd also left and Terry became the sole owner of the business.

=== Joseph Terry and Company ===
Using the skills he learned as a chemist, Joseph developed new lines of confectionery. He began using the developing railway network of the North Eastern Railway to distribute his products in the North of England and in London. By 1840, Terry's products were sold in over 75 towns and cities and sold various products including candied eringo, coltsfoot rock, gum balls and conversation lozenges, which were an early form of Love Hearts. The company also produced marmalade, marzipan, ketchups and jellies.

After Joseph Terry died in 1850 the company was in the control of solicitors and executors until 1854 when it was handed over to his sons Joseph Jnr, Robert, and John. Joseph quickly expanded the business; four years later he moved production to a leased site at Clementhorpe, beside the River Ouse. This allowed easy shipment of raw products into the new production facility from the Humber Estuary; twice weekly a steam ship brought ingredients, including sugar and cocoa, as well as coal to power the new steam-powered machinery. Joseph was knighted for his services to industry in 1887 and became Lord Mayor of York for the fourth time in 1890. He renamed the business Joseph Terry & Sons and it became a limited liability company in 1895. The Grade II listed St Helen's Square premises was retained by the company as a shop and restaurant until 1980 after which it was sold and the restaurant was converted into offices.

=== Joseph Terry and Sons ===
The Chocolate Works factory clock tower, with York Racecourse in the background

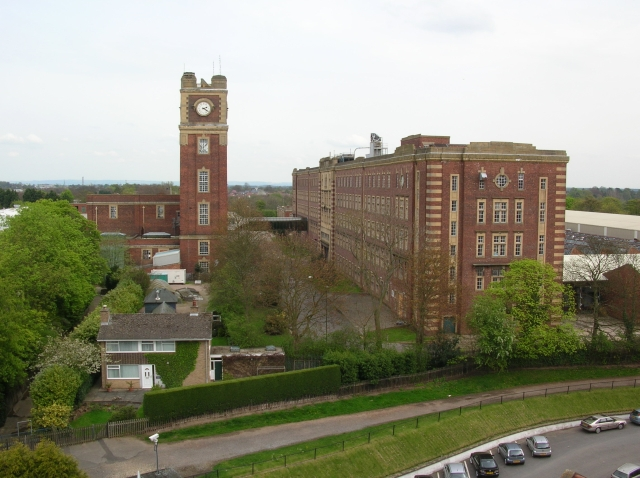
The former Terry's chocolate factory, 2008. Taken from the 4th floor of the Ebor stand at York Racecourse

When Sir Joseph died in 1898 he was succeeded by his sons Frank and Thomas Terry and the following year Terry's Neapolitans were launched. Thomas died following a road accident in 1910 and his son Noel joined the company the following year. In the First World War Noel served in France until he was wounded and later joined his uncle Frank who had been seconded to the Ministry of Pensions. Henry Ernest Leetham, a York businessman and the father-in-law of Noel Terry became chairman of Terry's from 1915 until his death in 1923 at which point Frank and Noel Terry resumed family control of the business. They restructured the company, launched new products, and bought a site in Bishopthorpe Road, York, on which to develop a new factory known as Terry's Chocolate Works. The new factory was built in an Art Deco style and included a distinctive clock tower. It was opened in 1926; new products included the Chocolate Apple (1926), Terry's Chocolate Orange (1932), and Terry's All Gold, which were developed and produced onsite. In 1934, Joseph Terry & Sons was listed on the London Stock Exchange.

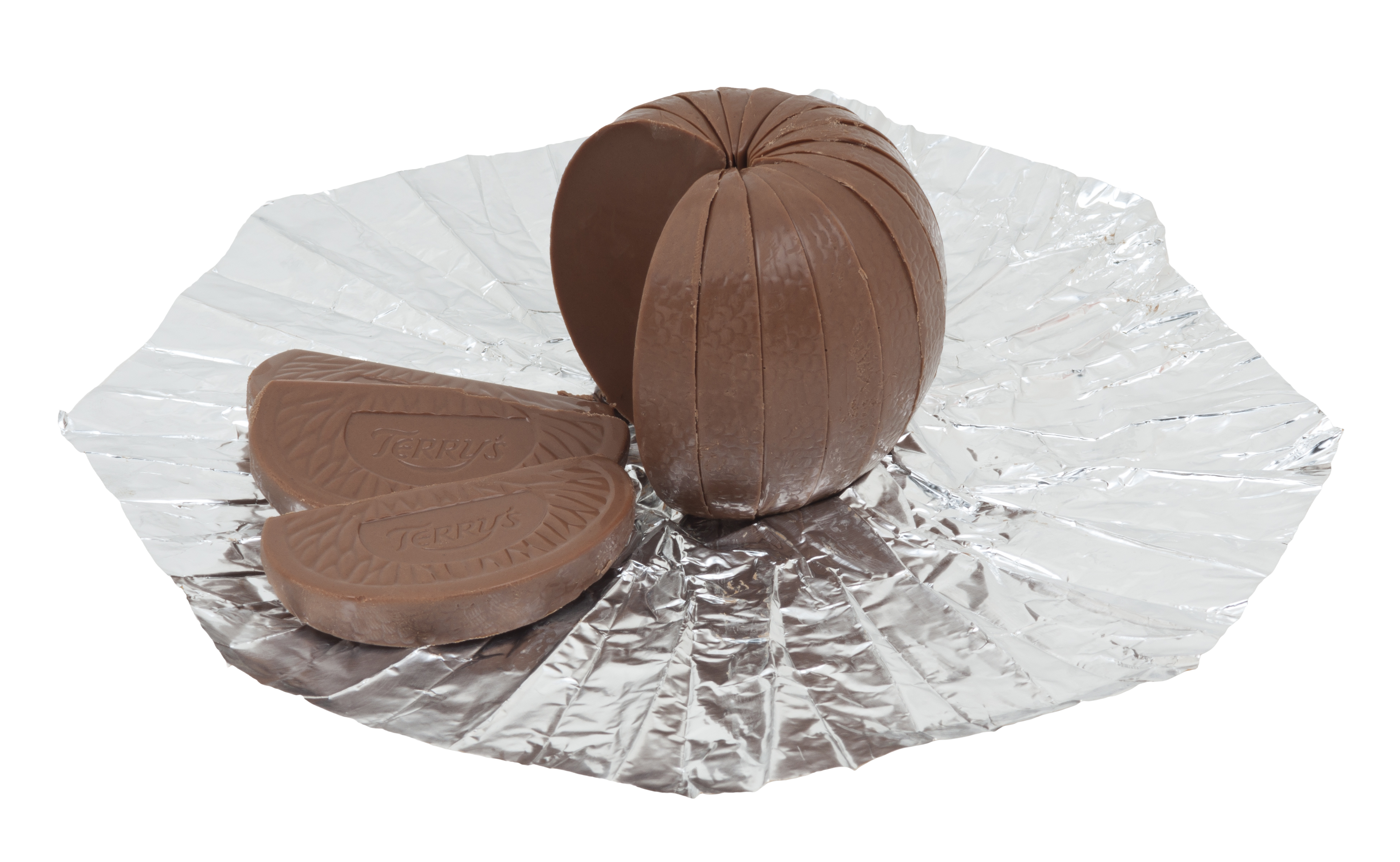
Terry's Chocolate Orange

=== Second World War ===
With the onset of the Second World War The factory was taken over by F. Hills and Sons of Manchester as a shadow factory to manufacture and repair aircraft propeller blades. Confectionery production continued but was done for other companies; the Clementhorpe factory produced jellies for Chivers and Sons whilst chocolate was manufactured for Charbonnel et Walker. Production also included chocolate for troop and lifeboat rations.

=== Post-war era ===
After the war ended, the factory was handed back to the company. Production was difficult because of rationing and limited imports of raw cocoa. As a result, in 1954 production of the chocolate apple was phased out in favour of increased production of the chocolate orange. Frank Terry retired in 1958, and was replaced as chairman by Noel Terry, with Frank dying in 1960. The business was purchased by the Forte group from the Terry family in 1963, with the Mayor of York, Mona Armitage, asking whether Terry's had been fortified or Fortes terrified. The price was £4.25 million paid for in Forte shares and Noel Terry joined the Forte board. Forte Group already owned Fullers, a bakery and confectionery company based in Hammersmith, closing their factory in 1964 and transferring their confectionery production, including Peppermint lumps to York. Charles Forte appointed Ian Johnston as managing director; Johnston modernised the business and introduced the first television adverts for the company. The Colgate-Palmolive company acquired Joseph Terry & Sons from Trust House Forte in 1977 for £17 million. Terry's at this time had 30% of the UK market for assortment boxes, with All Gold accounting for 20%, while Moonlight accounted for a further 10%. It was under Colgate-Palmolive that Terry's developed the short lived Chocolate Lemon. By 1981 Terry's revenue from All Gold stood at £11 million.

United Biscuits subsequently acquired Joseph Terry & Sons from Colgate-Palmolive in 1982 for £24.5 million after a management buyout lost out. A year after Terry's had announced pre-tax profits of £2.7 million. Terry's would form the bulk of their confectionery division. United Biscuits used Terry's to develop private branded products for retailers which at the time only had 2% of the chocolate market. Peter Terry, the last family member that worked for the business left in 1985. In 1988, United Biscuits purchased the confectionery business of Callard and Bowser from Beatrice Foods, and together the companies were known as the Terry's Group. United Biscuits purchased French confectionery company Chocometz for £5.5 million in 1990 and added it to the Terry's Group, while also agreeing a distribution deal for Marabou's Daim bar in the UK. In 1992, United Biscuits purchased 74% of Italian confectionery business Aura which was merged into Terry's Group. Terry's Group in 1991 had made $14.3 million pre tax profits on $153 million of sales, 5% of United Biscuits business.

United Biscuits in 1992 decided to concentrated its business on the savory snacks and biscuits, and sold Terry's Group to Philip Morris and its subsidiary Kraft Foods for £220 million. Terry's was amalgamated with Chocolat Suchard, to form Terry's Suchard, in 1993 after Philip Morris purchased Jacob Suchard Tobler. From 2000, the company brand was changed from Terry's of York to Terry's, reducing the company's links with York. Production was also scaled back to UK products and Terry's Chocolate Orange, Terry's All Gold, and Twilight made for the international market. Kraft had promised unions that production was being moved as the factory was not capable to handle production, and that they were looking for new sites in York.

=== The new millennium ===
In 2004, Kraft Foods decided to absorb Terry's, move production of remaining products such as All Gold and Chocolate Orange to factories in Belgium, Sweden, Poland, and Slovakia, and close the plant. The factory closed on 30 September 2005 with the loss of 316 jobs.

In 2012, Kraft split into two companies; one called Kraft Foods Group and the other called Mondelēz International. After the split, Terry's became part of Mondelēz. It was reported in December 2015 that Mondelēz were in discussions with Lazard, the investment bank about selling several of their brands which included Terry's. Mondelēz controversially reduced the size of the Chocolate Orange in 2016 which produced outrage amongst the buying public. In 2016, Terry's was one of a number of brands acquired by Eurazeo and it subsequently became part of Carambar & Co. Production of the Chocolate Orange was moved to the Caramber facilities in Strasbourg.

=== Terry's Chocolate Company Ltd ===
In February 2019, Carambar & Co set up a UK subsidiary called Terry's Chocolate Co to market the Terry's range in the UK market. The company is based in Finchley, London. In 2021, Heinz collaborated with Terry's to produce the world's first Chocolate Orange Mayonnaise.

== Advertising and marketing ==
During the 1920s and 1930s, Terry's launched luxurious ornate packaging, which the company's 1930 product catalogue stated, The purchaser of today expects a chocolate box to be worthy of the confections it contains – in distinction of design and harmony of colours, it must reflect the quality of the chocolates within.

In 1982, Terry's launched the legendary Jungle advert for Chocolate Orange, which was a spoof based on the film Raiders of the Lost Ark with the slogan "How safe is yours?", and was updated with a new version in 1987.

In 1997, Kraft employed Dawn French as the face of their advertising campaigns for the Chocolate Orange, using the catchphrase It's not Terry's, it's mine. In 2007, Kraft dropped Dawn French as the face of Chocolate Orange, with speculation that French no longer presented the right image for the company in the current climate of concerns over obesity and health.

== Manufacturing locations in York ==
- Terry's – Key locations within York
- 1. Clementhorpe Factory
- 2. The Chocolate Works

=== St Helen's Square ===
The business was based in St Helen's Square as early as 1818 in a building that served as both a shop and a factory until 1864 when production moved to the Clementhorpe site. The building was remodelled to include a ballroom and restaurant and in 1922 an Ashlar stone facade was added which included Corinthian columns and the name Terry was inscribed on the front of the building This inscription is still present in 2019. The premises was Grade II listed in 1974 but both the shop and restaurant closed in early 1981 and it was bought by the neighbouring Trustee Savings Bank who converted the restaurant into offices. However it reopened as a restaurant in March 2017 and in August 2017 a blue plaque in honour of Joseph Terry the elder was added by York Civic Trust and unveiled by his great-great-great-grandson Anthony Terry.

=== Clementhorpe ===
The Clementhorpe factory was initially leased by the business in 1858 on what was the site of a former brewery and a new chocolate factory was built in 1862. The area lies just outside the city walls. A new five-storey building was added in 1920 and the factory continued to operate even after the business expanded to Bishopthorpe Road.

After the factory closed, the chimney was pulled down in 1974 and the rest of the site demolished in 1987. A Roman mosaic was discovered on the site at this time, which Peter Terry had excavated to be preserved by the Yorkshire Museum.

=== Terry's Chocolate Works ===
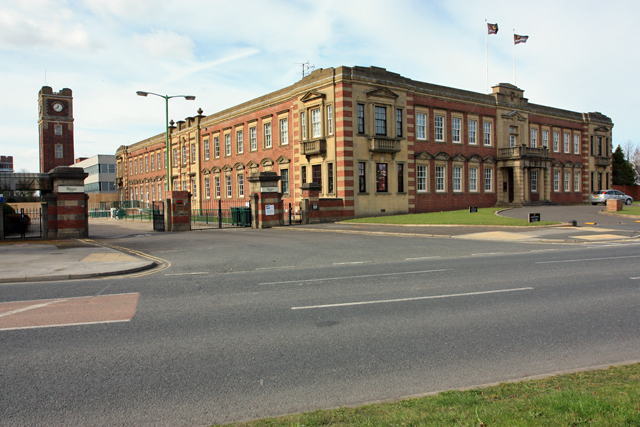
Grade II listed Art Deco-style main office and clock tower, seen from the Bishopthorpe Road, York

In 1924 work began on the construction of the Terry's Chocolate Works on Bishopthorpe Road, South Bank, York. The buildings designed by architect J. E. Wade and built by Dorman Long included a 135-foot (41 m) tall clock tower and the five-storey 510-foot (160 m) long main factory building. These, along with the head office building were designated Grade II listed in March 2005 six months before the site closed. The site was bought by developers Grantside and renamed The Chocolate Works. In February 2010, planning permission for a £165 million redevelopment of the site as a mixed-use of residential, commercial and leisure was given. Redevelopment started in 2011 with the removal of asbestos and the demolition of non-scheduled buildings in early 2012. The main factory building underwent a £38 million redevelopment in which it was renamed as The Residence and the first apartments were made available in 2016. The main office building was converted into The Chocolate Works Care Village which opened in 2017.

== Terry family ==
Sir Joseph Terry was Lord Mayor of York in 1874, 1885–86 and 1890.

Sir Francis Terry (Frank Terry) was High Sheriff of Yorkshire in 1945–46 and Peter Terry, son of Noel Terry, was High Sheriff of North Yorkshire in 1980–81.

== Current products ==
- Terry's Chocolate Orange: Introduced in 1932 as Terry's Dessert Chocolate Orange.
- Terry's Chocolate Orange Ice-cream Tubs and Sticks: Introduced 2023.
- Terry's Chocolate Mint: Introduced in 2023.
- Terry's Chocolate Milk: Introduced in 2024 – a plain milk chocolate in the orange shape.

== Discontinued products ==
- Terry's Neapolitans: Terry's was the first chocolate manufacturer to mass-produce Neapolitans in 1899. They were produced until the York factory was closed in 2005. The flavours were: Milk Chocolate (Blue), Plain Chocolate (Red), Mocha (coffee flavoured plain chocolate) (Brown), Cafe Au Lait (coffee flavoured milk chocolate) (Turquoise), Orange Milk Chocolate (Orange) and Orange Plain Chocolate (Pink)
- Terry's Spartan: Assortment box of hard-centred chocolates that was launched in 1921.
- Terry's Dessert Chocolate Apple: An apple-shaped chocolate introduced in 1924 and similar to the later developed chocolate orange. It was phased out in 1954.
- Terry's Cafe au Lait: A milk chocolate bar with coffee and walnuts.
- Terry's Theobroma: An assortment box of chocolates in a book-shaped box.
- Terry's Cream Toffee
- Terry's Snack: A box containing raisins and cereal aimed at hikers.
- Terry's All Gold: The assortment box of milk chocolates was launched in the 1930s and were discontinued in 2020. It once held 20% of the assortment box market.
- Terry's Devon Milk Chocolate Assortment
- Terry's Bridge Mints: A box of Mint Crisp Chocolates.
- Terry's Waifa: launched in 1952 and similar to Rowntree's Kit Kat. Production moved to Belgium in 2000.
- Terry's Twilight: A Dark chocolate (covered mint fondant) after dinner mint in a box.
- Terry's Animal Friends: A box of chocolates shaped as animals.
- Terry's Moonlight: A milk and dark chocolate assortment box.
- Terry's York Fruits: An assorted box of flavoured jellies. The brand was sold in 2008 to Smith Kendon.
- Terry's Pastilles: Fruit Pastilles. Production stopped in 1997.
- Terry's Chocolate Lemon: a lemon flavoured version of the chocolate orange was launched in 1979, but it was withdrawn three years later.
- Terry's Pyramint: A dark chocolate pyramid with a fondant cream filling.
- Terry's Logger: a chocolate bar rivalling Dairy Milk and Yorkie, either plain milk chocolate or fruit and nut.
- Terry's Bitz: Chocolate bar with flavoured sugared crunch pieces. Flavours included Plain Chocolate with Mint Crisp, Milk Chocolate with Orange Crisp or Cherry Crunch.
- Terry's Carousel: An assortment box of chocolates, jelly, fudge and sugared almonds.
- Terry's Caramel Crisp: A milk chocolate bar with caramel and crisped rice centre.
- Terry's Marzipan: A bar of Marzipan covered in Plain chocolate.
- Terry's Take2: A dark chocolate bar with Peppermint fondant centre.
- Terry's Coffee Cream: Two bars of milk chocolate with a coffee cream centre.
- Terry's Nutcracker: Milk-chocolate-covered Hazelnut with caramel.
- Terry's Harlequin: a box of wrapped milk chocolate ingots each with a different flavour and wrapping colour that was launched in 1985.
- Terry's Moments: Launched in 1991 as premium product aimed at women, it was a chocolate bar that contained caramel.
- Terry's Caramel Bite: A milk chocolate bar with caramel and crisped rice centre.
- Terry's 3D: A milk chocolate bar with a cream and biscuit filling.
- Terry's 1767: A selection box of plain chocolate.
- Terry's Fruit Flavoured Filled Block: Milk Chocolate with a fruit cream flavoured filling.
- Terry's New World: A chocolate selection box
- Terry's Royal Gold: Chocolate coated Turkish Delight.
- Terry's Nougatine Filled Block: Chocolate covered nougat.
- Terry's Brazil Nut: Milk Chocolate with Brazil Nuts.
- Terry's Caramel Eclairs
- Terry's Devon Milk Chocolate: Milk chocolate bar.
- Terry's Snack Chocolate: Chocolate bar.
- Terry's Oliver Twist Plain Chocolate: Plain Chocolate bar.
- Terry's Raisin Milk Chocolate: Milk chocolate bar with Raisins.
- Terry's Bitter Chocolate: Dark chocolate bar
- Terry's Crystallised Mint Creams: Box of crystallised mint creams.
- Terry's Dessert Almonds: Box of chocolate coated almonds.
- Terry's Dark: Bar of Dark Chocolate
- Terry's Criollo chocolate selection box

== Bibliography ==
- Chrystal, Paul; Dickinson, Joe (2012). A History of Chocolate in York. Pen and Sword Books. ISBN 978-1-84468-123-5.
- Chrystal, Paul (2013). Chocolate: The British Chocolate Industry. Bloomsbury. ISBN 9780747810742.
- Wilson, Van (2009). The Story of Terry's. York Oral History Society. ISBN 978-0-9513652-5-0.
