= The Chocolate Works =

Listed buildings in York, England

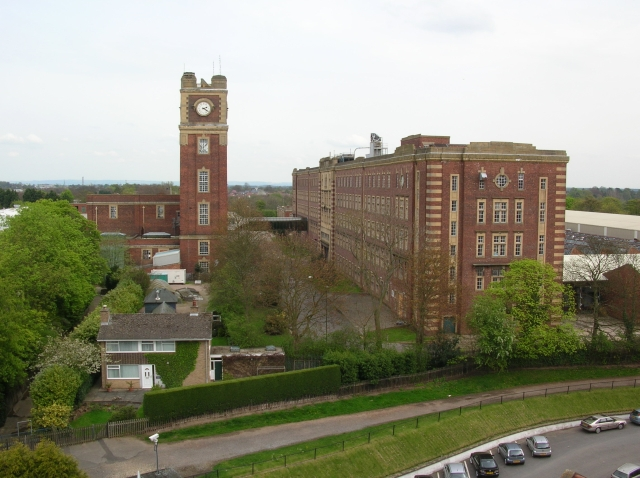
- The former Terry's chocolate factory, 2008. Taken from the fourth floor of the Ebor stand at York Racecourse
- Interactive map of the The Chocolate Works area

General information
- Type: Chocolate factory (former)
- Architectural style: Art Deco
- Location: York, England
- Coordinates: 53.94068°N 1.089596°W
- Construction started: 1924
- Completed: 1926
- Owner: Grantside

Design and construction
- Designations

Listed Building – Grade II
- Official name: Liquor factory
- Designated: 4 March 2005
- Reference no.: 1391641

Listed Building – Grade II
- Official name: Terry's of York clock tower, water tower and boiler house with transformer house attached
- Designated: 4 March 2005
- Reference no.: 1391642

Listed Building – Grade II
- Official name: Terry's of York factory
- Designated: 4 March 2005
- Reference no.: 1391643

Listed Building – Grade II
- Official name: Terry's of York time office block
- Designated: 4 March 2005
- Reference no.: 1391644

Listed Building – Grade II
- Official name: Terry's of York head offices
- Designated: 4 March 2005
- Reference no.: 1391645

The Chocolate Works, also known as Terry's Chocolate Works, was the confectionery factory of Terry's of York, England. Opened in 1926, it closed in 2005 with the loss of 300 jobs, with production moved to other Kraft Foods sites in mainland Europe. The site was subsequently converted to a mixed-use residential and commercial real estate development.

== History ==
=== Construction ===
In 1923, Frank and Noel Terry joined the family business, Terry's of York. They revamped the company, launching new products, and bought a site off Bishopthorpe Road, York, on which to develop a new factory. Built in an Art Deco style, the factory known as Terry's Chocolate Works included a distinctive clock tower.

=== Production ===
Opened in 1927, products including the Chocolate Apple (already introduced in 1924), Terry's Chocolate Orange (1932), and Terry's All Gold (1932) were all produced onsite.

With the onset of the Second World War, part of the factory was taken over by F. Hills and Sons of Manchester, with some of Terry's staff helping with the manufacture and repair of aircraft propeller blades. The Chocolate Works continued to produce Terry's products, which were regularly included in troops' rations, and it took on the manufacture of chocolate for London firm Charbonnel & Walker.

In 1978, Terry's was acquired by Colgate-Palmolive for about £17 million. The new owners developed the Chocolate Lemon, which proved to be a failure. The company was sold again a few years later to United Biscuits for £25 million, forming the bulk of their confectionery division. A new plant was built specifically for production of the Chocolate Orange. The business was sold by United Biscuits in 1992 to Kraft Foods for £220 million, who amalgamated it with Chocolat Suchard to create Terry's Suchard. Production was also scaled back, with just UK products and Terry's Chocolate Orange, Terry's All Gold and Twilight made for the international market.

=== Closure ===
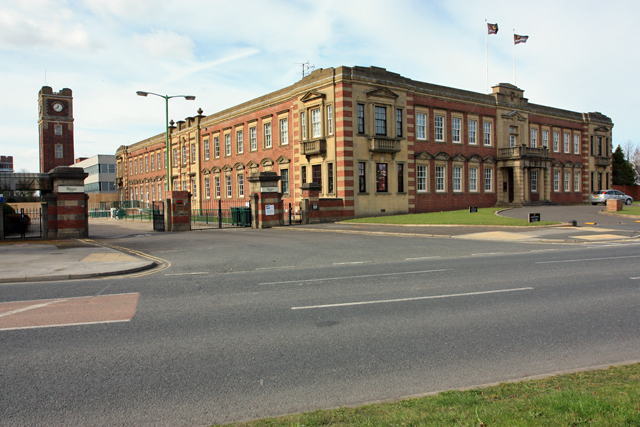
The Grade II-listed Art Deco-style head office and clock tower, seen from Bishopthorpe Road

In 2004, Kraft Foods decided to switch production of remaining products All Gold and Chocolate Orange to factories in Belgium, Sweden, Poland and Slovakia, and close the plant. The factory closed on 30 September 2005.

On 4 March 2005, several components of the former factory complex were designated Grade II in separate listings. These comprised the liquor factory; the clock tower, water tower and boiler house with the attached transformer house; the main factory; the time office block; and the head offices.

== Redevelopment ==
Bought by developers Grantside, the site was the subject of local consultation on future uses and was renamed The Chocolate Works. Their initial development proposal was rejected by the City of York Council. In February 2010, with the Grade II-listed time office building and Art Deco clock tower secured and scheduled for refurbishment, and despite objections from the Commission for Architecture and the Built Environment, the firm was granted planning permission for a £165 million mixed-use scheme of residential, commercial and leisure development. The eventual scheme was projected to create more than 2,700 jobs in new and refurbished offices, two hotels, shops, bars, cafés and restaurants, over 250 homes, a nursery, care home and medical centre.

Redevelopment began in 2011 with asbestos removal by trained and certified contractors, followed by demolition of non-scheduled buildings in early 2012.

In April 2013, the site was acquired by joint developers Henry Boot Developments and David Wilson Homes. Approval for a scheme to create 173 apartments was granted in June 2015.

In March 2023, following a £60,000 renovation project, the clock in the tower of the Chocolate Works began functioning again after a pause of 15 years.

== See also ==
- Listed buildings in York (outside the city walls, southern part)
