= Pyramint =

Brand of chocolate

The Pyramint was a brand of Terry's chocolate popular in the 1980s. Created in 1988, it was designed to resemble an Egyptian pyramid made of dark chocolate with a mint-flavoured fondant inside. It was changed to a bar format with pyramid segments in 1991. The Pyramint continued to be marketed under the Terry's label after the brand was sold to Philip Morris and its subsidiary Kraft Foods in 1992. The Pyramint was discontinued in the 1990s due to falling demand.
