= Terry's Chocolate Orange =

Orange chocolate confection from England

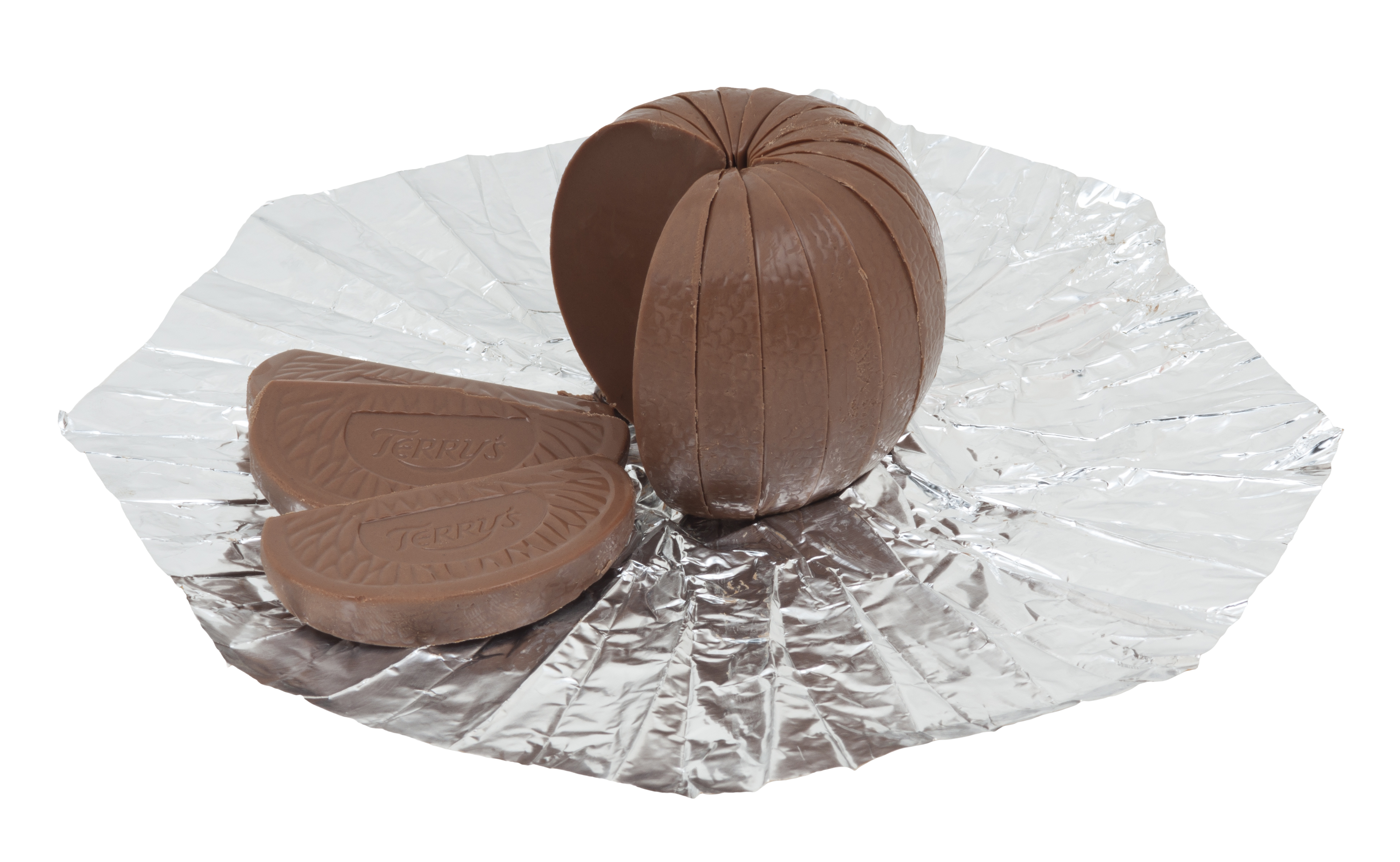
- Product type: Confection
- Current owner: Carambar & Co
- Country: United Kingdom
- Introduced: 1932
- Markets: Worldwide
- Previous owners: Terry's; Kraft General Foods; Catherine foods; Kraft Foods; Mondelēz International

Terry's Chocolate Orange is a chocolate product with orange flavour created by Terry's in 1932 at Terry's Chocolate Works in York, England. The brand has changed ownership several times, and production was moved to Poland in 2005. Since 2018, the Terry's Chocolate Orange has been produced in Strasbourg, France, by Carambar & Co.

== Development ==
Terry's opened the Art Deco-style factory known as Terry's Chocolate Works in York, England in 1926, and began launching new products. These included the Dessert Chocolate Apple (1926), Terry's All Gold (1931) and the Chocolate Orange (1932).

In 1954, production of the chocolate apple was phased out in favour of increased production of the chocolate orange. In 1979, Terry's launched the Chocolate Lemon, but it was withdrawn three years later.

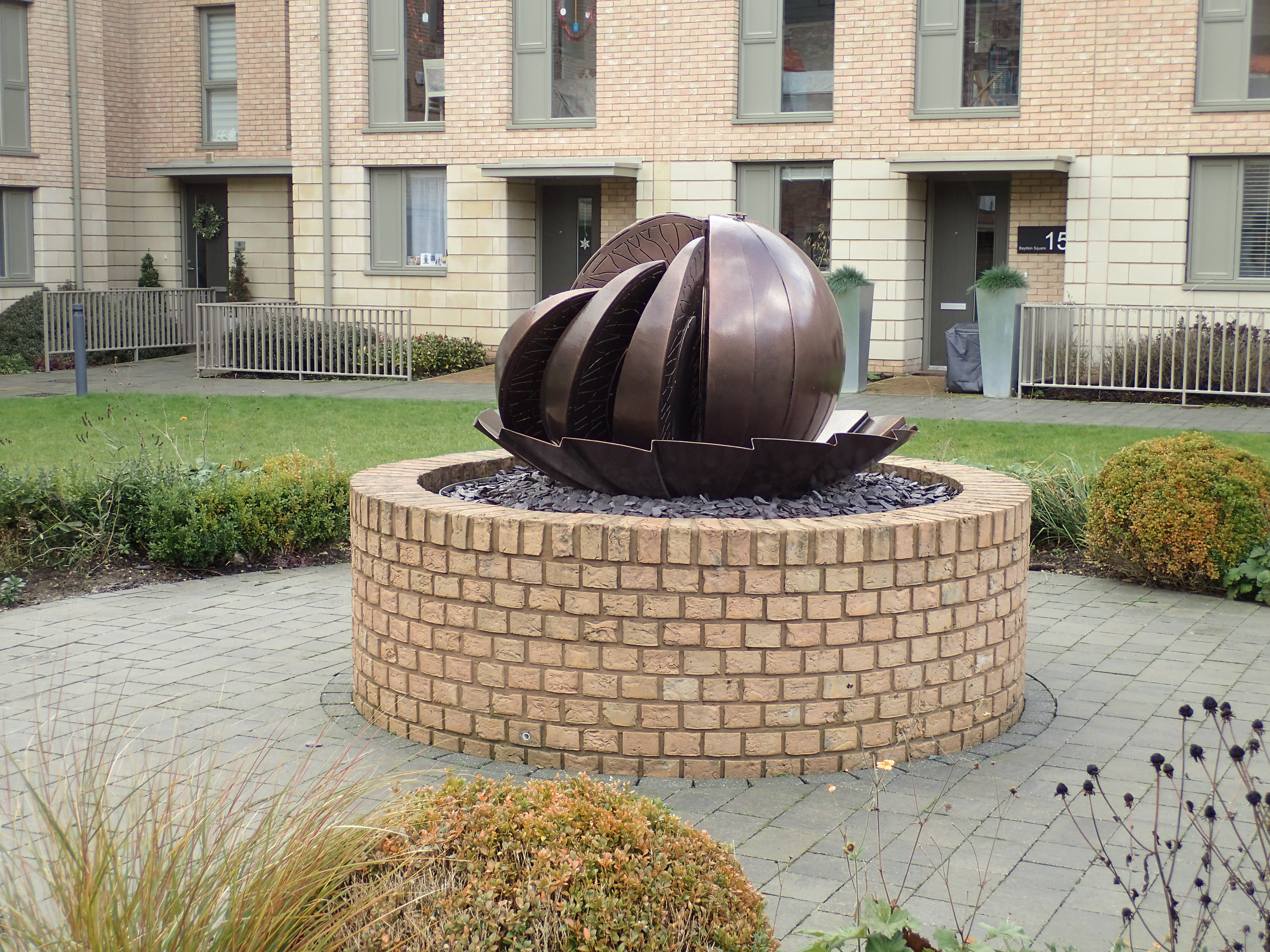
Sculpture of a Terry's Chocolate Orange at The Chocolate Works site in York, England

In the North American market, where it has had a variety of importers over the years, it was briefly sold as a Tobler (maker of the Toblerone) product.

Chocolate oranges appeared on the South Korean market in the GS25 chain of convenience stores in 2017.

2005 saw the closure of the Terry's factory in York, and Chocolate Orange manufacturing was moved to continental Europe by then-owner Kraft Foods. Following the 2016 sale of the brand by Mondelez (one of two successor companies to Kraft Foods Inc., the other being Kraft Foods Group Inc.) to investment company Eurazeo, manufacture was consolidated in 2018 in Strasbourg, France, as a product of Carambar & Co.

The company says that global sales of Terry's Chocolate Oranges doubled from 2019 to 2022, including a tripling of sales in the United States, for a total of 44 million Oranges annually, in countries including the UK, Ireland, the US, Canada, Australia, New Zealand and Japan.

== Structure ==
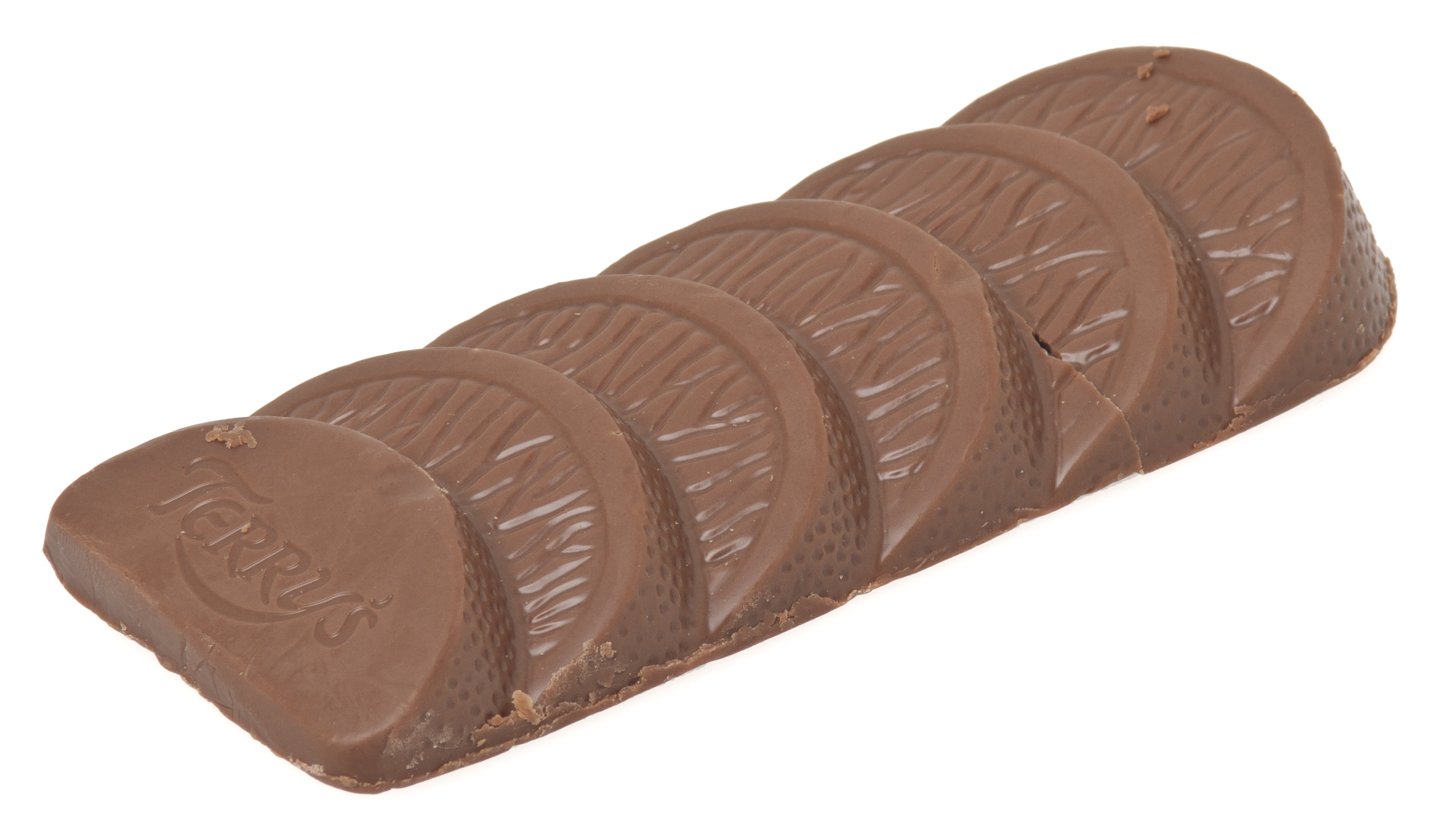
Terry's Chocolate Orange Bar, a chocolate bar version of the Chocolate Orange

The Terry's Chocolate Orange comprises an orange-shaped ball of chocolate mixed with orange oil, divided into twenty segments, similar to a real orange, and wrapped in orange-skin patterned foil. When packaged, the segments are stuck together firmly in the centre; therefore, prior to unwrapping, the ball is traditionally tapped severely on a hard surface to cause the segments to separate from each other (dubbed "Tap and Unwrap" or "Whack and Unwrap").

On 29 May 2016, the UK product size was reduced from 175g to 157g (or 147g in Canada) by changing the moulded shape of each segment to leave an air gap between each piece. Despite this, the price doubled in some retail outlets.

In 2025, the weight was further reduced by 12g to 145g in the UK.

=== Spin-offs ===
There have been a number of spin-off products, currently including:

- Chocolate Orange bar: a bar of six segments, initially produced with smooth vertical segments (similar to a Toblerone bar), then, later, with textured segments that mimic those of the traditional orange shape.
- Chocolate Orange minis: a bag of small segments
- Chocolate Orange White Eggs: egg-shaped white chocolate versions of Chocolate Orange that are available at Easter
- Segsations: individual segments of chocolate in different flavours, including: milk chocolate, puffed rice, honeycomb, cornflake and a "double seg" of layered milk and dark chocolate, all flavoured with orange oil.
- Segsations Mini Eggs: individual foil-wrapped eggs of chocolate in same flavours as Segsations that are available at Easter
- Chocolate Orange – Orange Cream Filled Egg: a milk chocolate egg filled with an orange fondant filling (similar to Cadbury's Creme Egg)
- Chocolate Mint: A mint-flavoured version of the Chocolate Orange.

== Advertising ==
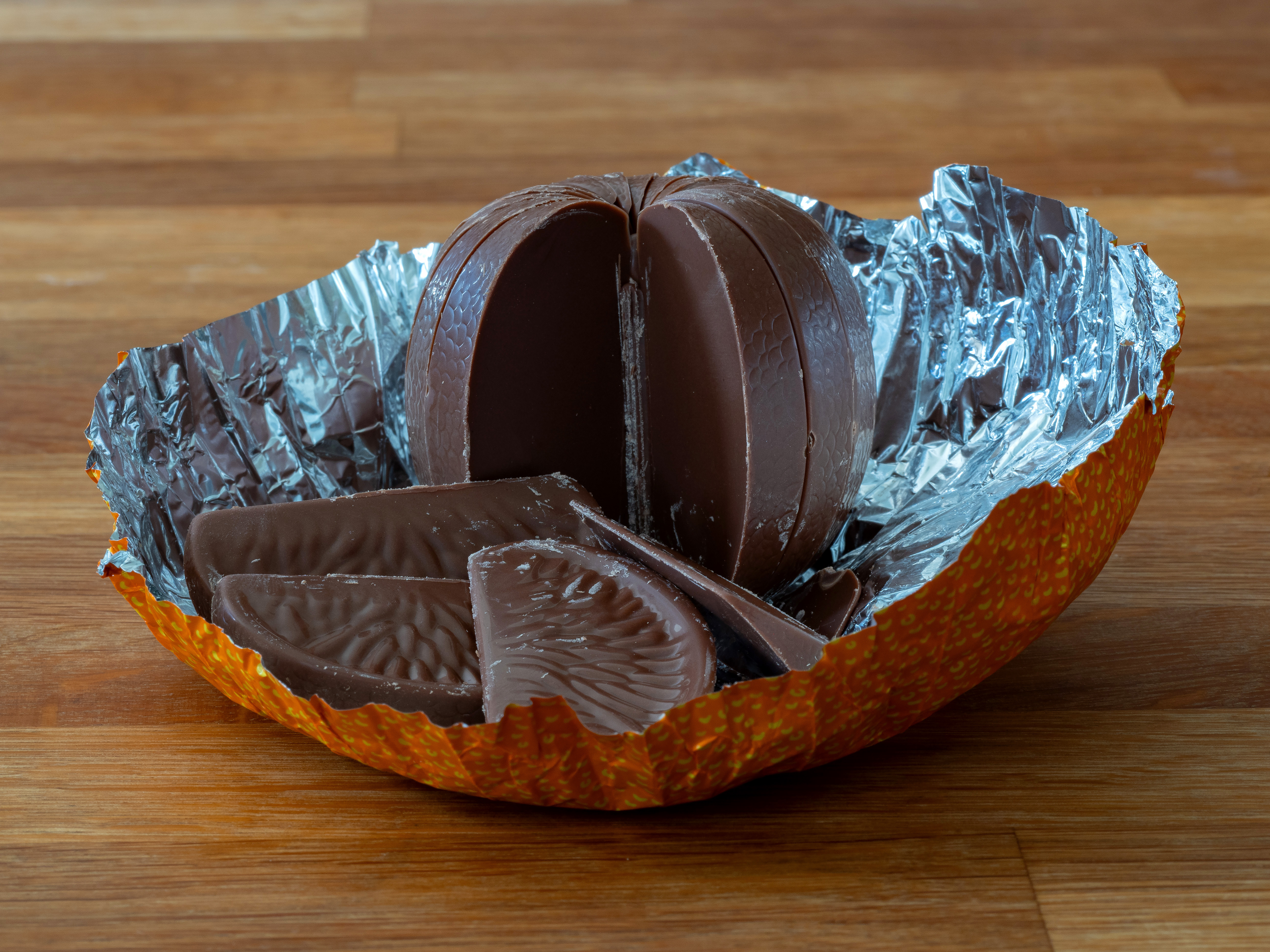
A "tapped and unwrapped" Terry's Chocolate Orange

The Chocolate Orange product is known for its unusual marketing, which is usually at its heaviest around Christmas. At one time it was estimated that the Chocolate Orange was found in a tenth of British Christmas stockings. Actress Dawn French has fronted numerous campaigns for the brand, often in a posed scene of defending and hiding "her" Chocolate Orange from others. Famous marketing phrases include:

- Tap it and unwrap it (since replaced with "whack and unwrap")
- It's not Terry's, it's mine
- Don't tap it... Whack it!

French was dropped from advertising in 2007 due to a corporate rebrand.

Advertisements (after the rebranding) do not feature Dawn French and contain the new slogan "Round but not round for long" (some include the Countdown clock music). Advertising campaigns in the United Kingdom have featured various situations in which people are trying to break the segments of their Terry's Chocolate Orange apart with the slogan "Smash it to pieces, love it to bits".

An advert in 2020, featuring voiceover by Brian Blessed, explains how the Chocolate Orange is a catalyst for "British Unsquaredness", along with a new slogan, "Deliciously Unsquare". In 2023, Terry's launched a stop-motion animated advertising campaign centred around a group of eccentric characters called the "Board of Unsquare", to promote the Chocolate Mint, and later, the Chocolate Milk ball.
