= Neapolitans (chocolate) =

Small wrapped pieces of chocolate

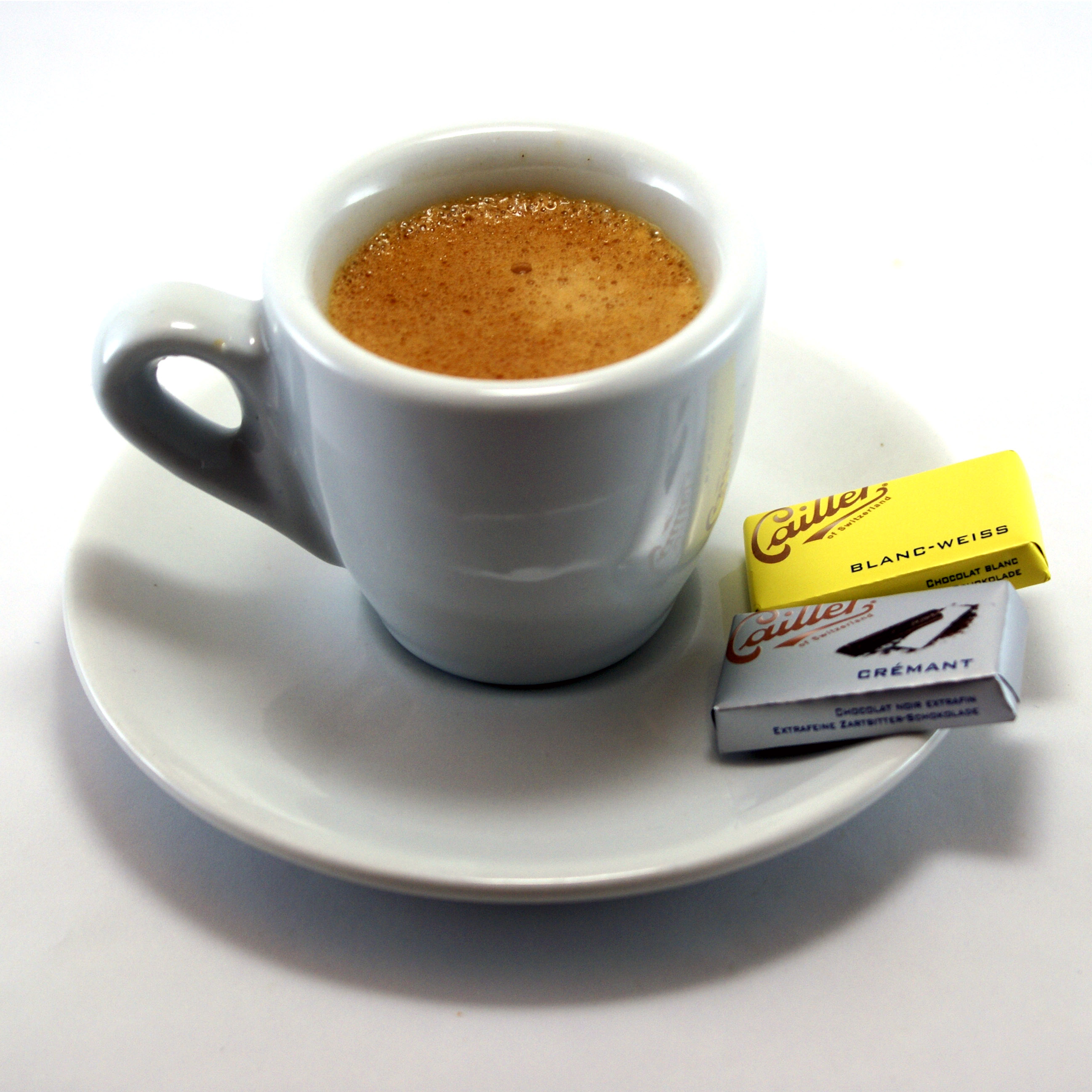
- Neapolitans served with a cup of espresso
- Type: Chocolate

Neapolitans (also Napolitains or Naps) are individually wrapped square or rectangular pieces of chocolate in assorted flavours. They are often served by hotels and coffee shops (often with a cup of coffee) and may feature packaging with customized branding when used for promotional purposes.

Neapolitans are about 3 centimeters (1.2 in) by 2 centimeters (0.79 in) in size, weigh about 5 grams (0.18 oz), and are individually wrapped. They may be of any type of chocolate. According to an Italian journal of 1879, neapolitans were small chocolates individually wrapped in decorative cards and the most exquisite of the chocolates manufactured in Spain, France and Switzerland. Terry's of York, England, first mass-produced neapolitans in 1899. They have since been produced in many flavours by many confectionery companies.

== Name ==
The name "neapolitan" originates from a gift that was made by Louis XVIII in 1819 to Marie-Caroline of Bourbon, a princess from Naples. Each rectangle of chocolate was wrapped individually and featured a view of Naples.

== See also ==
- Neapolitan ice cream
