= Knavesmire Secondary School =

Former secondary school in York, England

Coordinates: 53.933°N 1.091°W

Information
- Established: c. 1965
- Closed: 1980s
- Gender: Girls (1960s)

Knavesmire Secondary School was a secondary modern school based in York, England from the 1960s (c. 1965) to the 1980s. During the 1960s, it was a girls only school. The building was located on Bishopthorpe Road next to York Racecourse, and was taken over by the College of Law in the early 1990s. The by then University of Law moved its north-east campus to Leeds in the 2010s and sold the site. The school is now occupied by OneSchool Global, an independent school connected to the Plymouth Brethren evangelical church. The author Sheelagh Kelly attended the school during the 1960s.
