= York Fruits =

Candy brand of shaped and flavoured jellies

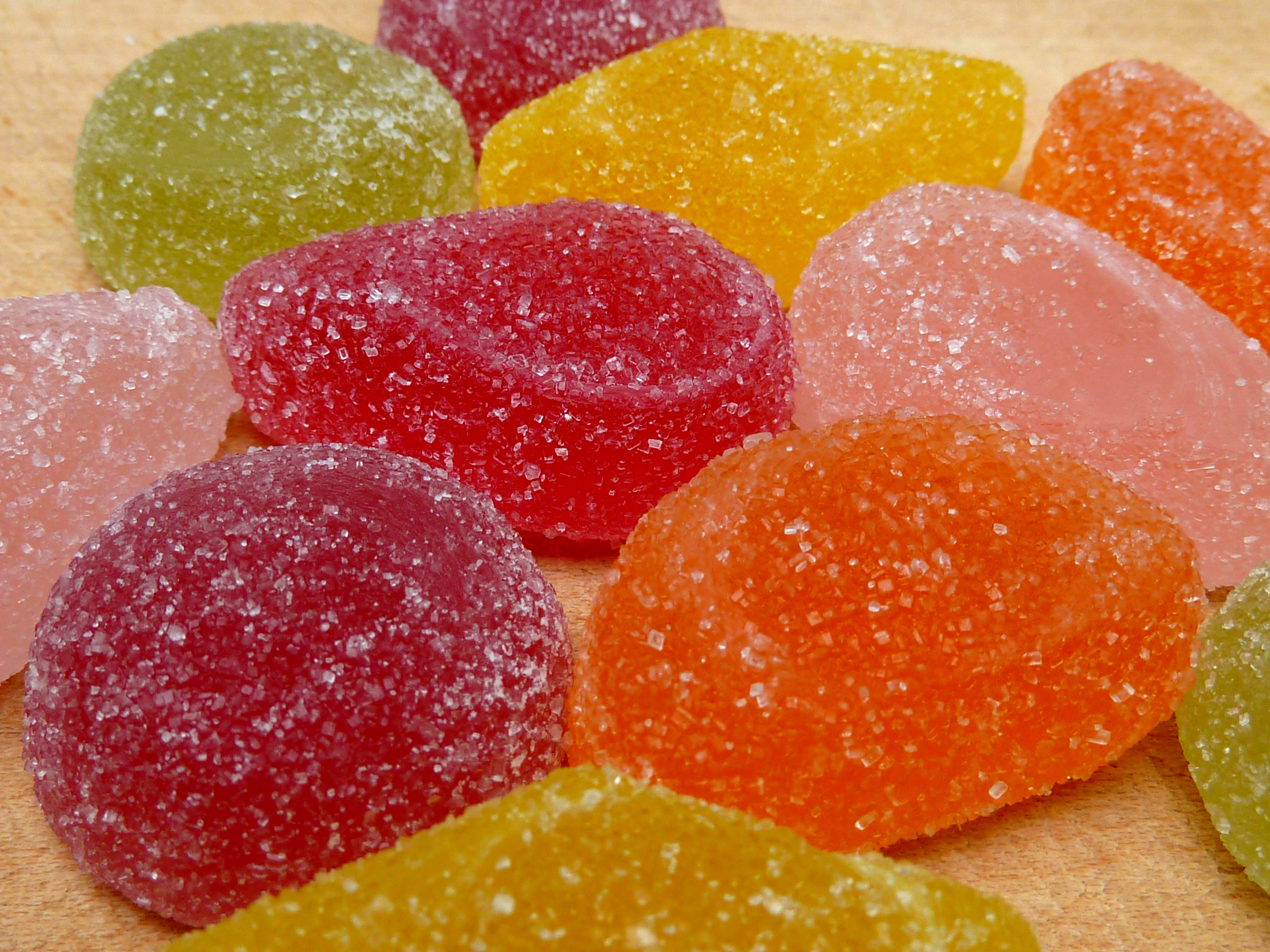
- York Fruits
- Type: Confectionery
- Place of origin: England
- Region or state: Pontefract
- Main ingredients: Sugar
- Ingredients generally used: Glucose syrup
- Food energy (per 200g box serving): 684 kcal (2,860 kJ)
Nutritional value
(per 200g box serving)
- Protein: 0.0 g
- Fat: 0.0 g
- Carbohydrate: 170.4 g
- Other information: Natural colours and flavours. Suitable for vegetarians.

York Fruits are a brand of fruit-flavoured jellies, traditionally popular in Great Britain at Christmas.

== Manufacture ==
The sweets were formerly made by Terry's of York, and more recently by Kraft Foods (1993–2008) and Smith Kendon in Lancaster (2008–2012). The brand was acquired by Tangerine Confectionery in 2012. Tangerine Confectionery was bought by Valeo Confectionery in 2018.

== Sweets ==
The box contains 200g, or approximately 22 sweets, about the size of chocolates. The sugar-coated jellies are manufactured in circular, half-moon, teardrop and diamond shapes and are flavoured lemon, raspberry, strawberry, mandarin, lime and cherry. (Note: Flavour and shape information printed on box)
