= Copper Dragon Brewery =

Brewery in Skipton, North Yorkshire, England

Coordinates: 53.9443°N 2.0143°W

- Copper Dragon Brewery Logo
- Founded: 2002
- Headquarters: Skipton, North Yorkshire, England
- Owner: Copper Dragon Brewery. (independent)
- Website: copperdragon.co.uk

Copper Dragon Brewery is a brewery originally established in Skipton, North Yorkshire, in 2002.

The brewery produces four permanent cask ales: Golden Pippin, a blonde beer at 3.9% abv, also available in 500ml bottles, Best Bitter a traditional Northern-style ale at 3.8% abv, also available in 500ml bottles, Scott's 1816, created to commemorate the original Skipton brewery, and Silver Myst a 4.0% pilsner.

After a period in Keighley, Copper Dragon Brewery returned to Skipton in October 2020. in association with Recoil Brewing Co. of Clitheroe, Lancashire, and the original brewing team of Gordon Wilkinson, Dave Sanders and Matthew Taylor.

== Beers ==
Beer Name	Style	abv
Best Bitter	Bitter	3.8%(cask) , 4.0% (bottled)
Golden Pippin	Blonde	3.9%(cask) , 4.2% (bottled)
Scott's 1816	Bitter	4.4% (bottled)
Silver Myst	Pilsner	4.0% (cask)
Sidewinder	Pale ale	4.2% (cask)
Black Gold	Bitter	4.0% (cask)

== Recoil Craft Brewery ==
Although the Copper Dragon team relocated back to Skipton from their Recoil base, Recoil is now being used by Copper Dragon to build a sub-brand of craft beers.

Beer Name	Style	abv
Antidote	Blonde	3.8%(cask)
White Snake	Pale ale	3.9%(cask) , 4.2% (bottled)

== 2019 Festival Beers ==
In 2019 Copper Dragon made some new pale ales available, these were:

Penny Pale (3.5%), described as a pale ale made with Cascade and Dana hops.

Sidewinder (4.2%), an American pale ale, using Cascade, Simco and Magnum hops.

13 Steps (4.1%), another pale ale, this being produced in a limited edition though its not clear how limited.

They were all readily available at the 2019 Skipton Beer Festival, the festival nearest to the brewery's home. Only Sidewinder is now on the normal product list (see table above).
