= Terry's All Gold =

Brand of boxed chocolates

Terry's All Gold was an assorted chocolate box originally made by Terry's, subsequently by Carambar & Co and discontinued in 2020.

== Introduction ==
The archives of Kraft Foods/Mondelēz International, who owned the Terry's brand between 1993 and 2016, list it as having been introduced in the United Kingdom in 1931, other sources give the date as 1932 or 1936, and it has since been a "top brand". Advertising slogans used for the product include "See the face you love light up with Terry's All Gold." Terry's All Gold was discontinued by Carambar in 2020 to focus instead on the Terry's Chocolate Orange range.

== Description ==
The chocolates were sold in boxes of 454 grams (16 oz) or 380 grams (13.4 oz). A 380 g box contained 1938 calories.

== In popular culture ==
Terry's All Gold was the sponsor of the Ebor Handicap at York Racecourse in 1974 and 1975. Terry's also launched a hot air balloon to promote All Gold. It had the registration G-GOLD and in May 1978 it finished second in the first Cross Channel Balloon Race.

In "Holy", the Christmas episode of the TV series Bottom, Terry's All Gold was one of the gifts given by the 'three kings'.

In the second episode of the first series of Early Doors, Jean sings the song from the advert while opening a box of All Gold.
