= Eurazeo =

French investment company

Eurazeo SE
- Type: Public
- Traded as: Euronext Paris: RF; CAC Mid 60 Component
- ISIN: FR0000121121
- Industry: Private equity
- Founded: 2001
- Headquarters: Paris, France
- Area served: Worldwide
- Key people: Jean-Charles Decaux (Chairman of the Supervisory Board); Olivier Merveilleux du Vignaux (Chair of the Executive Board)
- AUM: €35 billion (2023)
- Number of employees: 410 (2023)
- Website: www.eurazeo.com

Eurazeo is a French private equity firm and investment group headquartered in Paris. It holds a diversified portfolio of €35 billion in assets under management, including €23 billion from third parties, invested in more than 600 companies.

== History ==
=== Origins ===
Gaz et Eaux was founded in 1881 and specialized in the distribution of water and gas in western and northern France. Following the nationalization of gas in 1945, it kept its water activity until 1976, when it gradually changed from a portfolio company at the end of the 1970s, to a pure investment company in the 1990s. It was renamed Azeo in 1999.

Eurafrance, was founded as an investment company in 1969. It became a shareholder of Azeo in 1985 and increased its shareholding on a regular basis until a full takeover bid was launched at the end of 2000. In 2002, Eurafrance and its subsidiary Azeo formally merged to become Eurazeo.

=== Formation of Eurazeo ===
Between 2001 and 2005, Eurazeo launched three successive major merger operations, giving a more defined shape to the newly created group. At the very inception of the Group in 2001, Eurafrance absorbed Azeo, then in 2004, Eurazeo absorbed Rue Impériale. This was quickly followed in 2005, by the addition of the business of Ateliers de Construction du Nord de la France (ANF). In May 2001, Eurazeo disposed of its holdings in Generali and Mediobanca.

In 2003, Eurazeo acquired Fraikin Group, and in April it acquired 23% of Eutelsat from France Telecom. The same year, Eurazeo acquired Buffalo Grill at a price of €20 per share. With the Carlyle Group, it invested in Terreal.

In 2004, Eurazeo merged with Rue Impériale, which it absorbed. Fraikin Group was securitized to repay the debt raised for its purchase.

In 2005, Eurazeo acquired Ateliers de Construction du Nord de la France (ANF). It took full control of Rexel with mandatory delisting. Eurazeo sold its stake in Lazard. Eurazeo acquired a first tranche of Accor, then of B&B Hotels. Later in the year, Eurazeo sold Terreal, followed by IRR (Capital International Real Returns) – an investment company acquired in 1997 – and BBS Capital, acquired in 1998.

At the time, Eurazeo's strategy consisted in selling historical investments (Generali, Mediobanca, Lazard and Terreal), while at the same time investing in a wide range of companies (Rexel, ANF, Eutelsat, Accor and B&B Hotels).

In 2006, Eurazeo stepped up its European expansion through the acquisition of operators present in European markets. That year, it acquired Europcar Europe's number one car rental company, 2006; in 2007, it acquired APCOA Parking, the European leader in parking lot management; and much later, in 2016, it acquired Grape Hospitality, manager of 87 hotels in eight European countries.

In 2006, Eurazeo acquired 20% of Banca Leonardo, an Italian bank focused on the Italian private equity market, and created Euraleo, a 50/50 joint-venture. Eurazeo Co-Investment Partners was created and Fraikin Group was sold to CVC Capital Partners.

In 2009, Eurazeo sold its Danone shares through the issuance of bonds exchangeable for shares.

In 2010, Eurazeo acquired Fonroche Énergie, and sold B&B Hotels to Carlyle.

Through the acquisition of OFI Private Equity Capital, Eurazeo created the "Eurazeo PME" division which took over the companies initially controlled by OFI Private Equity Capital. Jointly with Bridgepoint, Eurazeo acquired Foncia. Eurazeo sold all its shares in Ipsos (via the holding company LT Participations), then acquired 3S Photonics and Moncler. Between 2012 and 2014, Eurazeo sold Rexel in stages.

In 2013, Eurazeo sold its entire holding in Edenred, then acquired IES and Péters Surgical. In 2016, the brands Carambar, Terry's, Kréma, La Pie qui Chante, Malabar, Vichy Pastilles, Suchard chocolates, and Poulain chocolate were acquired by Eurazeo from Mondelez International with the brands subsequently being grouped under the brand name Carambar & Co to create a new confectionery group.

On 29 November 2017, Eurazeo invested close to €100 million in Rhône Group, a US and UK investment firm, for 30% of the company's capital. One month later, on 29 December 2017, Eurazeo announced the acquisition of a 70% interest in Idinvest Partners, thereby doubling the amount of its assets under management, from €8 billion to €16 billion. These two large-scale acquisitions coincided with Virginie Morgon's full assumption of office at the head of the company on 19 March 2018. Patrick Sayer had led Eurazeo for fifteen years.

In 2017, Eurazeo acquired Dominion Web Solutions, a software provider to commercial and recreational dealers. Eurazeo then acquired IberChem, a Spanish manufacturer of perfumes and fragrances in emerging markets. Following on from this, the acquisition of a majority interest in Nest Fragrances was announced in November 2017. At the same time Eurazeo's subsidiary, Novacap, acquired Chemoxy (United Kingdom) then Produits Chimiques et Auxiliaires de Synthèse (PCAS), two chemical groups. In December 2021 it was announced that Eurazeo had acquired majority ownership and operational control of the consumer goods firm Beekman 1802 of Schenectady, New York. Beekman 1802 was founded by Josh Kilmer-Purcell and Dr. Brent Ridge known as the Beekman Boys who will retain creative and brand control.
