= La Pie qui Chante =

French brand of confectionery

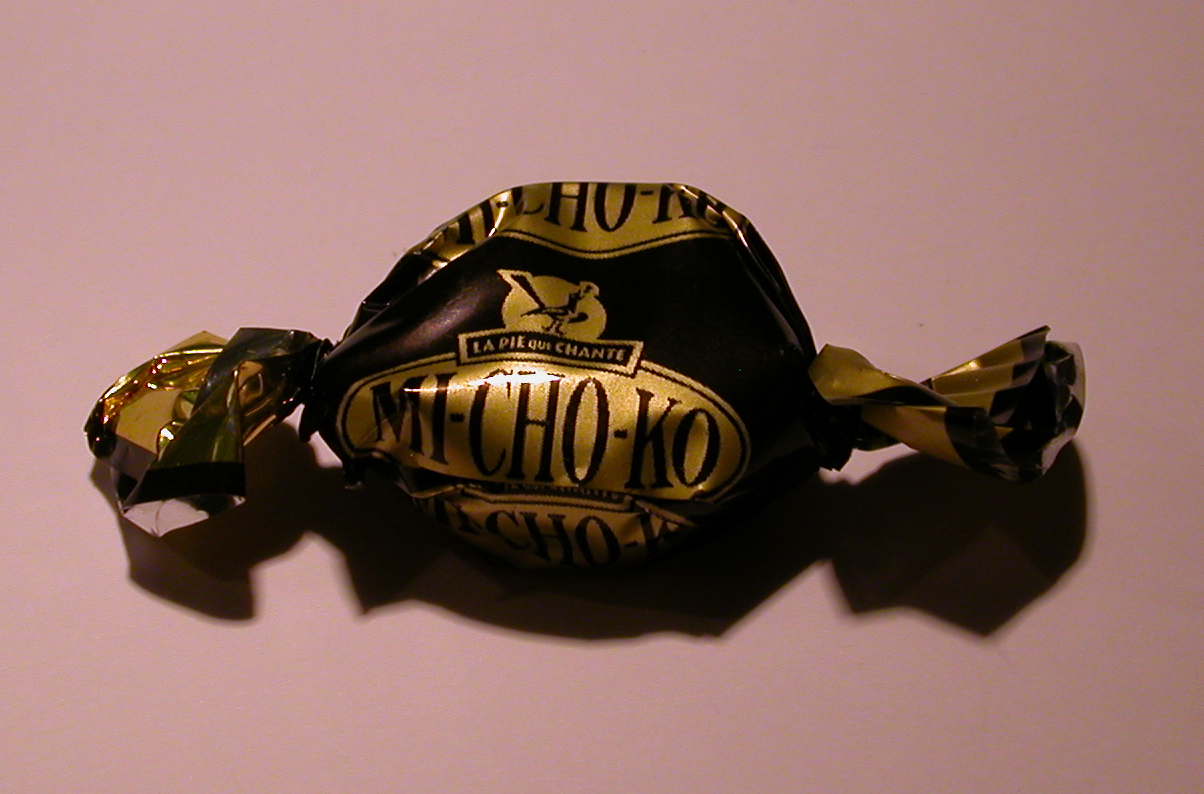
- Company type: Private
- Industry: Food company
- Area served: France

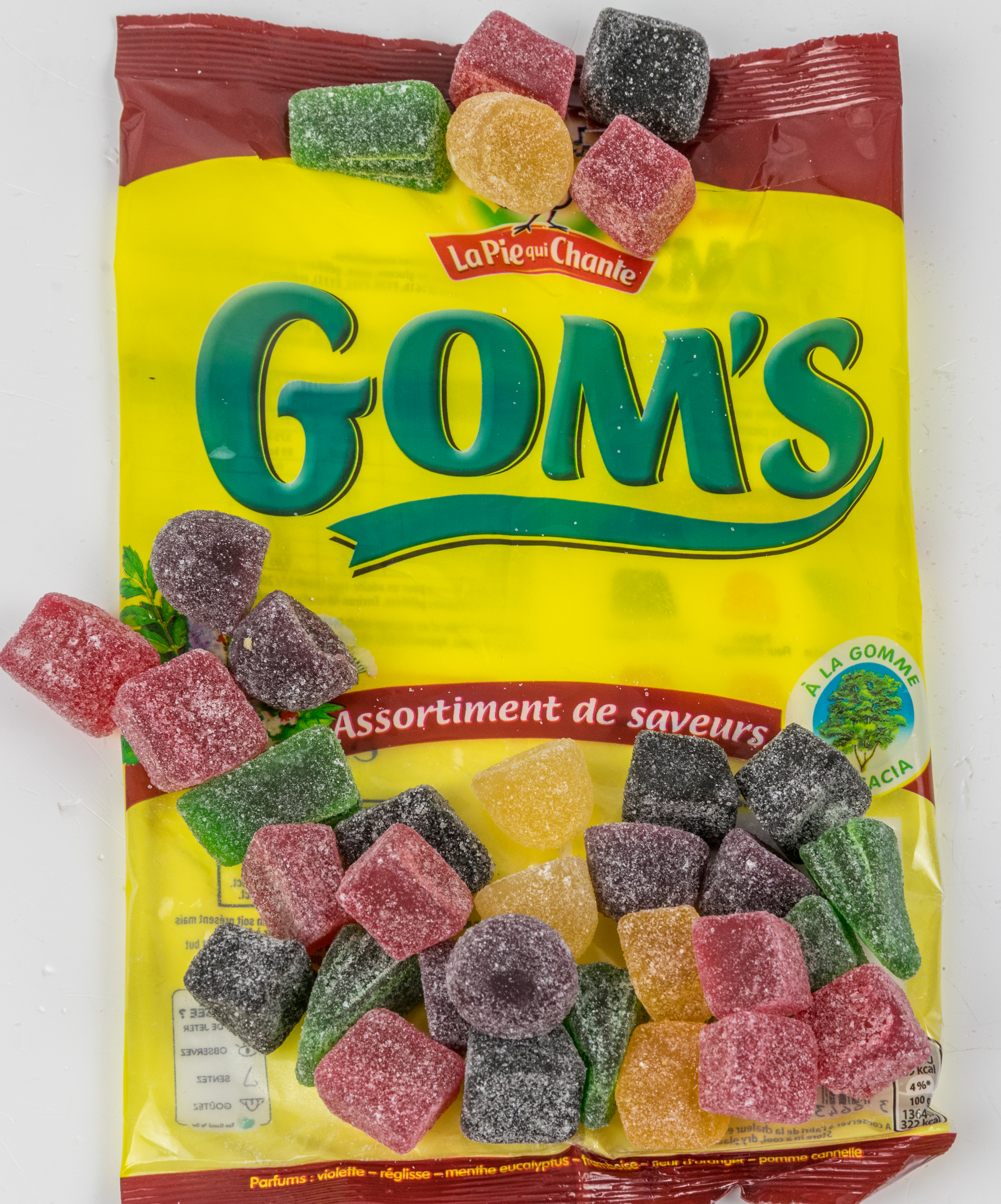
Gom's - Assortiment de saveurs

La Pie qui Chante (English: The Singing Magpie), is a French brand of confectionery, since 2017 owned by Carambar & Co.

== History ==
In 1860, Emile Cornillot started creating handmade confectionery from premises on rue Colbert, Lille, specializing in bonbons. The quality of the sweets meant that in 1885, he moved to larger premises on rue de l'Hôpital militaire.

After the signing of the Franco-Russian Alliance in 1893, his son Louis starts marketing the sweets in Russia under the FRANCORUSSE brand. A second factory and a second store opened in Paris in 1901.

On the death of his father Louis, his 19-year-old son George took over from his father. Wishing to diversify, in 1925 the company acquired the Marseille company La Pie qui Chante, which produced caramels. In 1927, in light of growing fear of the Bolsheviks, George changed the name of the company to La Pie qui Chante.

Following construction of the Hotel de Lille on the site of their factory, the company left Paris in 1933 for a new factory base in Wattignies. Once the move was complete, the Marseille factory was also closed. This allowed an expansion in production, and the release of its most famous sweet, Mi-cho-ko, produced from 1936.

At the onset of World War Two, the factory became a military supply depot for the British Army. After the Nazi occupation and the creation of Vichy France, women prisoners produced fresh candies (dates, figs) until the end of the war. In 1943 the company created a country club for employees, the future Promises community centre.

The family resumed control post war, and created a national sales network in 1955, supported by their first national level advertising campaigns on both radio and in newspapers. In 1960, the company received the diploma Prestige of France.

From 1959 to 1965, run by George's son Pierre, the company introduces a series of employee friendly employment contract developments, including a dropping of production targets and an automatic inclusion of enhanced bonuses.

In 1965, the company merges with other French confectionery brands that include KBO, Mob's, Femina and Clausse, under the ownership of General Foods. In 1972, fellow brand La société Delespaul-Havez is merged with La Pie qui Chante. After completion of the deal, the last member of the Cornillot to sit on the companies board retires, ending an association of 113 years.

In 1973, General Food joins the General Occidental group that is then transferred to BSN, later part of Groupe Danone. In 1997, the company was sold to Cadbury.

The Wattignies factory was closed in 2003, with production transferred to Marcq-en-Barœul.

In 2010, Cadbury came under the ownership of the American company Kraft Foods.

In 2016, the brands Carambar, Terry's, Kréma, La Pie qui Chante, Malabar, Vichy Pastilles, Suchard chocolates, and Poulain chocolate were acquired by Eurazeo from Mondelez International with the brands subsequently being grouped under the brand name Carambar & Co to create a new confectionery group.
