= Malabar (chewing gum) =

French brand of chewing gum

- Type: Chewing gum
- Course: Snack
- Place of origin: France
- Region or state: Eure et Loire
- Created by: Kréma
- Main ingredients: Sugar

Malabar is a French brand of chewing gum, launched in 1958 by Kréma. It is since 2017 owned by Carambar & Co.

The brand was purchased by Cadbury-Schweppes in 2000 from Kraft Foods. In 2016, the brands Carambar, Terry's, Kréma, La Pie qui Chante, Malabar, Vichy Pastilles, Suchard chocolates, and Poulain chocolate were acquired by Eurazeo from Mondelez International with the brands subsequently being grouped under the brand name Carambar & Co to create a new confectionery group.
