= Kréma =

French confectionery brand

- Type: Confectionery
- Place of origin: France
- Main ingredients: Sugar, glucose syrup, hydrogenated vegetable oil, gelatin, skim milk powder

Kréma is a French brand of confectionery, owned by Carambar & Co.

== History ==
Kréma was best known in the period from 1950 to 1970, particularly under the Mint'Ho brand of caramel white mints. Alternative Bat'na combines white and brown caramel, while Regliss' combines white and black licorice.

The Mint'ho was characterized by the fact that, alone of all the sweets made at this time, it floated on water. This was due to the expansion of micro-air bubbles that made it easy to chew. Since the manufacturing process has changed over time, the mints no longer float. Mint'ho is prohibited by some religions, including Judaism, because it contains animal gelatin and emulsifiers.

The brand was purchased by Cadbury-Schweppes in 2000 from Kraft Foods. In 2016, the brands Carambar, Terry's, Kréma, La Pie qui Chante, Malabar, Vichy Pastilles, Suchard chocolates, and Poulain chocolate were acquired by Eurazeo from Mondelez International with the brands subsequently being grouped under the brand name Carambar & Co to create a new confectionery group.

== Flavours ==
Kréma is available in various flavours, including cherry, lemon, raspberry, orange, caramel, pomegranate, iced tea, peach and apple.

== Ingredients ==
Sugar, glucose syrup, hydrogenated vegetable fat, gelatin, skim milk powder, licorice extract, citric acid (acidifier), flavorings: E150c, E104, E129, E124, E110, E133; dyes: E471; soya lecithin ( emulsifier), salt, sodium bicarbonate (acidity)
