= Kimetsan =

- Type: Private
- Industry: Chemicals, Metallurgy, Mining
- Founded: 1986 Ankara, Turkey
- Founder: Dr.Erol Ozensoy
- Headquarters: Ankara, Turkey
- Key people: Dr.Erol Ozensoy Erdem Duhan Özensoy
- Revenue: -
- Net income: -
- Website: http://www.kimetsan.com/

Kimetsan is a chemical companies in Turkey. In terms of product number, the company is the biggest manufacturer of laboratory chemicals in Turkey. The company has also one of the most advanced technologys in waterborne coatings, leading to involve in JSF project. Furthermore, the company supplies low VOC waterborne coatings to NASA.

Also, the company is representative of other European and America-based companies. Those companies are PMC Specialties Group Inc. USA, Molecular Products Ltd / UK, Chemoxy International Ltd, Brotherton Specialty Products Ltd / England, Church and Dwight / USA, Abbey Color / USA, R & G Chemicals Ltd / UK, ARMEX Europe / UK, Aqua Surface Technology Ltd / UK.

== Products ==
The company published, 2300 different products on the website for different areas of applications. Kimetsan's major production segments are;

1. Fine Chemicals

2. Paint & Pigments

3. Specialty Chemicals

4. Organic Chemicals Synthesis

5. Drugs

6. Cosmetic Chemicals

7. Food Additives

8. Agricultural Chemicals

9. Electronic Industry Chemicals

10. Military Purpose Chemicals

11. Electro Chemicals

12. Inorganic Chemicals

13. Industrial Chemicals And Additives

14. Photographic Chemicals

15. Industrial Cleaning And Protection Chemicals

16. R & D And Laboratory Chemicals

17. Corrosion Inhibitors

18. Heavy Corrosion Resistant Coatings
