= Carambar & Co =

French confectionery company

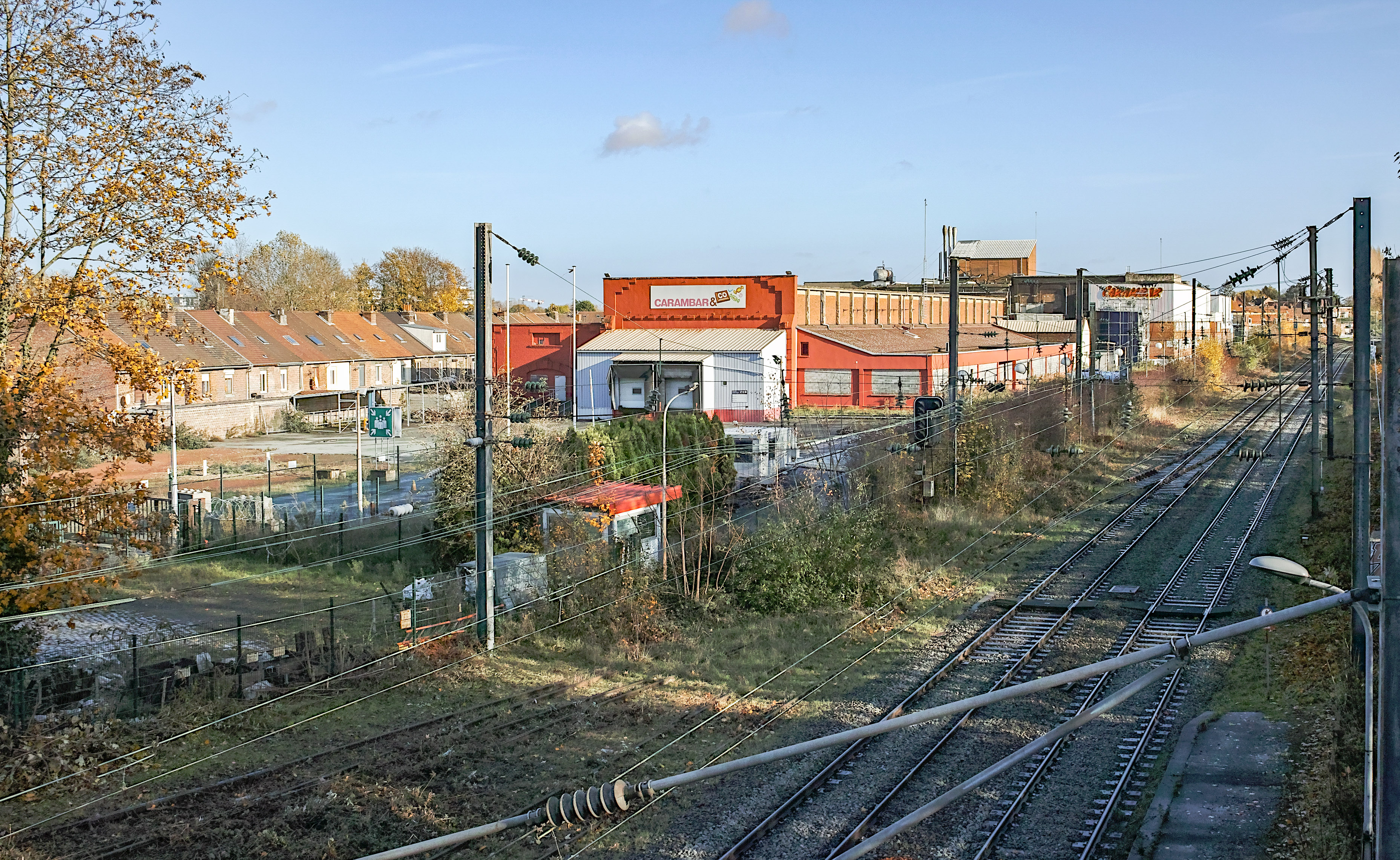
- Factory in Marcq-en-Barœul, France
- Traded as: Private company
- Industry: Confectionery
- Founded: 2016
- Headquarters: Issy-les-Moulineaux
- Area served: Global
- Brands: Dulciora; Kréma; Lutti; Malabar; Michoko; La pie qui chante; Poulain; Suchard; Terry's; Vichy
- Owner: Ferrero SpA
- Website: carambarco.com/en

Carambar & Co, or CPK (Carambar Poulain Krema), is a French confectionery company founded in 2016. It brings together confectionery brands such as Carambar, Terry's, Lutti, Kréma, La Pie qui Chante, Malabar, Vichy Pastilles, Suchard chocolates, and Poulain chocolate. Carambar & Co has been owned by Ferrero SpA since October 2025 and is run as a separate subsidiary.

== History ==
In 2016, an investment consortium led by French investment firm Eurazeo bought a set of confectionery brands from American multinational food conglomerate Mondelēz International, and on 2 May that year they were formally amalgamated to form Carambar & Co. The consortium also included Patrick Mispolet and Matthieu Maillot, former president and former CFO respectively of Orangina-Schweppes France, and Pierre Le Tanneur, former director of Spotless Group. The brands purchased by the investors were:

- Carambar, makers of the eponymous chocolate caramel bar, from whom the new company took their name;
- Kréma, manufacturers of fruit bonbons and Malabar chewing gum;
- La Pie qui Chante, a French confectioner known for Michoko caramels;
- Vichy Pastilles mints;
- Chocolat Poulain, a French chocolatier;
- Chocolat Suchard, a Swiss chocolatier and the original creator of Milka, though that brand was retained by Mondelēz;
- Terry's, originally based in York, famous for their Terry's Chocolate Orange.

As well as these brands, the consortium bought five French factories, each making products for different brands:

- Strasbourg (Bas-Rhin), manufacturing Suchard and Terry's products;
- Blois (Loir-et-Cher) manufacturing Poulain chocolate;
- Vichy (Allier) for Vichy pastilles;
- Marcq-en-Barœul (Nord) for Carambars;
- Saint-Genest-d'Ambière (Vienne) for Kréma and La Pie qui Chante confectionery.

This allowed all production to be moved to France—beforehand under Mondelēz, production had been exported throughout Europe, including in the Czech Republic, Poland and Spain. Since 2018, all Carambar & Co products have been manufactured in France.

In late August 2018, the company announced its acquisition of Lutti, subject to approval from competition authorities. The acquisition of Lutti, the third-largest confectionery company in France, by Carambar, the second-largest, was finalized in October 2018.

In October 2025, Ferrero SpA bought Carambar and Co from Eurazeo for €240 million.
