= Peter Steiner =

Peter Steiner may refer to:

- Peter Steiner (singer) (1917–2007)
- Peter Steiner (cartoonist) (born 1940), American cartoonist
- Peter O. Steiner (1922–2010), American economist
