= Fonroche Énergie =

French company

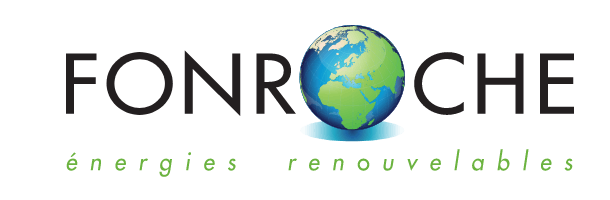
- Industry: engineering, technical studies
- Founded: 2008
- Founder: Yann Maus
- Headquarters: Roquefort, France
- Products: Renewable energy
- Revenue: 257,156,477 €
- Owner: Yann Maus (52%), Eurazeo (39%), others (9%)
- Number of employees: 200 people
- Website: http://www.fonroche.fr/en

Fonroche Énergie is a French company, founded in 2008 by Yann Maus. Its headquarters are in Roquefort, Lot-et-Garonne, in the French department of Lot-et-Garonne. Its core business is renewable and alternative energy.

== History ==
The company was founded in 2008 by Yann Maus.

In 2009, the first production line of 25 MWp photovoltaic modules was inaugurated. The same year, Fonroche Investments, an investment subsidiary dedicated to the production of solar energy, supported its first fund-raising projects.

In 2010, the French investment company Eurazeo become partner of Fonroche capital, investing €50 million over two years. A second production line was launched in Roquefort, allowing the company to increase its production capacity to 90 MWp per year.

2011 was a year of transition for Fonroche. In fact, the group extended its activities to an international scale by opening several subsidiaries in Europe (Switzerland, Spain and Ukraine), in Africa (Benin), in Asia (notably India), in the United States and in the Caribbean (Puerto Rico). Fonroche has diversified its activities, extending them to new sources of renewable energy: biogas and geothermal heat. The same year, Fonroche launched a new range of solar products dedicated to public lighting (mostly solar street lamps).

In 2012, Fonroche launched a program called "New energy to power the future". The company concluded with the Kazakh company Zhambyl Hydro Energo the future installation of a multi-technology 24 MWp photovoltaic power plant. In the same year, Fonroche established a joint-venture with the Indian company PR Clean Energy and collaborated with Mahindra Group on a 5 MWp photovoltaic-based power plant in Bikaner (Rajasthan).

== Fonroche's ownership ==
- Yann Maus: 52%
- Eurazeo: 39%
- Others: 9%

== Headquarters ==
Fonroche Énergie follows the ecological philosophy and the use of renewable energy it advocates. The whole of its major French industrial site is running on positive energy through the use of many innovative products: LED lighting, autonomous solar lights for the parking lots, heat recovery, photovoltaic roof; the entire installation produces 2.1 MWc. The solar panel production factory is also ISO-certified (ISO 14001 and ISO 9001) and has a production capacity of 90 Mwp. This ranks Fonroche as one of the French leaders of solar panel manufacturing.

== Activities ==
The 30th largest company in the French region of Aquitaine, Fonroche has several activities in the field of renewable energy: photovoltaics, off-grid lighting, biogas, geothermal heat.

=== Photovoltaics ===
Since its foundation in 2009, Fonroche Énergie has worked in the production of photovoltaic energy. The company ensures the success of every photovoltaic project, in all its phases: the study, the implementation of the system (power plants, panels, etc.), and its maintenance.

=== Off-grid lighting ===
In 2012, Fonroche Énergie, through its subsidiary Fonroche Environnement Urbain, revealed to the market a range of passive solar lighting, called Illum'in. It is an intelligent photovoltaic candelabra, manufactured in France. It minimizes the impact of public lighting on the environment and enables municipalities to save money, because its requires less maintenance than a conventional, electric, installation. Fonroche has also developed within the same range, solar candelabras dedicated to tropical countries as well as street furniture (range Urb'in) with relocatable anchors.

=== Biogas ===
Fonroche is not just specialised in photovoltaics. The company has diversified its activities towards other renewable energy sources such as biogas. It began with this activity in early 2012, signing a partnership agreement with a Danish company specialized in waste-to-energy.

=== Geothermal heat ===
Fonroche Géothermie is positioned on the market of high-temperature geothermal heating. The company started this activity in 2012, projecting to invest about €400 million over the next 10 years. Since this decision, the company has obtained exploration licenses for two high-temperature geothermal sites. The French government has granted the first license in early 2013 for a site near Pau (department of Pyrénées-Atlantique, region of Aquitaine); in June 2013, Fonroche also received a second geothermal exploration license, called “permis de Strasbourg”.

As a side project, Fonroche is exploring possibilities to mine Lithium from the geothermal brines.

== ISOCEL project ==
Fonroche Énergie takes part in the ISOCEL research project, coordinated by the French chemical company Arkema and by the ADEME (French Environment and Energy Management Agency). This project aims to promote the use of polymer technology for protection and encapsulation of photovoltaic cells. Fourteen partners are involved in it.
