= Erdem Duhan Özensoy =

Turkish businessman and industrialist (born 1988)

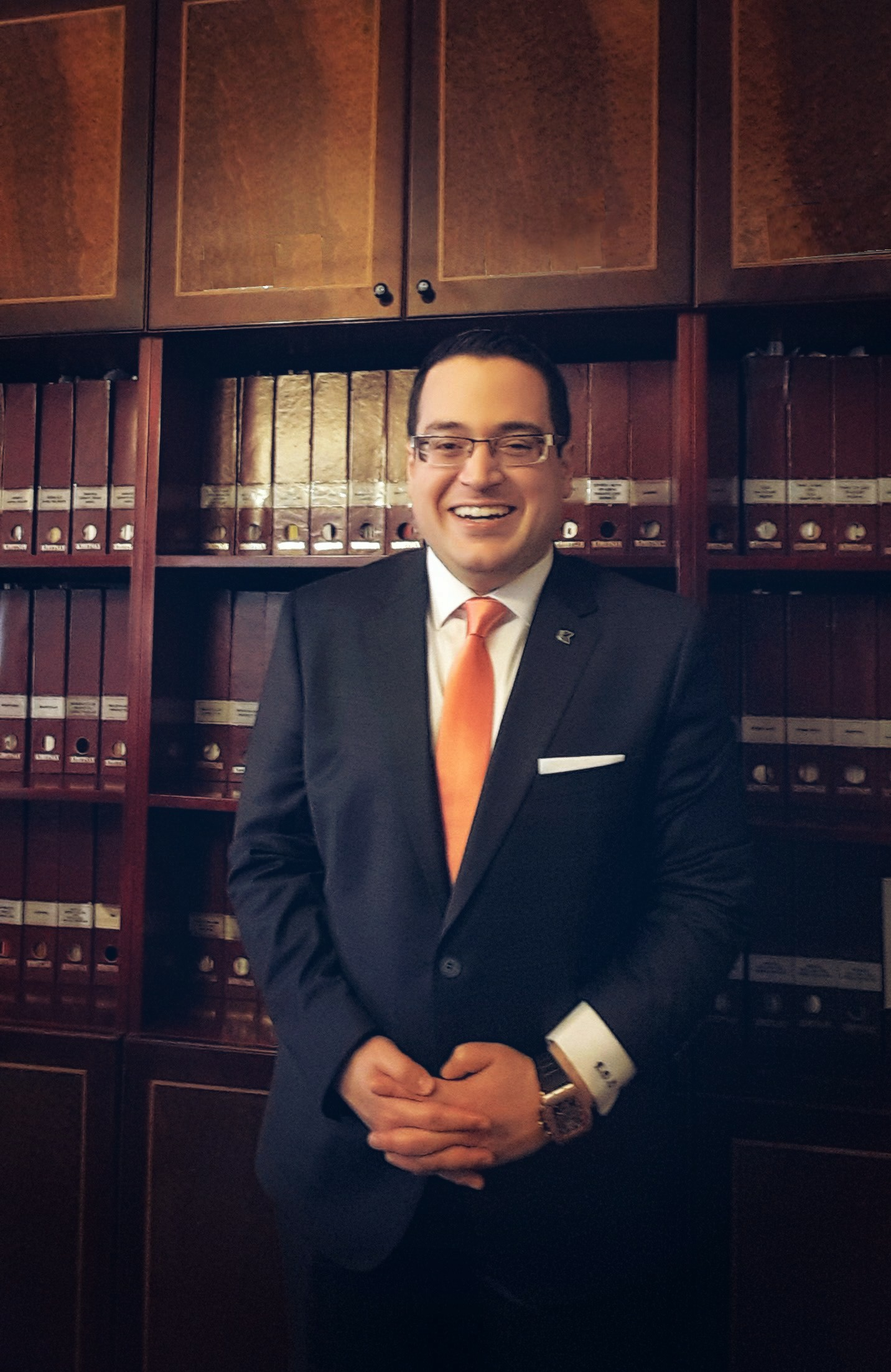
- Duhan in Kimetsan HQ in Ankara, 2015
- Born: 27 July 1988 (age 38); Ankara, Turkey
- Education: TED Ankara College
- Alma mater: Middle East Technical University (BS)
- Organization(s): Kimetsan; Finovtech; ED Capital
- Parents: Erol Özensoy (father); Hatice Özensoy (mother)

Erdem Duhan Özensoy (born 1988) is a Turkish businessman and industrialist. Born in Ankara as the only son of one of Erol Özensoy, he attended high school at TED Ankara College. Duhan then studied at the Middle East Technical University and received his B.Sc. in Metallurgy & Materials Engineering with honors degree. Duhan is known for his works in stealth technology and low observability materials for the defence industry. He is currently a board member of Kimetsan company.

== Career ==
Following his education Duhan started his career in Kimetsan. He worked in many defence projects over years. In 2020 Duhan had founded a new company in Finance sector named as Finovtech. Finovtech is known for high frequency trading, algorithmic trading, market making and liquidity providing.

Net worth of Duhan has increased to US$450 million in 2021.

Duhan founded ED Capital with license of the Capital Market Boards of Türkiye (SPK) in August 2024. Company is specialized in Asset Management, Management of Funds and Hedge Funds.

== Awards ==
- Duhan was rewarded "Pioneer of Chemical Industry Award" by Turkish Industrialists' and Businessmen's Foundation (TUSIAV) for his contribution to chemical industry in Turkey with Kimetsan company in 2009.
- Duhan was rewarded "Business World Award" by Turkish Economy Magazine "Ekonomize" for his innovation works in chemical industry in 2010.

== Personal life ==
Duhan had been a member of the International Relations Committee of Turkish School Sports Federation from 2010 till 2016.
