= Milka =

European chocolate brand

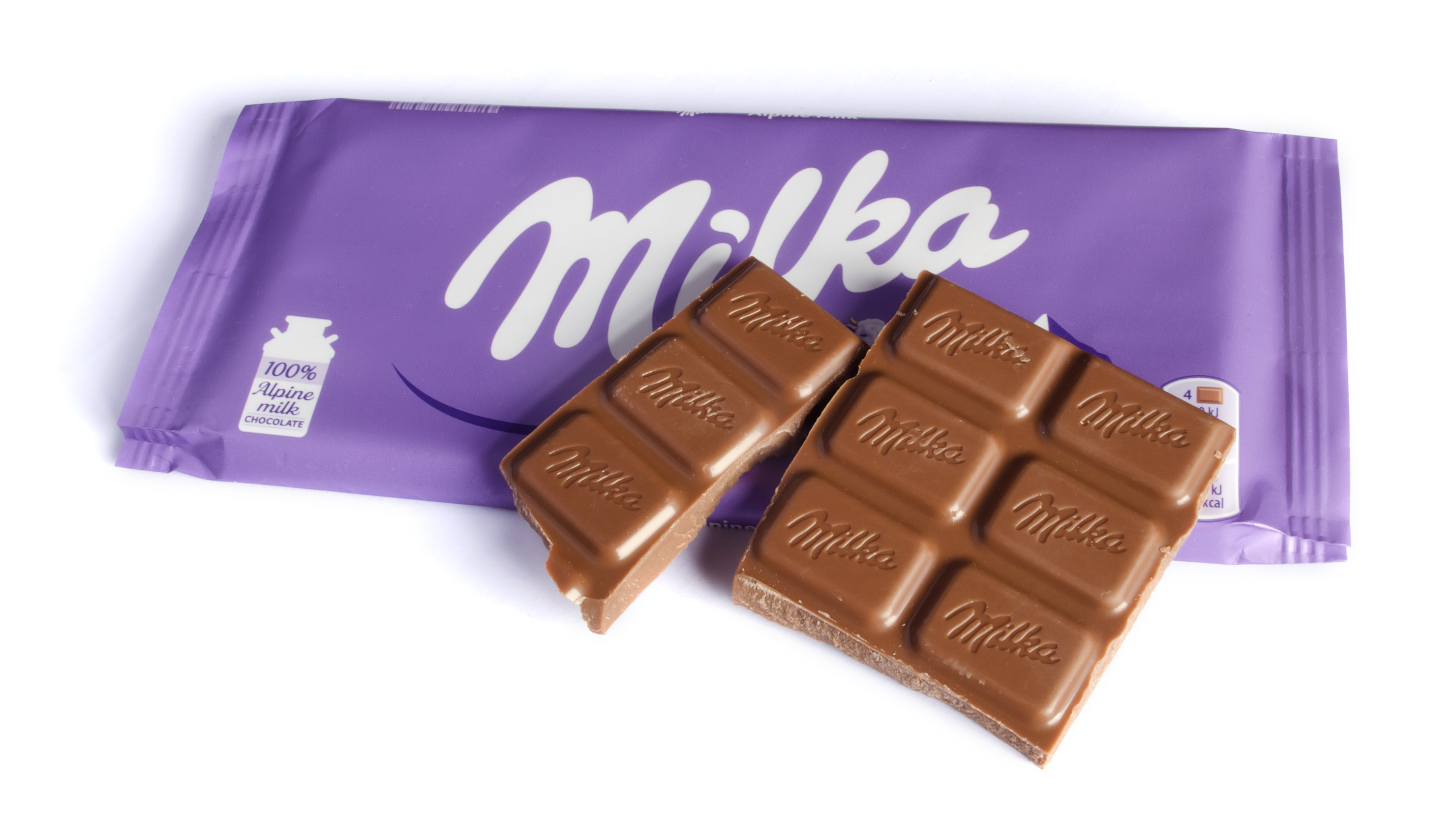
- Product type: Chocolate
- Current owner: Mondelez International (2012–present)
- Country: Country of Origin: Switzerland; Current production: Germany, Slovakia, Argentina
- Introduced: 1901 (125 years ago)
- Related brands: List of Mondelez International brands
- Previous owners: Kraft Foods Inc. (1990–2012); Jacobs Suchard AG (1982–1990); Interfood S.A. (1970–1982); Chocolat Suchard (1826–1970)
- Website: www.milka.com

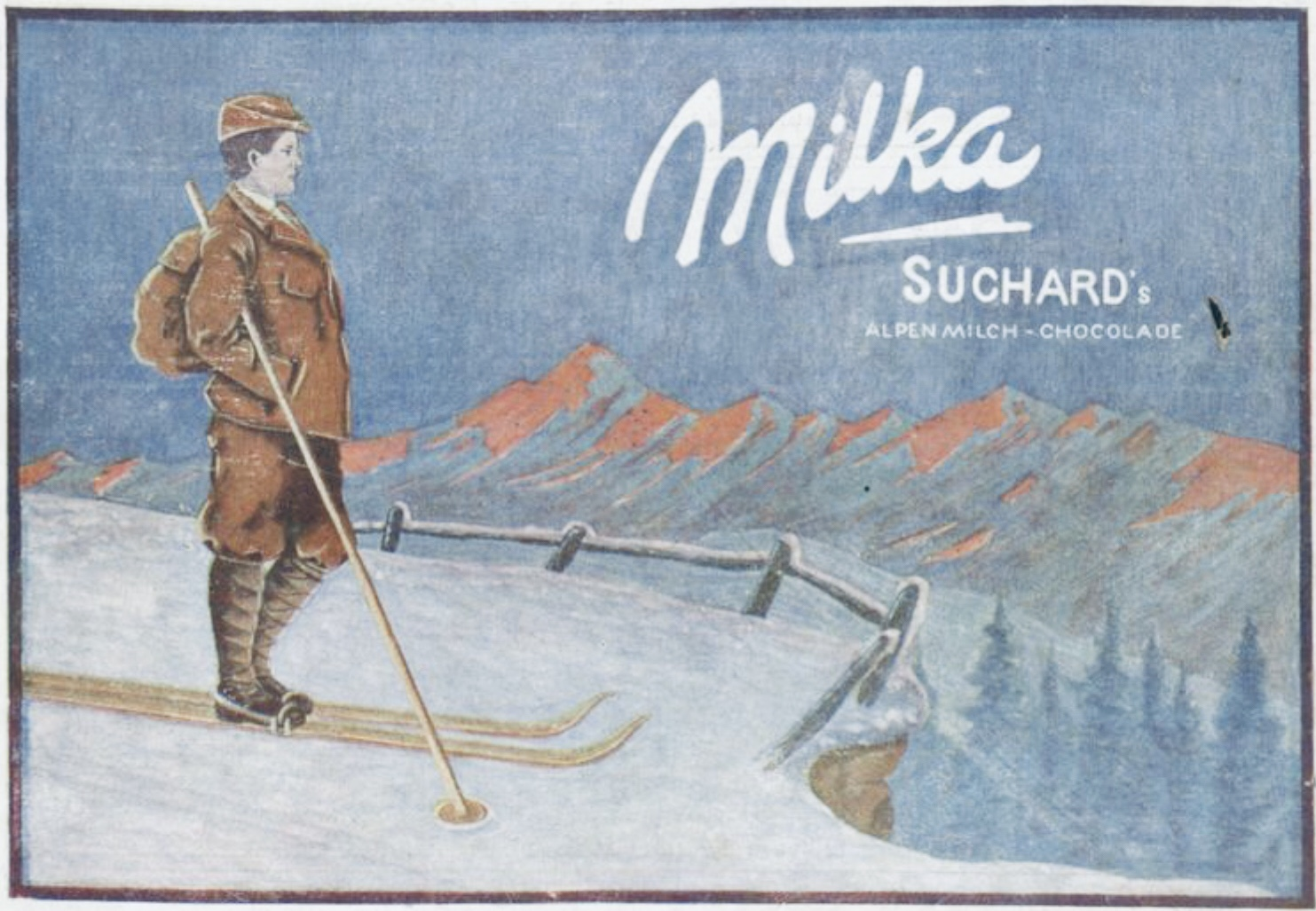
Milka advertisement (1913)

Milka is a European brand of chocolate confectionery. Originally made in Switzerland in 1901 by Suchard, it has been produced in Lörrach, Germany, since 1901. Since 2012 it has been owned by US-based company Mondelez International, when it demerged from its predecessor Kraft Foods Inc., which had taken over the brand in 1990. It is sold in bars and a number of novelty shapes for Easter and Christmas. Products with the Milka brand also include chocolate-covered cookies and biscuits.

The brand's name is a portmanteau of the product's original two main ingredients: "Milch" (milk) and "Kakao" (cocoa). In the present day, sugar and cocoa butter have replaced them as the main ingredients.

== History ==
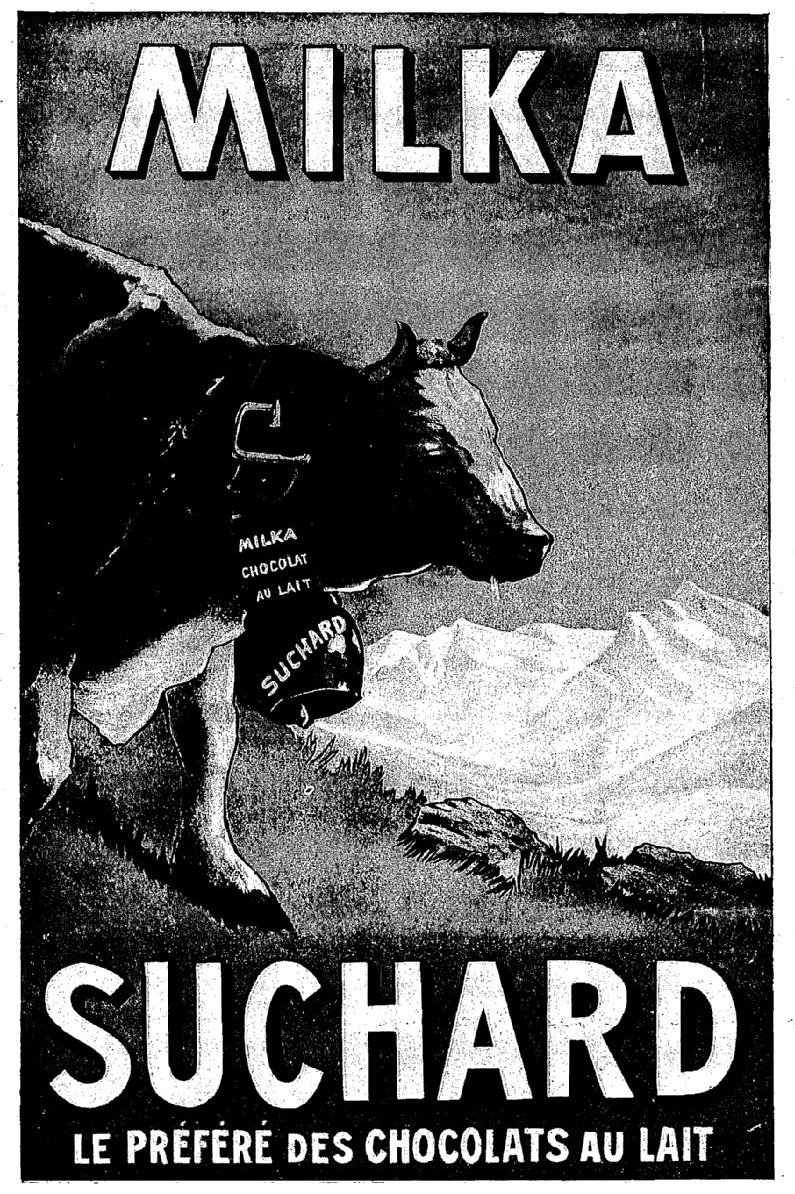
Early advertisement for Milka

On 17 November 1825, Swiss chocolatier Philippe Suchard (1797–1884) established a pâtisserie in Neuchâtel where he sold a hand-made dessert, chocolat fin de sa fabrique. The following year, Suchard founded Chocolat Suchard and moved production to nearby Serrières, where he produced 25–30 kg of chocolate daily in a rented former water mill. During the 1890s, milk was added to Suchard's chocolate, closely following the launch of the Gala Peter brand, founded by Daniel Peter, another Swiss chocolatier.

Carl Russ-Suchard, Philippe Suchard's son-in-law, invented the Milka brand in 1901. The first "Milka" chocolate was packaged in the distinctive lilac-colored packaging. Their products were introduced in Austria in the 1910s in order to spread popularity, and by 1913 the company was producing 18 times more chocolate than they did when at the original plant in 1880. By the 1920s Milka had introduced limited edition themed chocolates. Themes were related around holidays such as Christmas and Easter and had chocolate cast into the shape of Santa Claus, Christmas ornaments, Easter bunnies and various sizes of Easter eggs. By the 1960s the Milka script logo and its lilac packaging was trademarked, quickly becoming Germany’s number one chocolate. Over the next few decades, Milka chocolate enlarged in bigger portions and improved their selection of chocolate products.

In 1970, Suchard merged with Tobler to become Interfood. Interfood merged with the Jacobs coffee company in 1982, becoming Jacobs Suchard. Kraft Foods acquired Jacobs Suchard, including Milka, in 1990. In 1995 Milka officially became a ski sponsor and would later become one of the most famous sport sponsors after the FIS Alpine Cup that was held in Lienz. In October 2012, Kraft spun off its snack food division, which was renamed Mondelēz International. In 2016, they further expanded their market into China. Also in that year, original manufacturer Suchard was among a number of brands sold off by Mondelēz to form Carambar & Co; Mondelēz retained ownership of Milka.

== Advertising ==
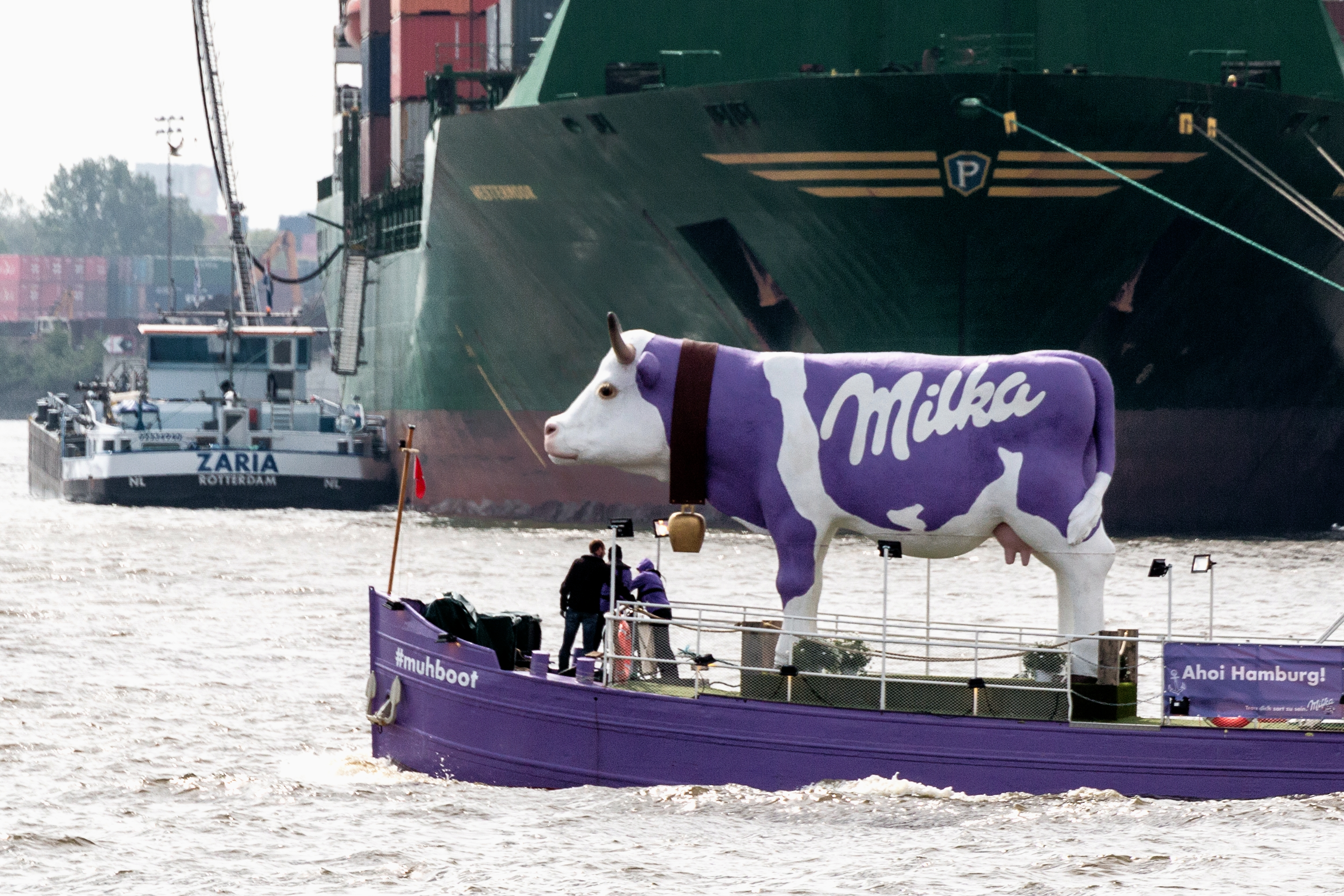
Giant Milka cow in Hamburg

The brand's symbol is a lilac Simmental cow with a bell around her neck, usually in an Alpine meadow, as conceived by Hungarian advertising agent Sándor Szabó living in Germany in 1971. During the 1990s, Peter Steiner appeared in Milka commercials.

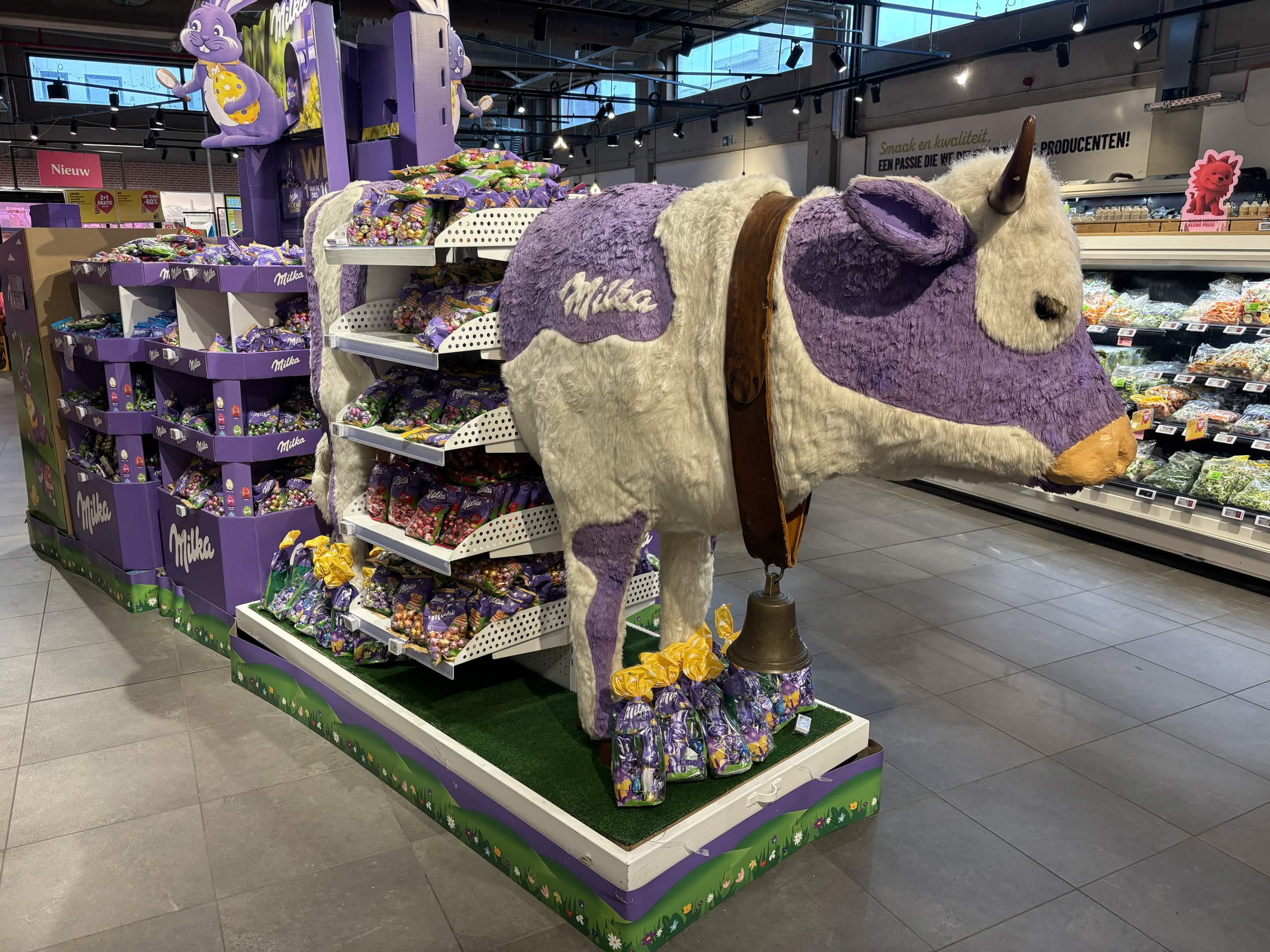
A life-size Milka Cow display in a grocery store

Milka has put focus on "tenderness" being their main advertising theme since the 1960s. In 1972, the Milka cow named Lila ("Lila" being German for lilac, purple, violet) became the face of their advertising campaigns and has remained so to the current day. Milka has sponsored many alpine skiing stars since 1995, including five World and Olympic champions. In 2015, Milka used a lilac-colored boat with Lila the mascot on it to tour the rivers of Germany and Austria during the summer. This boat was dubbed the "Muhboot" (pronounced Moo-boat), a pun on "U-Boot" (German for submarine).

== Products ==
Milka is sold in a number of packages and flavors, according to where it is purchased:

=== Chocolate bars ===
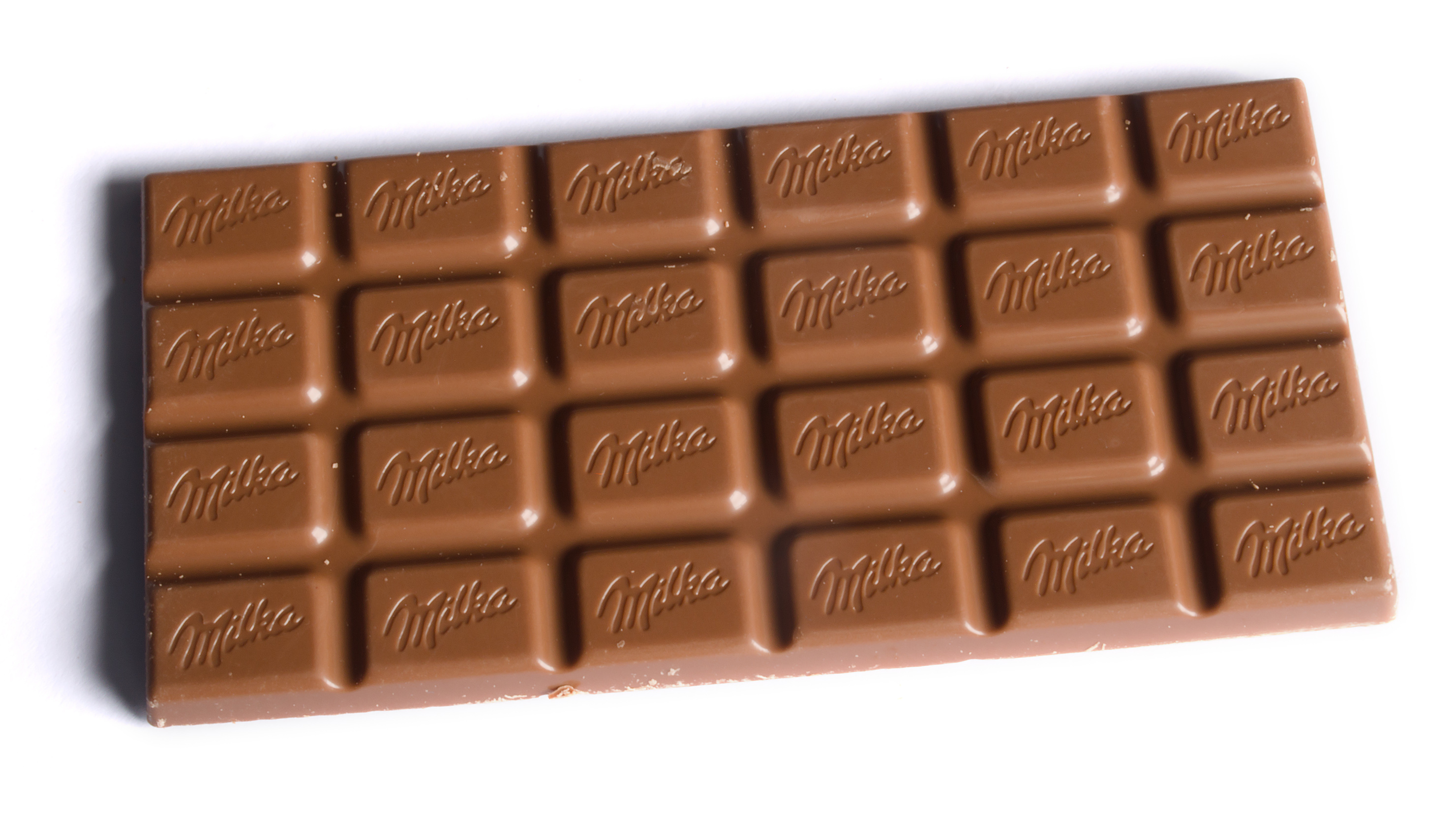
Alpine Milk chocolate bar

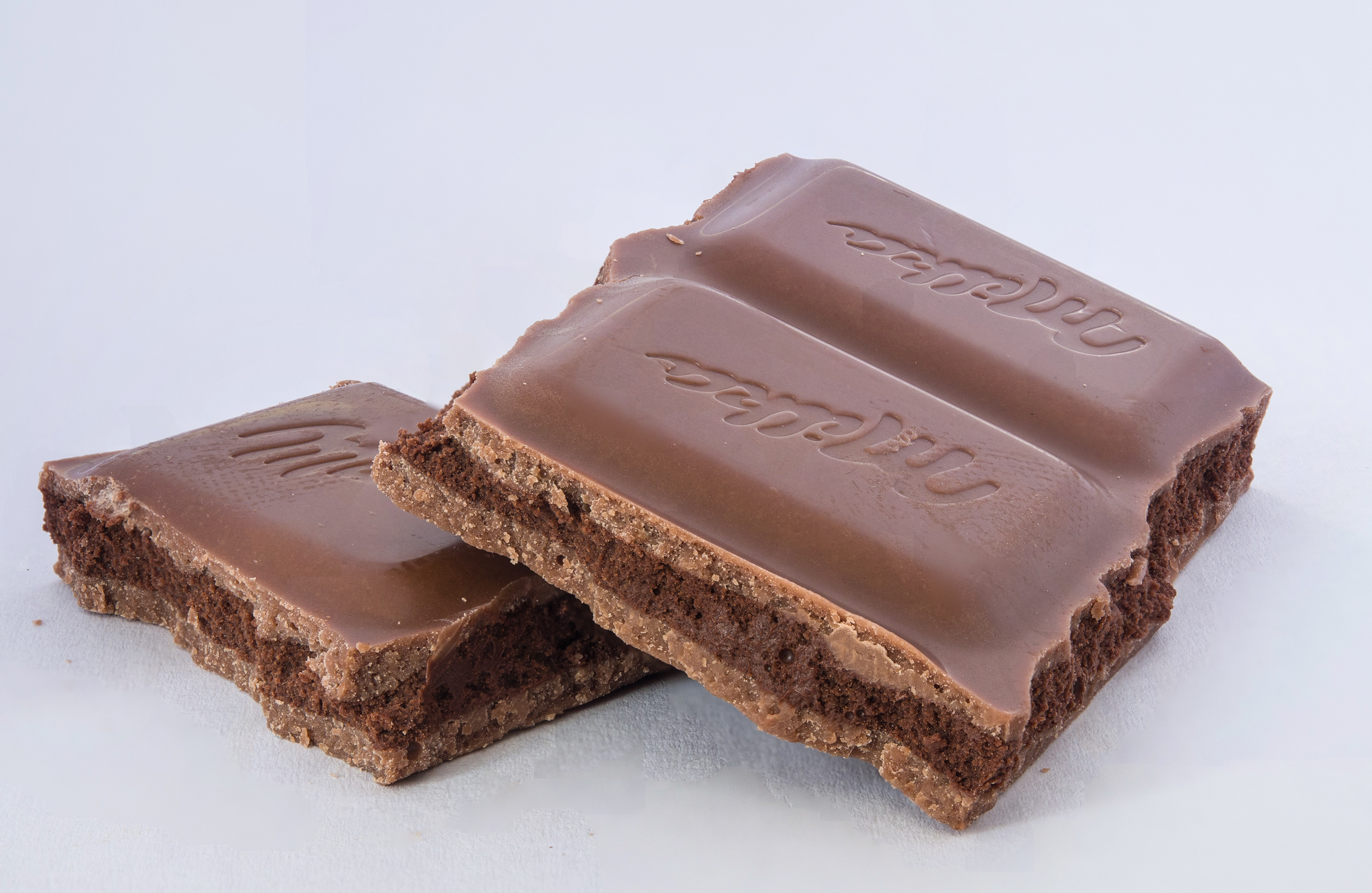
Milka Schoko

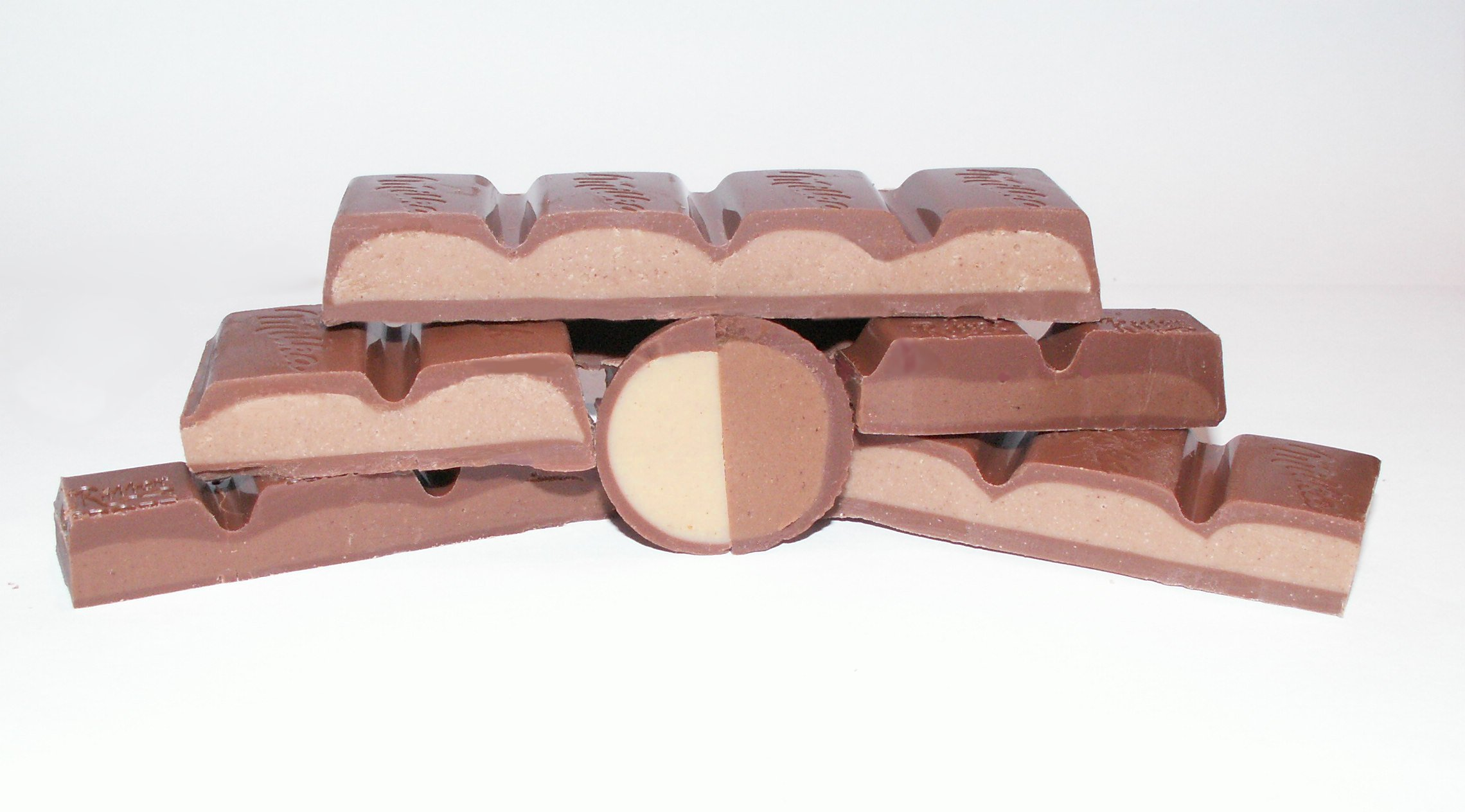
Nougat sweets

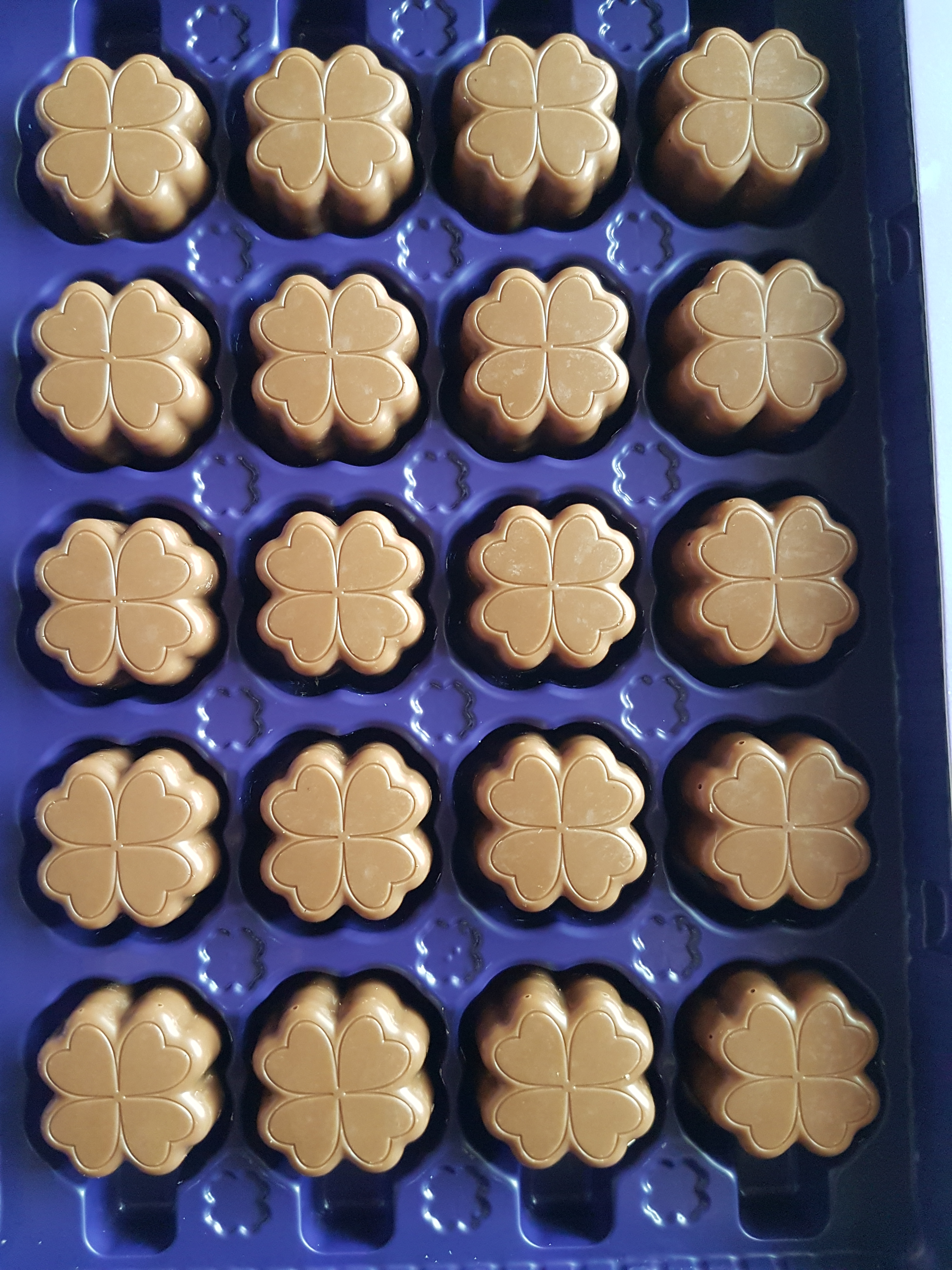
Chocolate confections

- Alpine Milk – Milk-chocolate bar
- Broken Nuts – Milk-chocolate bar with hazelnut pieces
- Milka and Daim – Milk-chocolate bar with Daim bar pieces
- Milka and Oreo – Milk-chocolate bar with Oreo filling
- Choco-Swing – Milk-chocolate bar with a biscuit filling
- Choco and Biscuit – Milk-chocolate with cocoa creme filling and a layer of biscuit
- Strawberry Yogurt – Milk-chocolate bar with strawberry filling
- Caramel – Milk-chocolate bar with caramel filling
- Almond Caramel – Milk-chocolate bar with pieces of almonds and caramel filling
- Whole Hazelnuts – Milk-chocolate bar with whole hazelnuts
- White Chocolate – White chocolate bar
- White Coconut – White-chocolate bar with coconut
- Raisins and Hazelnuts – Milk-chocolate bar with raisins and pieces of hazelnut
- Raspberry Cream – Milk-chocolate bar with raspberry fillings
- Cow Spots or Happy Cow – Milk-chocolate bar with white-chocolate spots

=== Toffees ===
- Milka Toffee – Milk-chocolate-covered toffee filled with caramel
- Milka Toffee Hazelnut

=== Other products ===
- Philadelphia Milka Cheese
- Hazelnut cocoa spread

=== European varieties ===
- Alpine Milk
- Grapes and Nuts
- Strawberry
- Milka and LU Cookies
- Peanut Crisp
- White Chocolate and Oreo
- Milka and Oreo-Sandwich
- Triple Choco Cocoa
- Colourful Chocolate Lentils
- Milka and TUC-Cracker
- Milka and Daim
- Noisette
- Whole Hazelnuts
- Cow Spots
- Yogurt
- White Chocolate
- Caramel
- Dark Chocolate
- Luflée
- Alpine Milk Creme
  - Large Bar
- Whole Hazelnuts
- Strawberry Cheesecake
- Almond Caramel
- Peanut Caramel
- Milka and Oreo
- Chocolate Cookie
- Toffee Whole Hazelnut
- Alpine Milk
- Triple Choc
- Luflée Caramel
- Nut Nougat Creme
- Crispy Yogurt
  - Dark Edition
- Broken Hazelnut
- Cocoa Splinter
- Dark Alpine Milk
- Salted Caramel
- Almond
- Raspberry
