= Peter Steiner (singer) =

Peter Steiner (January 22, 1917, Luzein – November 12, 2007) was a Swiss man who became famous during the 1990s as a music-making advertising character called "Cool Man".

His first songs "It's cool man" and "Geierwally" have sold more than a million copies. Steiner was awarded with a "Golden CD" in Switzerland as well as in Germany.

== Life ==
Steiner was a father and grandfather. His wife Katharina was his manager. His hobby was visiting cattle shows.

Steiner appeared in commercials for "Milka" (a milk chocolate producer), where he played a man who is an old mountain dweller, but who is "cool" anyway. Under the cover "XXL feat. Peter 'Cool Man' Steiner", the song "It's Cool Man" was released. The song, which could be classified "dance" or "disco", began with Steiner saying "Ah - ein Stadtmensch .... / Sie glauben wohl auch, dass wir hier oben etwas altmodisch sind .... / Aber Vorsicht: It's cool man!" ("Aha – an urbanite... You probably think we're a little old-fashioned up here, but beware... It's cool man!")

When he celebrated his 90th birthday in 2007, he received congratulations from United Nations Special Adviser Adolf Ogi and the former boxer Stefan Angehrn.

In the past, Steiner lived in San Bernardino-Villaggio. On the evening of November 12, 2007, he died in Walenstadt after a fall.

== Compilations ==
- "Ah - ein Stadtmensch"
