= Chemoxy International Ltd =

British chemical product manufacturer

- Industry: Chemical
- Founded: 1868
- Headquarters: Teesside, United Kingdom
- Key people: Ian Stark, Martyn Bainbridge, Neil McLouglhin
- Products: Specialty chemicals
- Revenue: £45 million (2013)
- Number of employees: >130 (2013)
- Website: Chemoxy.com/

Chemoxy International Ltd is a British manufacturer of chemical products. Chemoxy operates two manufacturing sites in Teesside, England. The company was previously owned by The Dow Chemical Company and was acquired via a management buyout in December 2011.

Chemoxy International Ltd produces a range of low toxicity solvents which are used in coatings and cleaning products including Coasol and Estasol which are sold globally. Chemoxy also provides solvent recovery services as well as toll manufacturing services based on a range of reaction chemistries combined with a high degree of fractionation.

== History ==
Chemoxy International Ltd's Middlesbrough site has been carrying out distillation services since 1868 and the Billingham site was added to the portfolio in 1994. Chemoxy International Ltd began in 1868 in which it specialised in tar processing and the site was owned by Sadlers, since then it has undergone a couple of name changes as well as being acquired by a couple of different companies before being purchased by Dow Chemical Company in 2001.

On 31 December 2011, the management team led the buyout, supported by the Royal Bank of Scotland to acquire two firms from Dow Chemical that formerly operated as Dow Haltermann Custom Processing in North-East England on undisclosed terms.

One of the Tees Valley’s fastest-growing chemical companies, Chemoxy International Ltd is set to double the size of its Billingham plant. The move is part of a £6 million expansion project being carried out by Chemoxy with support from the Regional Growth Fund. Chemoxy has purchased an additional five acres of land which will house a range of equipment including a combined reaction and fractionation column and provide space for future planned expansions.

Commissioning at the newly acquired site is expected to begin in July 2014. The expansion has resulted in the creation of 15 jobs, including process operators, support staff and those focused on business development – bringing the number of people employed by Chemoxy to 130. The expansion comes just two years after the company was created following a management buyout of Dow Chemical Company's two Teesside custom processing plants and follows a major expansion in 2012.

Chemoxy is one of Europe's contract manufacturers providing manufacturing services to companies engaged in speciality chemicals, petrochemicals, oil and gas, agrochemicals, flavours and fragrances and household and personal care sectors. It has also developed its own portfolio of low-toxicity solvents, including the Coasol range, which are used in environmentally friendly paints, industrial coatings and cleaning products, and exports account for 60% of sales. The business is divided into three key areas. The Middlesbrough site has been carrying out distillation since 1868 and the Billingham plant was added to the portfolio in 1994. The Regional Growth Fund is a £3.2 billion fund designed to help companies in England to grow. So far £2.6 billion of funding has been allocated to support projects and programmes committed to deliver sustainable jobs and economic growth.

== Products and services ==
The company produces its own range of low toxicity solvents which are sold to paint companies all over the world. Chemoxy is also one of the UK's solvent recyclers. These solvents have found application in paint, industrial cleaners and oil-field applications amongst others in blends or used independently.

The products the company produces include:

- Coasol
- Coasol 290 Plus
- Estasol
- 2EHA (2-Ethylhexyl acetate)
- DACH-99 (1,2-Diaminocyclohexane)
- DMA (Dimethyl adipate)
- DnBE (Di-n-butyl ether)
- DIPA (Diisopropyl adipate)
- EGDA (Ethylene glycol diacetate)
- Isoamyl alcohol
- Isoamyl acetate

Chemoxy's core activity is custom processing, for which the company offers a range of equipment which includes:

- 9 glass lined and stainless steel reactors from 9 m^{3} to 25 m^{3} with reaction temperatures to 230 °C
- 9 distillation units with up to 50 theoretical stages and vacuum capability to 5 mm Hg
- Wide range of feed and side stream options.
- Solid raw material addition.
- Bulk methyl chloride and other difficult to handle raw materials.
