= Chocolat Suchard =

Swiss chocolate factory (1826–1996)

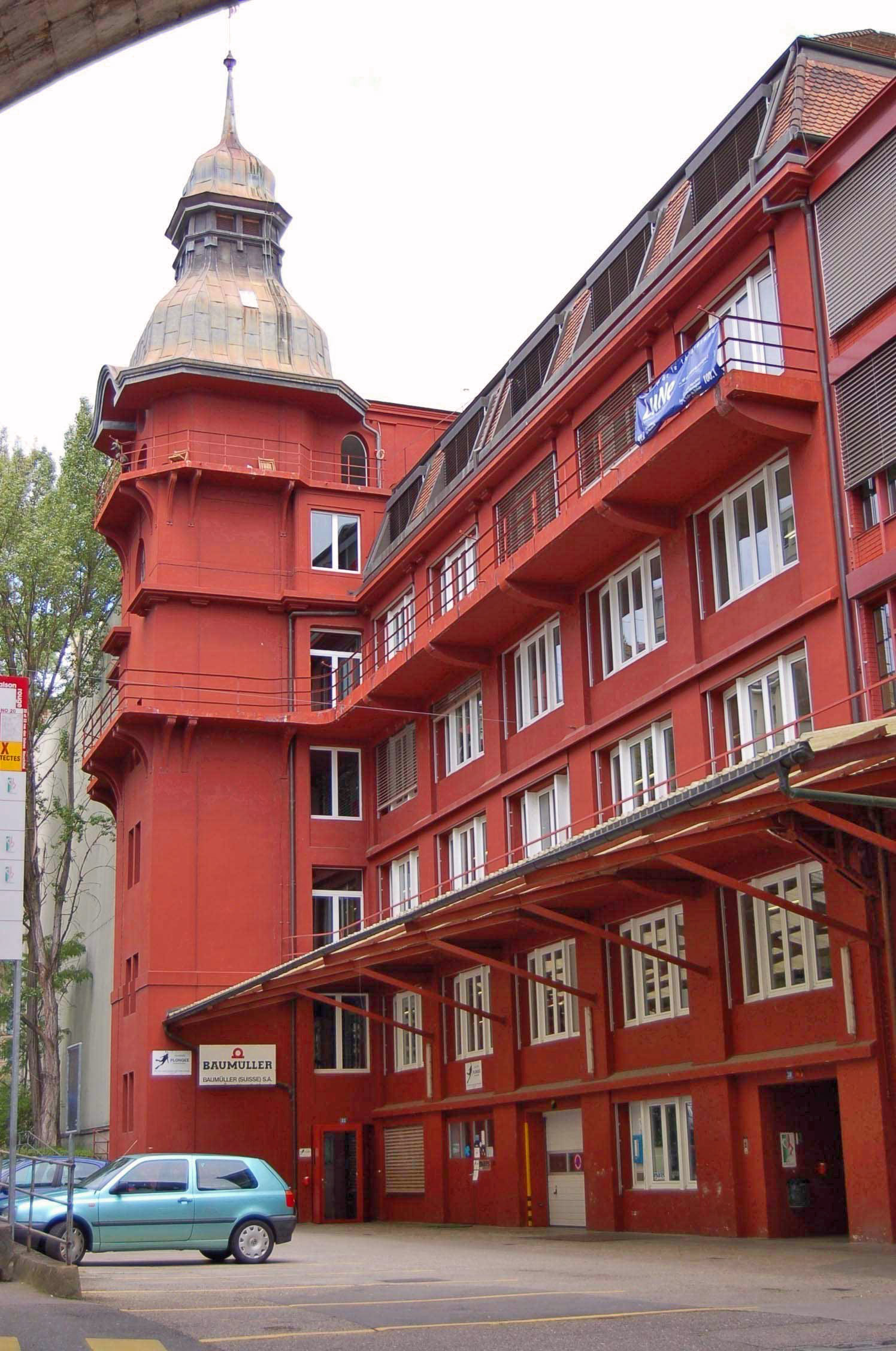
The old "Red Factory" of Serrières

Chocolat Suchard was a chocolate factory founded in Serrières (a neighborhood of Neuchâtel) by Philippe Suchard in 1826. It was one of the oldest chocolate factories in Switzerland until its closure in 1996.

== History ==
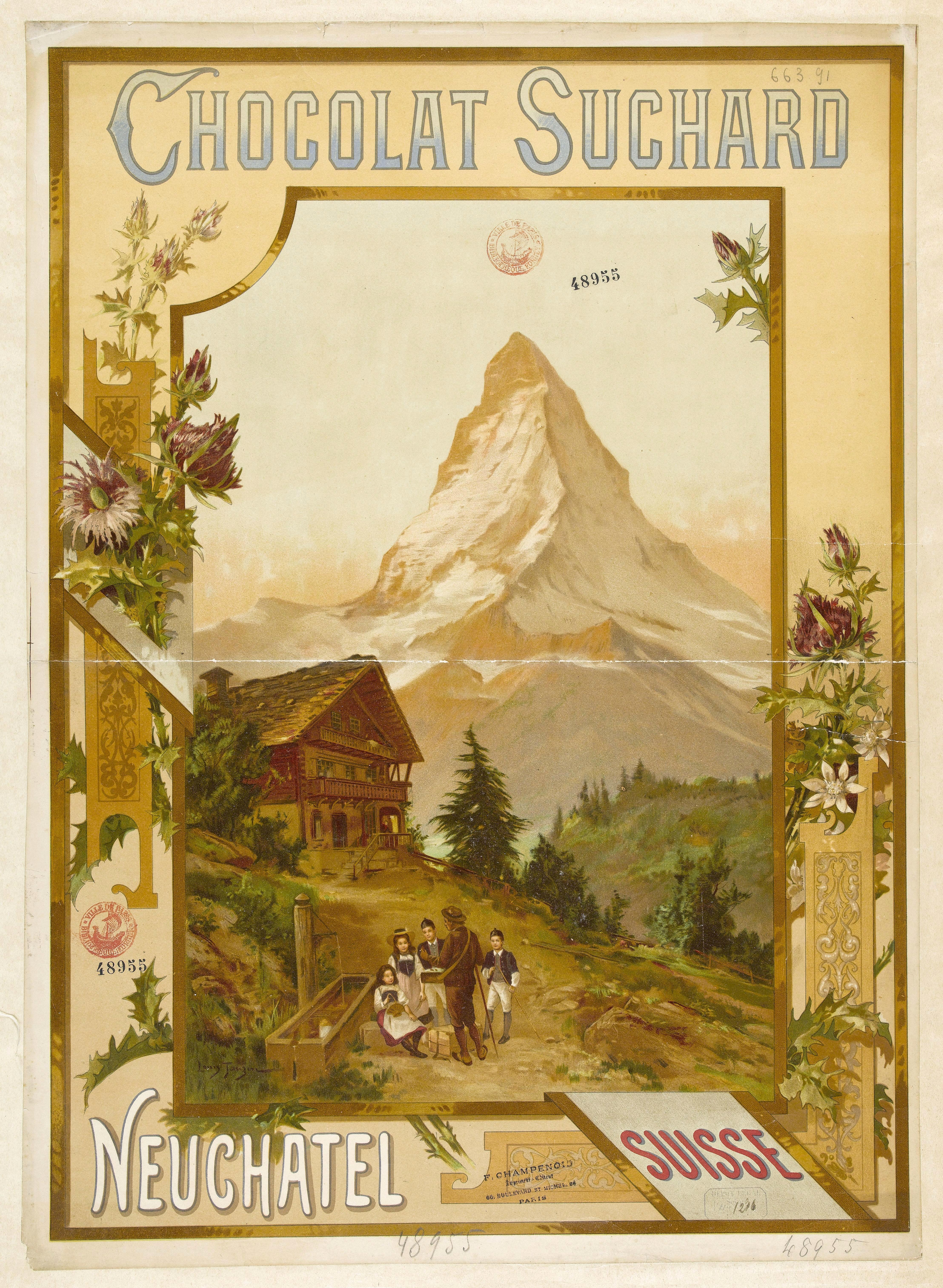
Early 20th century ad

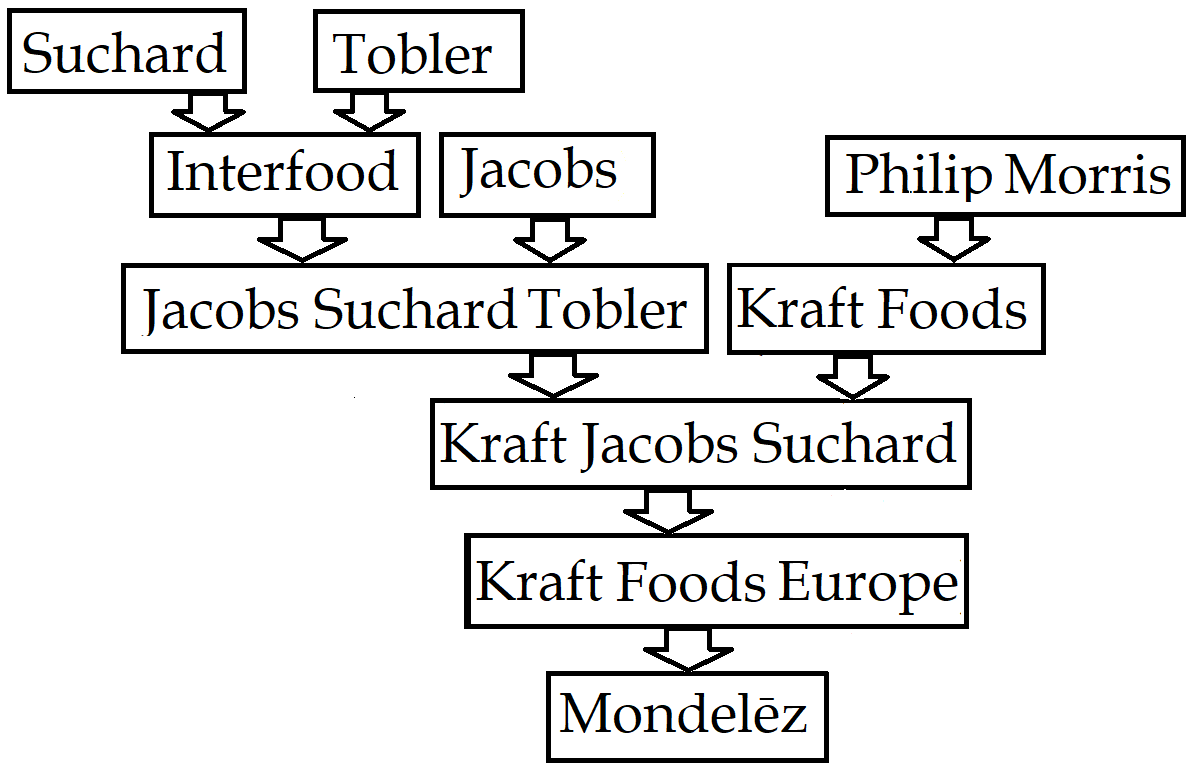
History of the brands

The Suchard chocolate factory took off thanks to his son Philippe (1834–1883), then to his son-in-law Carl Russ (1838–1925), who ran the chocolate company from 1884 to 1924. After Philippe's death in 1884 in Neuchâtel, his daughter, Eugénie Suchard and her husband Carl Russ-Suchard, took over the functioning of his factory. Carl Russ-Suchard opened the first Suchard factory abroad in 1880 in Germany, at Lörrach.

The Suchard factory used hydropower of the nearby river to run the mills. A grinding mill consisting of a heated granite plate, and several granite rollers moving forwards and backwards were used to produce chocolate. This design, the melanger, is still used to grind cocoa paste. As a result, chocolate became more affordable. Before opening his factory, Suchard realized that a small tablet sold at a pharmacy was worth three days' wages.

However, chocolate was still an expensive product, therefore limiting the number of potential customers. Suchard struggled financially early in his career as a chocolatier. His success came in 1842, with a bulk order from Frederick William IV, king of Prussia, who was also the prince of Neuchâtel. This triggered a boom, and soon his chocolates won prizes at the London Great Exhibition of 1851 and the Paris Universal Exposition of 1855. By the end of the 19th century, Suchard had become the largest chocolate producer.

A traveller’s book from 1874 features an advertisement for Suchard's chocolate bonbons and creams, as well as its fancy boxes and tourist boxes of chocolates.

In 1896, inspired by the success of Daniel Peter, Carl Russ-Suchard created a first milk chocolate bar. In 1901, the company mechanized its production and launched the Milka chocolate brand for the Swiss market. Carl Russ-Suchard combined an unusual purple packaging with a Simmental cow symbolizing their use of milk.

Having become a public limited company in 1905, Suchard was transformed into a holding company in 1930, marking the end of the family business after Willy Russ had sold his shares. Suchard continued its development abroad as well as on the Serrières site (30 kg of chocolate per day in 1826, 60 tons in 1924; 100 workers in 1875, 920 at the end of the 1960s) and diversified its products with various brands such as Suchard Express (a chocolate drink) and Sugus (fruit candies).

== Mergers ==
In 1970, Suchard merged with Tobler to become Interfood. In 1982, Interfood was acquired by Klaus Johann Jacobs, and became part of the company Jacobs Suchard. In 1987, the Suchard company acquired 66% of the shares of the Côte d'Or chocolate company. In 1990, Philip Morris, also based in Neuchâtel, announced that they would buy Jacobs Suchard. In 1993, Philip Morris combined Kraft General Foods Europe and Jacobs Suchard AG, renaming it Kraft Jacobs Suchard. Chocolat Suchard was then merged with another Philip Morris purchase, Terry's of York later in 1993 to form the Terry's Suchard subsidiary. It spun off its chocolate and confectionery brands as Mondelez International as of 2012. The Suchard factory in the Serrières Valley is no longer used for production. Mondelez moved production to the Toblerone factory in Bern in the 1990s. In 2015, Mondelez opened a new production line for Milka and Suchard chocolates at its plant in Bludenz, Austria.

The Suchard Rochers brand and Suchard Express was sold by Mondelez, along with Terry's and five factories, to investment company Eurazeo, which formed the French confectioner Carambar & Co in 2016, but this Excludes all of Suchard, including the Chocolat Suchard brands in Argentina, Switzerland, and Spain.

== See also ==
- Swiss chocolate
