= Vichy Pastilles =

Candy

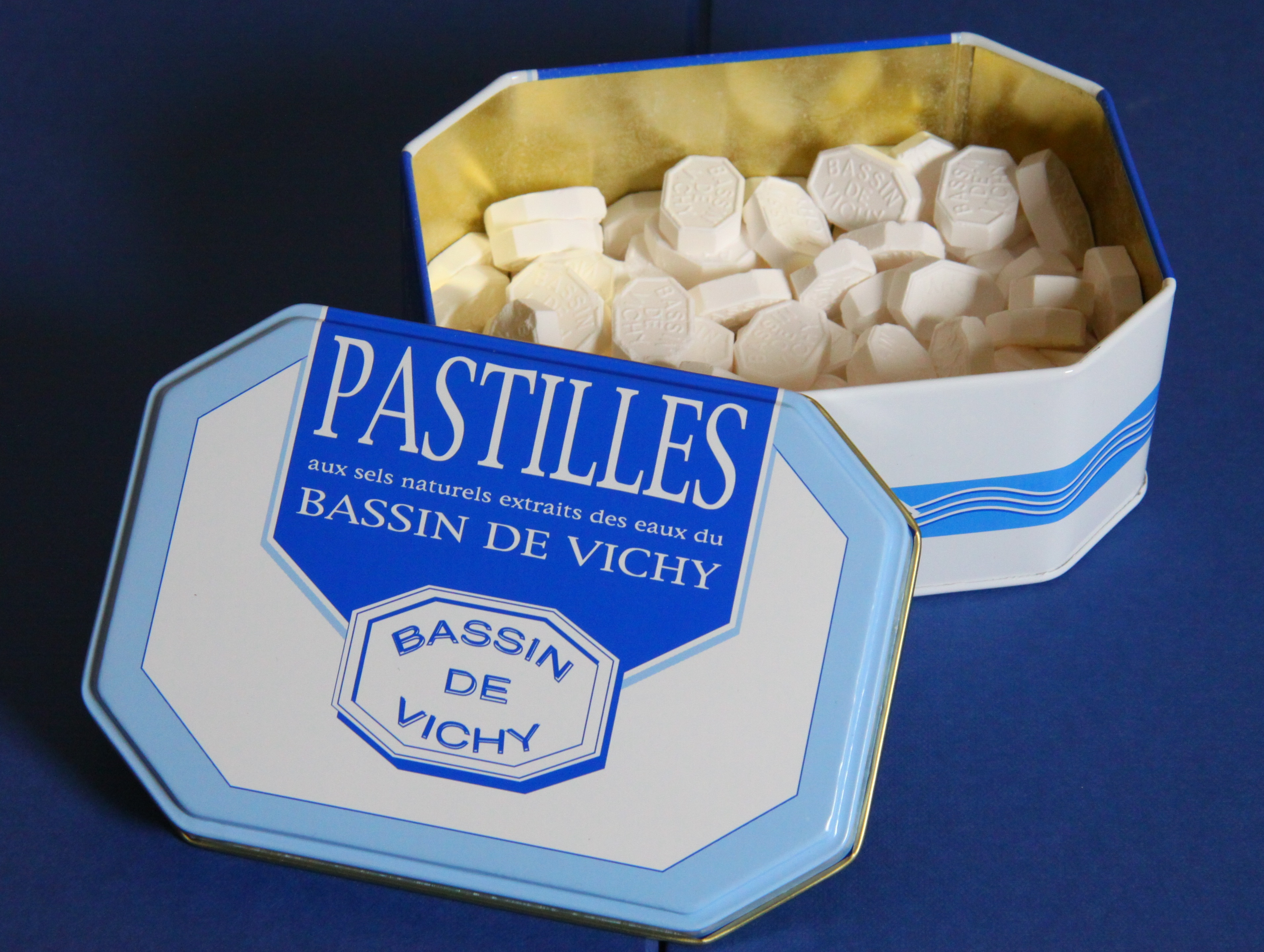
- A box of Vichy Pastilles.
- Type: Confectionery
- Place of origin: France
- Region or state: Vichy

Vichy Pastilles (French: pastilles Vichy), less often pastilles of Vichy (pastilles de Vichy), are a French confectionery invented in 1825 and produced in the spa town of Vichy in central France. They are recognizable as a white, octagonal type of candy pastille bearing the word "Vichy" in all-caps.

== Ownership ==
The Vichy Pastilles brand belonged to the Vichy-État Company in 1940. It was acquired by Cadbury France, a division of Cadbury, in 2003. It later belonged to Kraft Foods (later known as Mondelez International). In 2016, it was purchased by French company Eurazeo for 250 million euros.

== History ==
The pastilles were invented in 1825 in Vichy, a spa town in the department of Allier, France. As early as 1839, they were originally made purely from bicarbonate of soda and taken for their digestive properties. Empress Eugénie de Montijo is said to have been a fan. Later, they were made with mineral salts extracted from the local spring water. Today, they include sugar and are flavoured with mint, lemon, or aniseed.

The pastilles were mentioned by French author Guy de Maupassant in his short story, The Magic Couch.

During World War II, the sweets were used as "branding and marketing" by Vichy France. By August 1942, shops in Vichy gave Vichy pastilles to customers, while other victuals were rationed. However, the mayor of Vichy decided to mark sweets as cheese on their ration cards to avoid running out of them.

In Einstein's Beets: An Examination of Food Phobias, American author Alexander Theroux opines that due to its connotation to Vichy France, "many French citizens are still made uneasy" by hearing the phrase. In The Long Aftermath: Cultural Legacies of Europe at War, 1936-2016, Manuel Bragança and Peter Tame agree, as they argue that Vichy France's use of the sweets as propaganda eventually "backfired."

== See also ==
- List of candies
