= Chocolat Poulain =

French chocolate brand

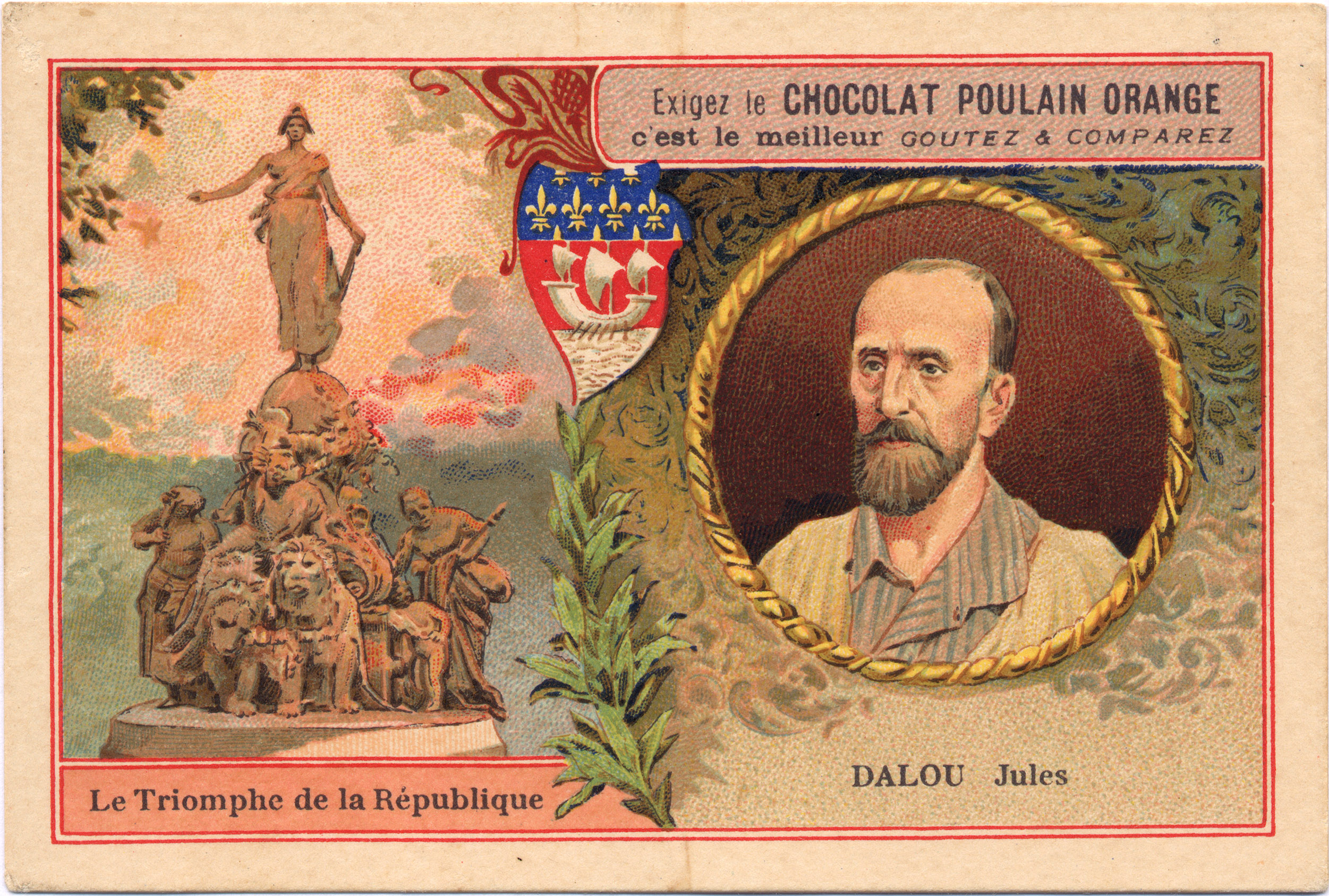
Image Chocolat Poulain

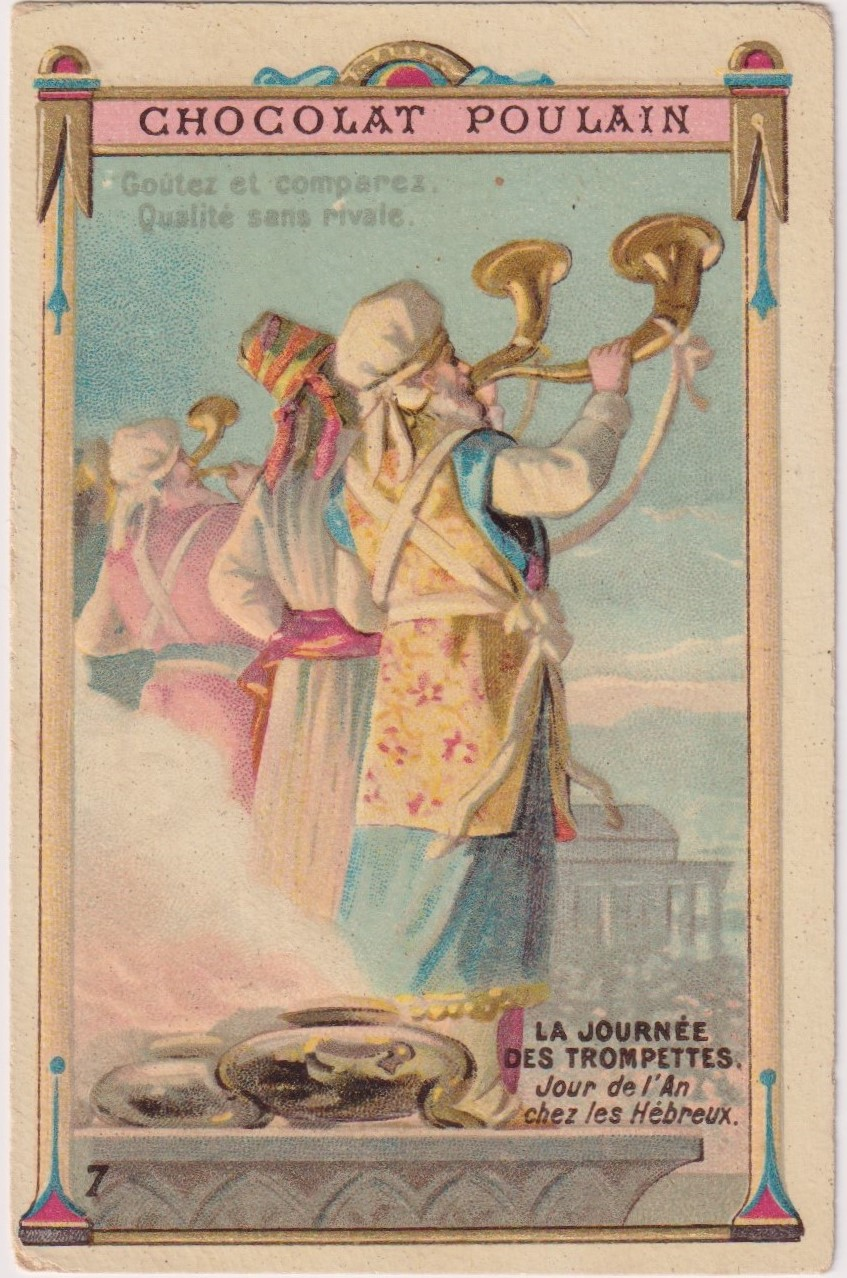
Promotional card for chocolat poulain depicting the Jewish new year, Rosh Hashana, in the Jewish Museum of Switzerland’s collection.

Chocolat Poulain (French pronunciation: [ʃɔkɔla pulɛ̃]) is one of the oldest chocolate brands in France. It is known particularly for its bars of eating- and cooking-chocolate, as well as its Poulain Orange product, which is a chocolate drink mix. The icon of the brand is a jumping foal, which is a wordplay on the creator's name "Poulain", which is French for foal.

Victor-Auguste Poulain began the mass production of chocolate in 1848 in Blois, France, before forming a limited company in 1893. He believed that a commercial future in chocolate would be found by selling to the masses and was innovative in industrialising the production of chocolate and in widespread marketing campaigns targeting children and families. In 1975, Chocolat Poulain was the sponsor of the mountains classification in the Tour de France when its distinctive polka jersey was introduced; the jersey's design was based on the jersey of the pre-War cyclist Henri Lemoine and later, due to its popularity, the design was adopted for wrapping of their chocolate bars.

The company was bought by Cadbury Schweppes in 1988. Cadbury was purchased by Kraft Foods in 2010, which later becoming Mondelēz International. and since 2017 belongs to Eurazeo.
