= Carambar =

French caramel candy brand

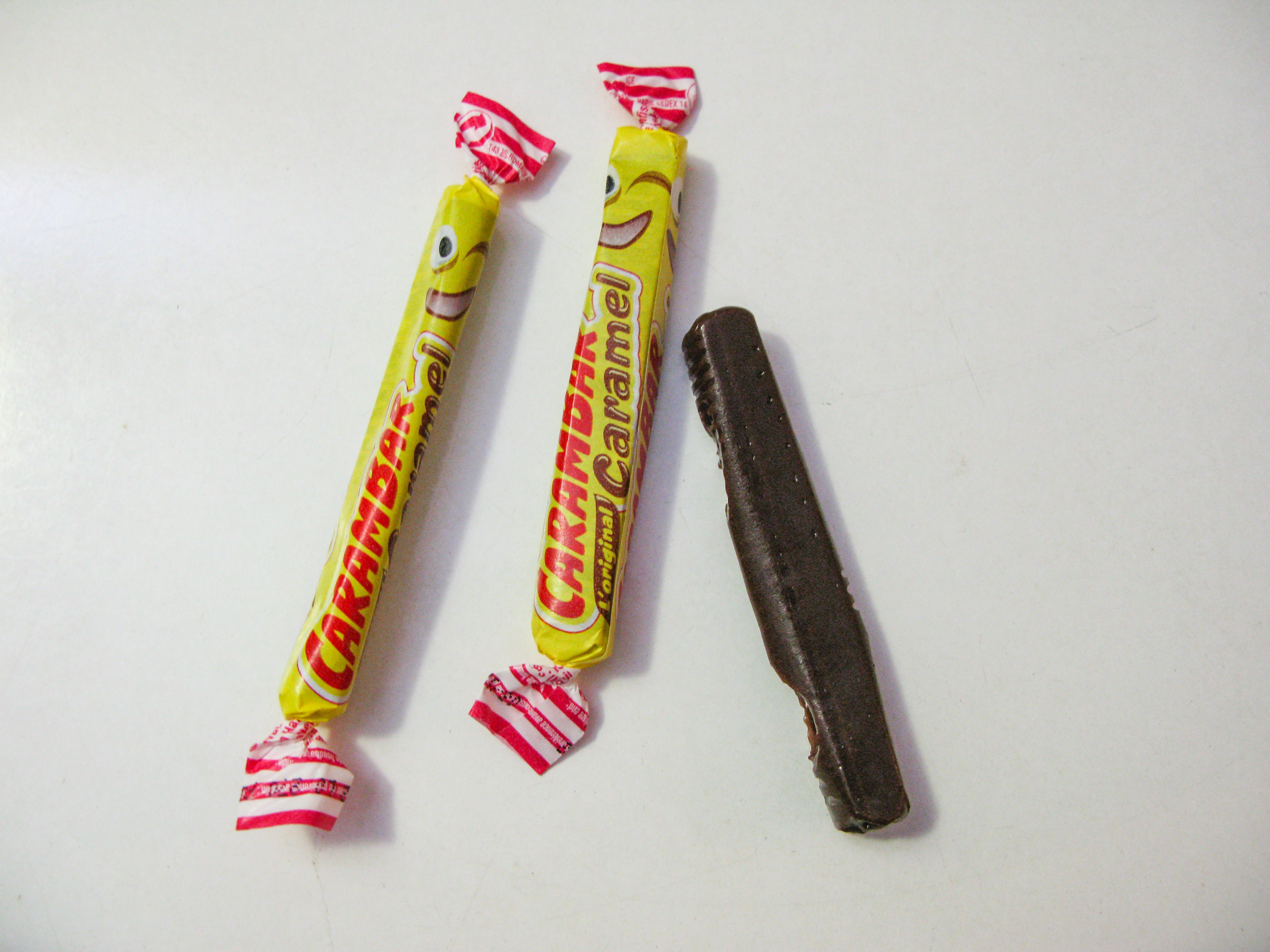
- Type: Caramel candy
- Place of origin: France
- Region or state: Hauts-de-France

Carambar is a brand of chewy caramel candy from France, produced by Carambar & Co.

== History ==
In 1954, Mr. Fauchille, director of the Delespaul-Hazard company, and Mr. Gallois, an employee, had a surplus of cocoa and decided to create a new, original recipe to use it up. The legend says that one of the machines in the factory was malfunctioning, making the long bars that still exists today. This sweet, in the form of a bar was named Caram'bar.

Each of the original Caram'bars were a regulated size and weight. The statistics are as follows:

- Length: 7 cm
- Weight: 10 g
- Recommended retail price: 5 centimes
- Wrapper: Yellow, with red striped twisted ends

Inside of the wrappers, there were "Carambar points" which could be redeemed for various Carambar-related products until 1961, when points were replaced by jokes. Carambar is famous for the poor quality of these jokes, and the expression blague Carambar (French: Carambar joke) refers to a bad or childish joke.

In 1972, the name changed to "Super Caram'bar". In 1977, the name lost its apostrophe.

In 2013, the traditional jokes printed on the candy wrappers were replaced by educational games.

=== Ownership ===
In 1998, Carambar came under the ownership of the British company Cadbury.

On 20 January 2010, the American company Kraft Foods acquired Cadbury for €13 billion. Subsequently, ownership of the brand passed to several companies before Carambar & Co, which was ultimately acquired by Ferrero SpA.

== Flavours ==
Currently, there are many different flavours all available in multipacks:

- Natural Flavours (Arômes Naturels)
  - Lemon / Citron
  - Strawberry / Fraise
  - Orange
  - Raspberry / Framboise
  - Peach/pêche
- Drinks
  - Cola / Coca
  - Grenadine
  - Oasis Peach Tea/Thé à la pêche
  - Orangina yellow / jaune
- Other flavours
  - Cherry / Cerise
  - Candy floss / Cotton Candy / Barbe à papa
  - Caramel
  - Caranougat
  - Orangina red / rouge
  - Lime / Citron vert
  - Bigoouu / Pomme Cassis / Double Flavor
  - Passion fruit / Fruit de la passion

There are now various other flavours available which include the Carambar Atomic, which has sherbet inside. These have strange names like Green Cactus. There are Titeuf ones which have pictures of the Swiss comic strip star Titeuf and his friends. The Titeuf Carambars are blue on the outside and yellow inside or vice versa.
