= Castlegate House =

Grade I listed building in York, England

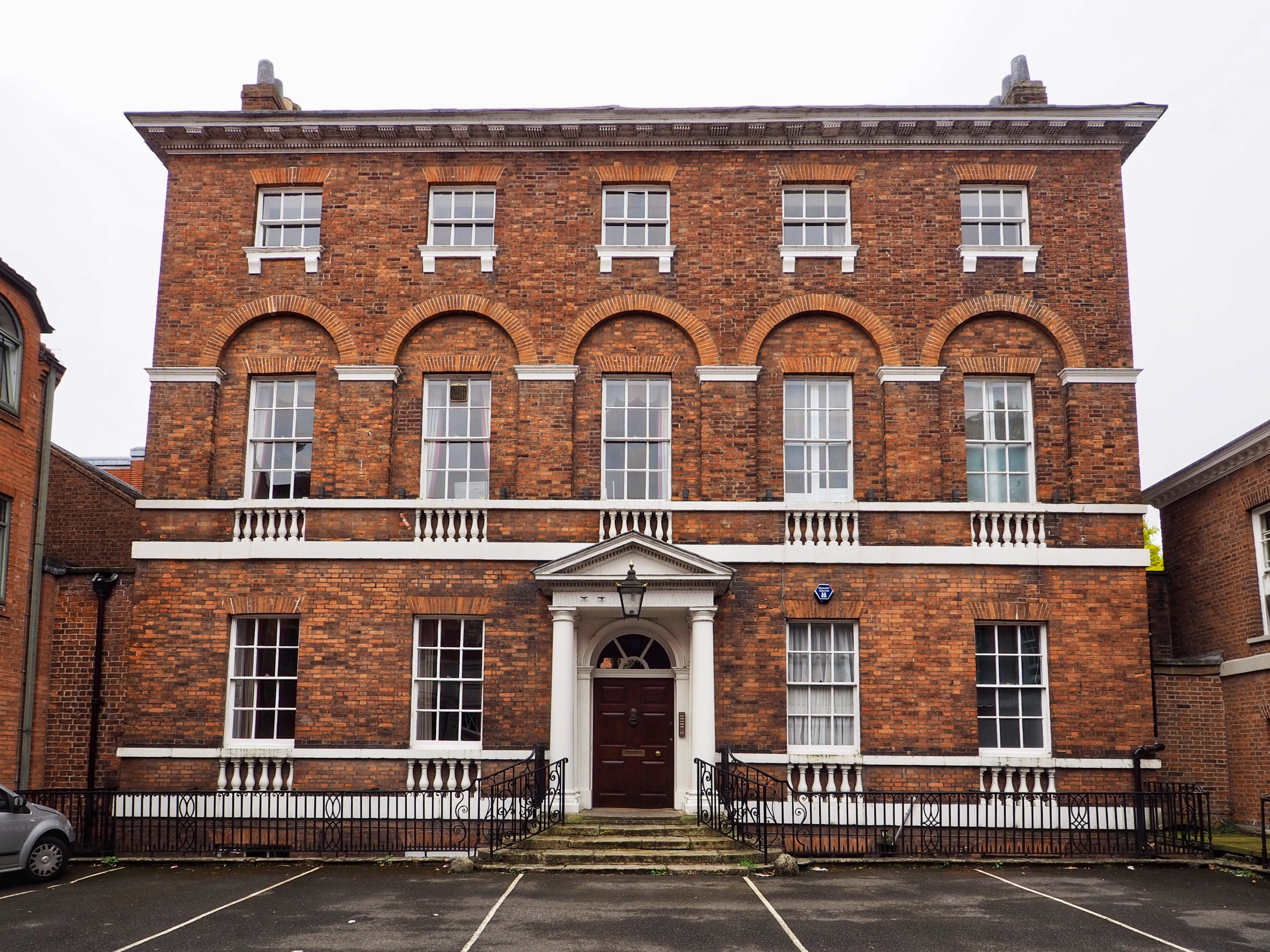
- The building in 2024

- Location within York City Centre

General information
- Status: Masonic temple
- Type: Townhouse (former)
- Location: 26 Castlegate, York, England
- Coordinates: 53°57′24″N 1°04′50″W
- Year built: 1762–63
- Renovated: c. 1920 (extended)
- Client: Peter Johnson

Design and construction
- Architect: John Carr
- Designations

Listed Building – Grade I
- Official name: Castlegate House and attached railings
- Designated: 14 June 1954
- Reference no.: 1259338

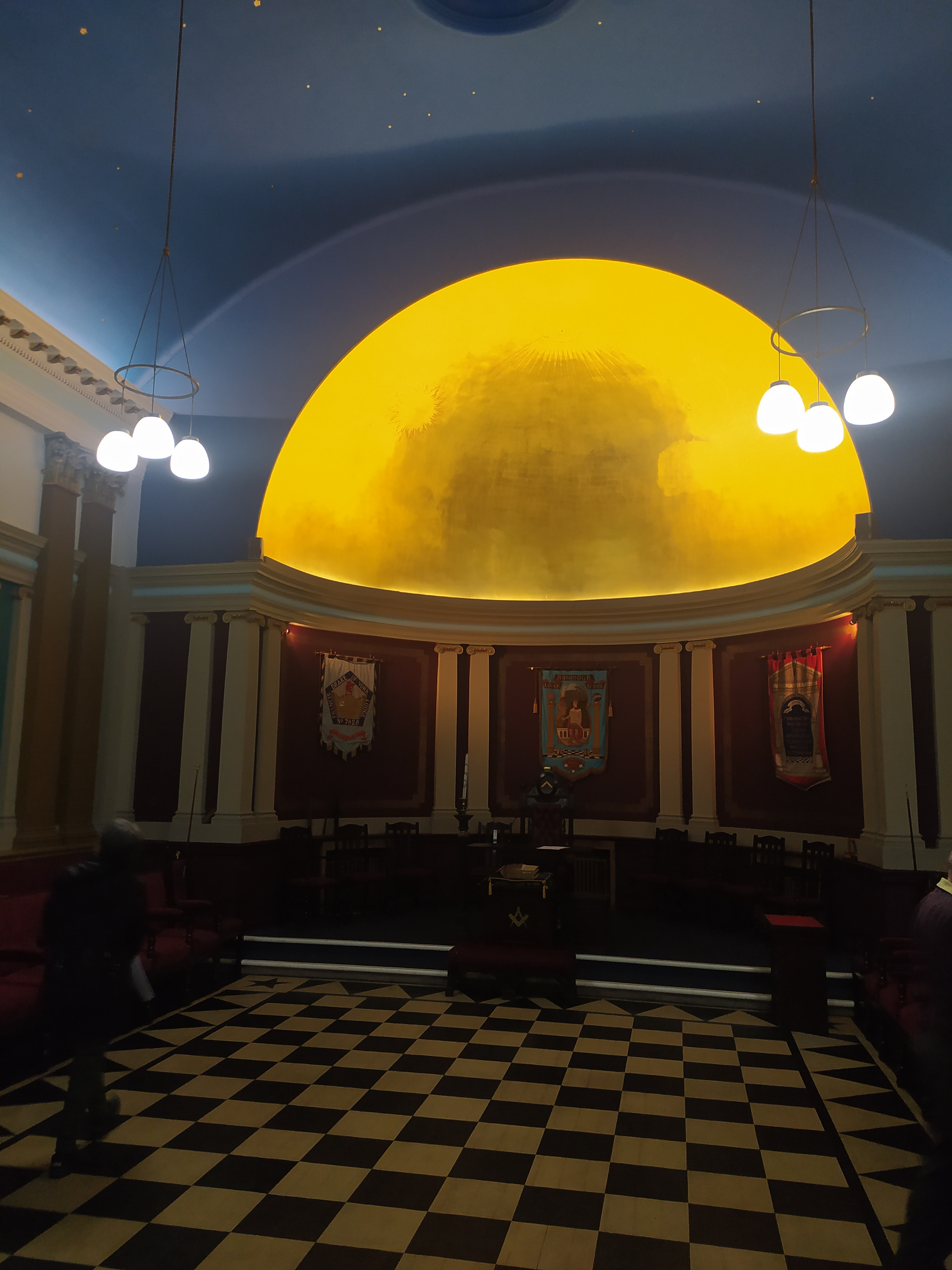
Masonic temple in the house

Castlegate House is a Grade I listed Georgian building on Castlegate in the city of York, England.

== History ==
The house was commissioned by Peter Johnson, who served as Recorder of York from 1759 to 1789. The site on Castlegate was previously occupied by a number of small houses and, prior to that, had formed the principal part of the grounds of a Franciscan priory. The house was designed by John Carr, a prolific local architect working in the Palladian style, who was considered to be the leading architect of the era in the north of England. Although its completion date is not known with certainty, it has often been estimated at 1763, as this date appears on a rainwater head at the rear of the property.

In 1831, the house became the Quaker York Quarterly Meeting Girls' School. Its lease expired in 1857, and it was offered the opportunity to purchase the house. However, its trustees deemed the property unsuitable, and the school instead moved to Dalton Terrace, becoming The Mount School.

More recently, the house has been used as a masonic temple. In about 1920, an extension was added at the side to facilitate this, designed by Ward and Leckenby.

Further along the street lies Fairfax House, another Grade I-listed Georgian house, which is open to the public as a museum and run by York Civic Trust. R. K. Booth described Castlegate as "outwardly perhaps the more interesting of the two".

== Architecture ==
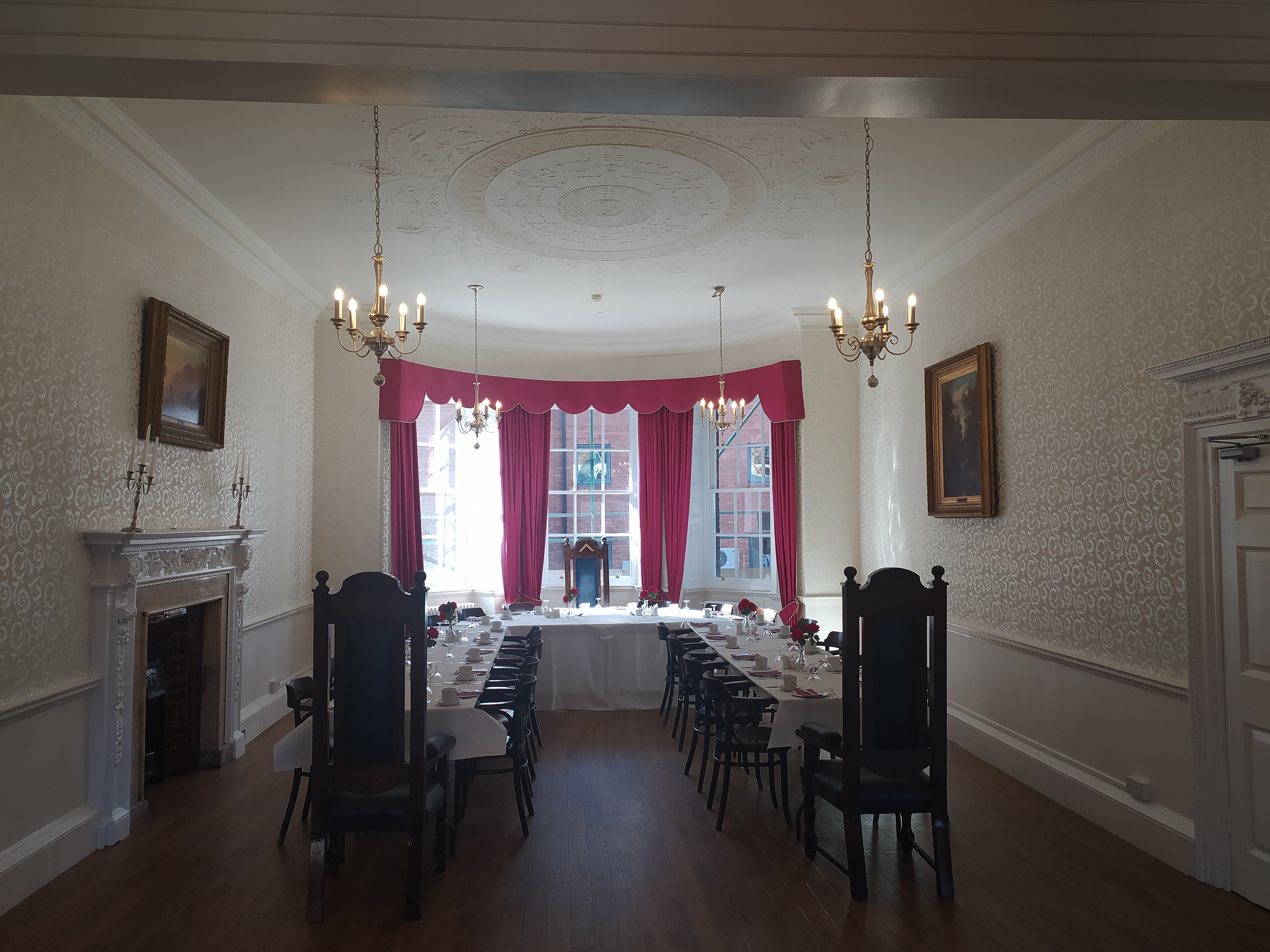
First floor dining room

The house consists of five bays, and it has three storeys above ground, in addition to a basement. It is constructed of orange-brown bricks, and has a hipped roof covered with slate. The main entrance is through a Doric porch, up a short flight of steps. Although altered, much of Carr's original interior design survives, including staircases and plaster decoration.

== See also ==
- Grade I listed buildings in the City of York
- Listed buildings in York (within the city walls, southern part)
