= Davy Tower =

Listed building in York, England

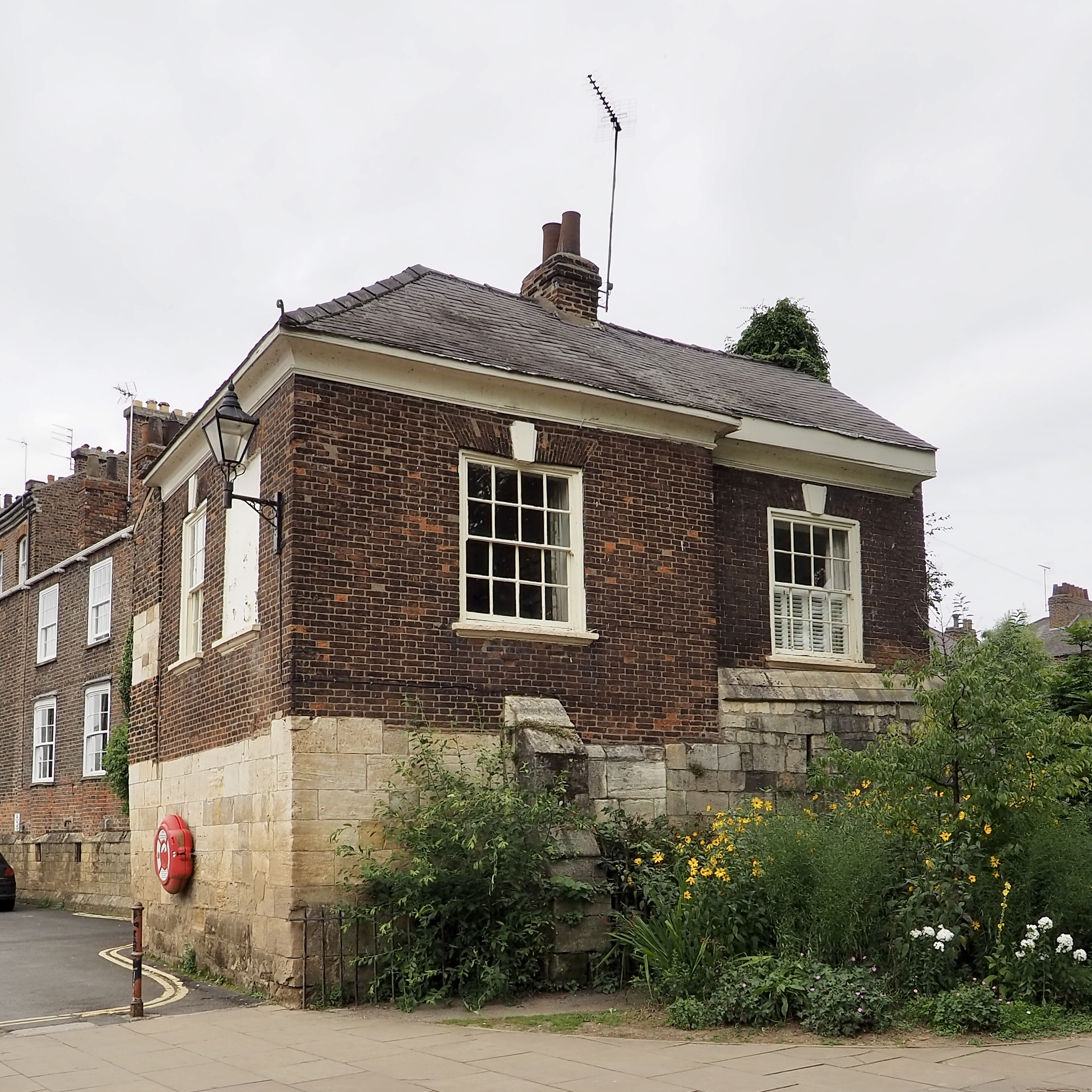
- The former tower in 2021

- Location within York City Centre
- Alternative names: 9 Tower Place

General information
- Status: Converted to residential use
- Type: summerhouse (former); originally tower
- Location: Tower Place, York, England
- Coordinates: 53°57′18″N 1°04′53″W
- Year built: c. 1250
- Renovated: c. 1730 (converted) c. 1830 (extended); 20th century (extended)

Design and construction
- Designations

Listed Building – Grade II*
- Official name: 9, Tower Place
- Designated: 14 June 1954
- Reference no.: 1256415

The Davy Tower (officially listed as 9 Tower Place) is a feature of the York city walls in England.

The stone tower was built around 1250, probably at the end of a wall or earthwork leading to Castlegate, around the moat of York Castle. It was first recorded in 1315, and by 1424 the part of the city inside the walls was occupied by the York Franciscan Friary. Until 1553, a chain could be strung across the River Ouse from the tower to a now-demolished tower near Skeldergate. From 1607, a public toilet adjoined the tower, on the river side, known as the "Sugar House". In 1732, it was replaced by a stone arch, the Friargate Postern.

Around 1730, the tower was altered, when a summerhouse was constructed in its southern corner: the basement in stone, and the raised ground floor in brick. It was extended in about 1830, and has since filled all but the north-west corner of the tower, which has been demolished. The building was extended again in the 20th century, incorporating a coal store and a new concrete floor. In 1954, it was Grade II* listed.

The medieval stone wall is about 10 feet (3 m) high and 1 foot 8 inches (0.51 m) thick, and it retains two original windows: an arrowslit in a cross shape, and a musket loop. Some internal features survive from the 18th century, including a chimneypiece, window seats, a dado rail with panelling, and a cornice.

== See also ==
- Grade II* listed buildings in the City of York
- Listed buildings in York (within the city walls, southern part)
