= Tower Street (York) =

Street in York, England

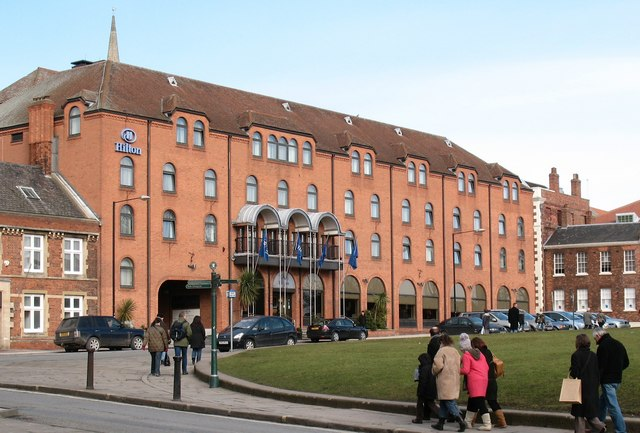
- The Hilton Hotel, on Tower Street
- Location within York
- Former name: Castlegate Postern Lane
- Location: York, England
- Coordinates: 53.9555°N 1.0803°W
- North east end: Castlegate
- Major junctions: Clifford Street
- South east end: Fishergate

Tower Street is a road in the city centre of York, in England.

== History ==
The street originated as a lane leading from York city centre, between the base of the motte of Clifford's Tower and the York Franciscan Friary, to Castle Mills and St George's Field, where there was a Mediaeval chapel. By 1725, it was known as Castlegate Postern Lane, and half its width was paved by the city corporation. The street increased in importance as it provided access to the city's prison, and a ferry across the river to Skeldergate. In 1880, some buildings on the street were demolished so that Clifford Street could be constructed, and in 1881, it was linked to the new Skeldergate Bridge by a new road across St George's Field. The same year, a tramline was constructed along the street, from Castle Mills Bridge to Clifford Street.

== Layout and architecture ==
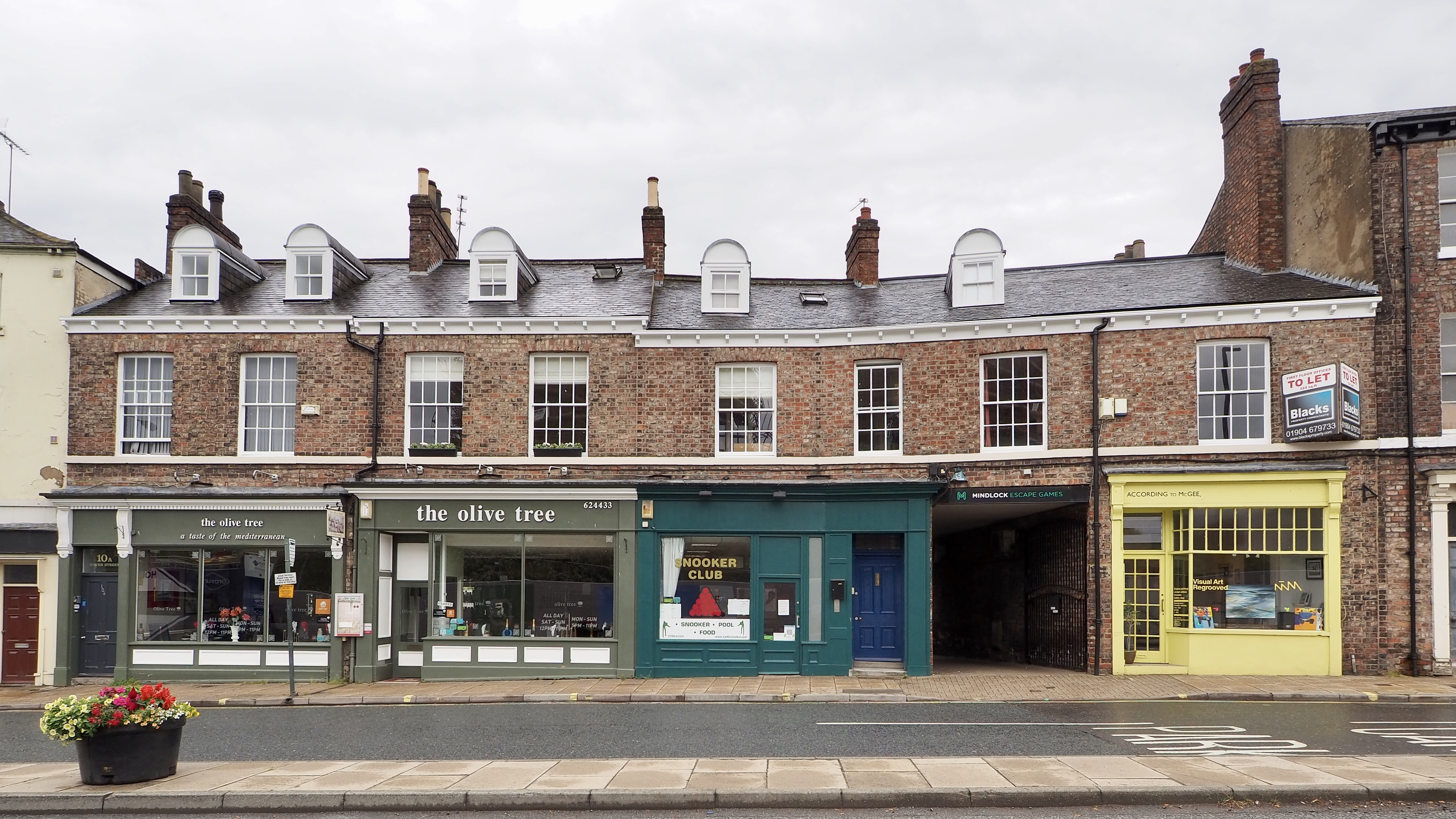
8 to 10B Tower Street

In plan, the road forms a "C" shape. It starts at a junction with Castlegate and Castle Walk, which also provides access to the Castle Car Park. It runs south-west to a junction with Clifford Street and Peckitt Street, at which it swings round to run south-east. The next section is part of the B1227 and is a dual carriageway. Tower Place runs off to the south-west, and access to the Eye of York off the north-east side. Passing Tower Gardens, it reaches the city's inner ring road at a junction with Bishopgate Street. It continues east as part of the ring road, with access to St George's Field Car Park and the River Foss Barrier off its southern side. It ends at Castle Mills Bridge, over the River Foss, beyond which its continuation is Fishergate.

The street wraps around York Castle, with its various associated buildings and walls. Notable buildings on the other side of the road are the Hilton Hotel, built in 1986 as a Holiday Inn; the Tower Street drill hall, built in 1885 and now the York Army Museum; the mid-19th century 6 and 7 Tower Street, and 8 to 10B Tower Street; the early-19th century 11 and 12 Tower Street, and 13 and 14 Tower Street; and a memorial to the Boer War, in the middle of the street. In 2021, the City of York Council began constructing a multi-storey car park to replace the former flat St George's Field Car Park, to permit the closure of the Castle Car Park.
