= Friargate Quaker Meeting House =

Religious building in York, England

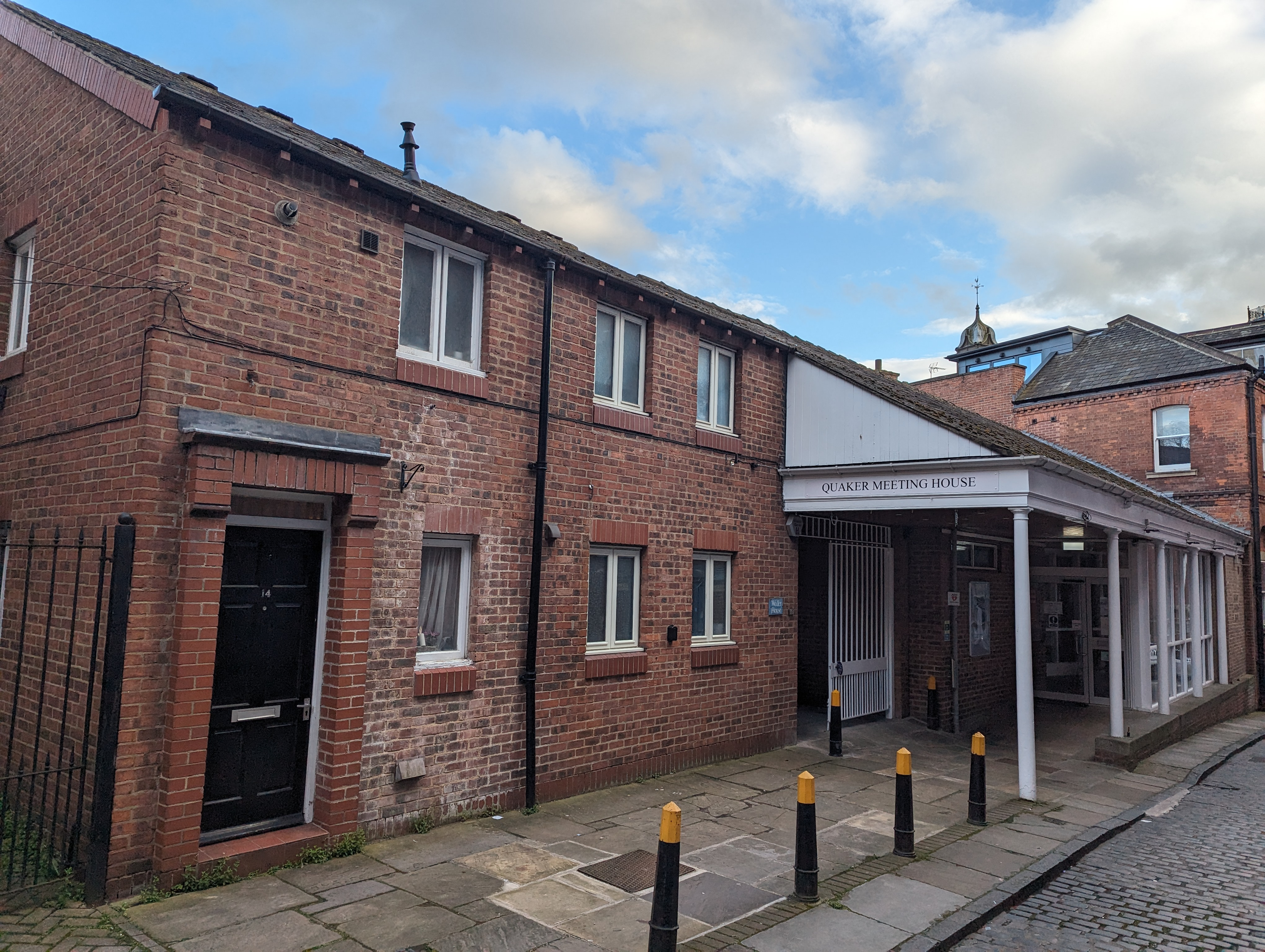
- The meeting house, in 2024
- Friargate Quaker Meeting House
- 53.95693°N 1.08128°W
- OS grid reference: SE 60382 51601
- Location: York, North Yorkshire
- Address: Friargate, York
- Country: England
- Denomination: Religious Society of Friends
- Website: friargate.quakermeeting.org

History
- Status: Active

Architecture
- Architect(s): Jones, Stocks and Partners
- Style: Modern
- Completed: 1981

Specifications
- Materials: Brick

Friargate Quaker Meeting House is a religious building in the city centre of York, in England.

Quakers first met in York in the 1650s, and in 1674 they converted a house on what is now Friargate for use as a meeting house. In 1718, a larger site to its east was purchased, and a larger meeting house was constructed, with a capacity of 800 to 1000 worshippers, while the original meeting house was extended and converted into a meeting room for women. In 1817, Charles Watson and James Pigott Pritchett designed an extension, including a new meeting room, library, committee room, strong room and toilets.

In 1884, the original building was demolished, and William Thorp designed a further extension to the meeting house, providing a main entrance onto the newly constructed Clifford Street, a small meeting room, school room, lecture room, two committee rooms, a library, cloakrooms, and accommodation for a caretaker. The old entrance onto Friargate was closed in 1891. In the early 20th century, land at the rear of the meeting house was purchased, for use as a garden.

Although the meeting house of 1817 was grade II listed, in 1979 it was found to be structurally unsafe, and was demolished. Part of the 1884 building was sold off, and later converted into housing. Jones, Stocks and Partners designed a replacement meeting house on the site of the 1817 building, which was completed in 1981. Between 2013 and 2015, the new meeting house was extended, adding an upper storey and a rear turret.

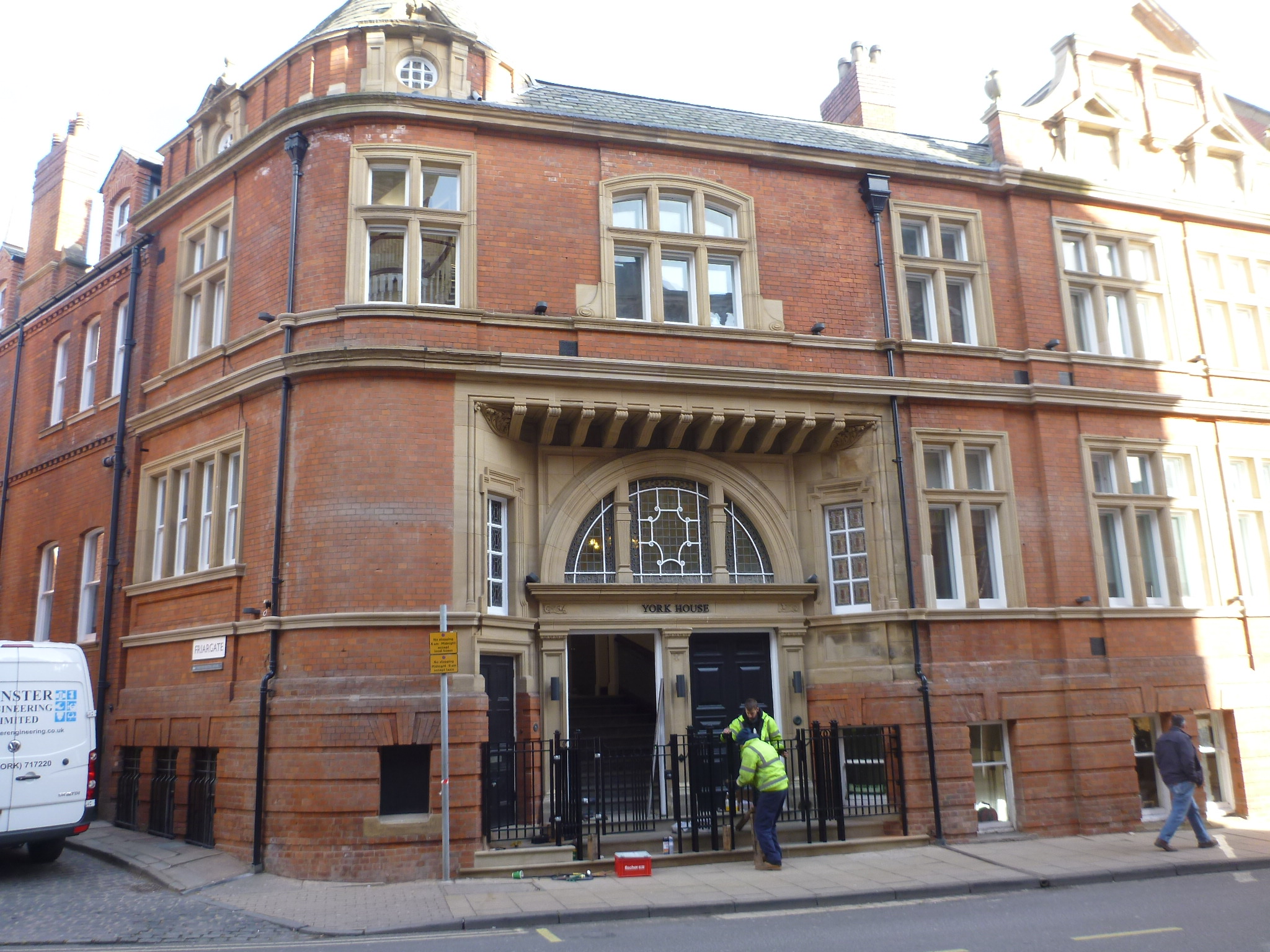
The former building, on Clifford Street

The building is constructed of red brick and is two storeys high at the front, three at the rear. At the front is a canopy, supported by cast iron columns, reused from the 1817 building. At the rear, there is a two-storey turret, in brick with boarding above. Inside, the ground floor comprises a foyer, main meeting room, two smaller rooms, kitchen, library, quiet room and toilets. The main meeting room, originally built as the women's meeting room, has oak panelling, a suspended ceiling, and 19th-century pine benches. The lower ground floor has further meeting rooms and an archives room. The meeting house lies on part of the site of York Franciscan Friary, with a section of its wall being visible in the Woolman Room. On the first floor are four additional meeting rooms.
