= Clifford Street (York) =

Street in York, England

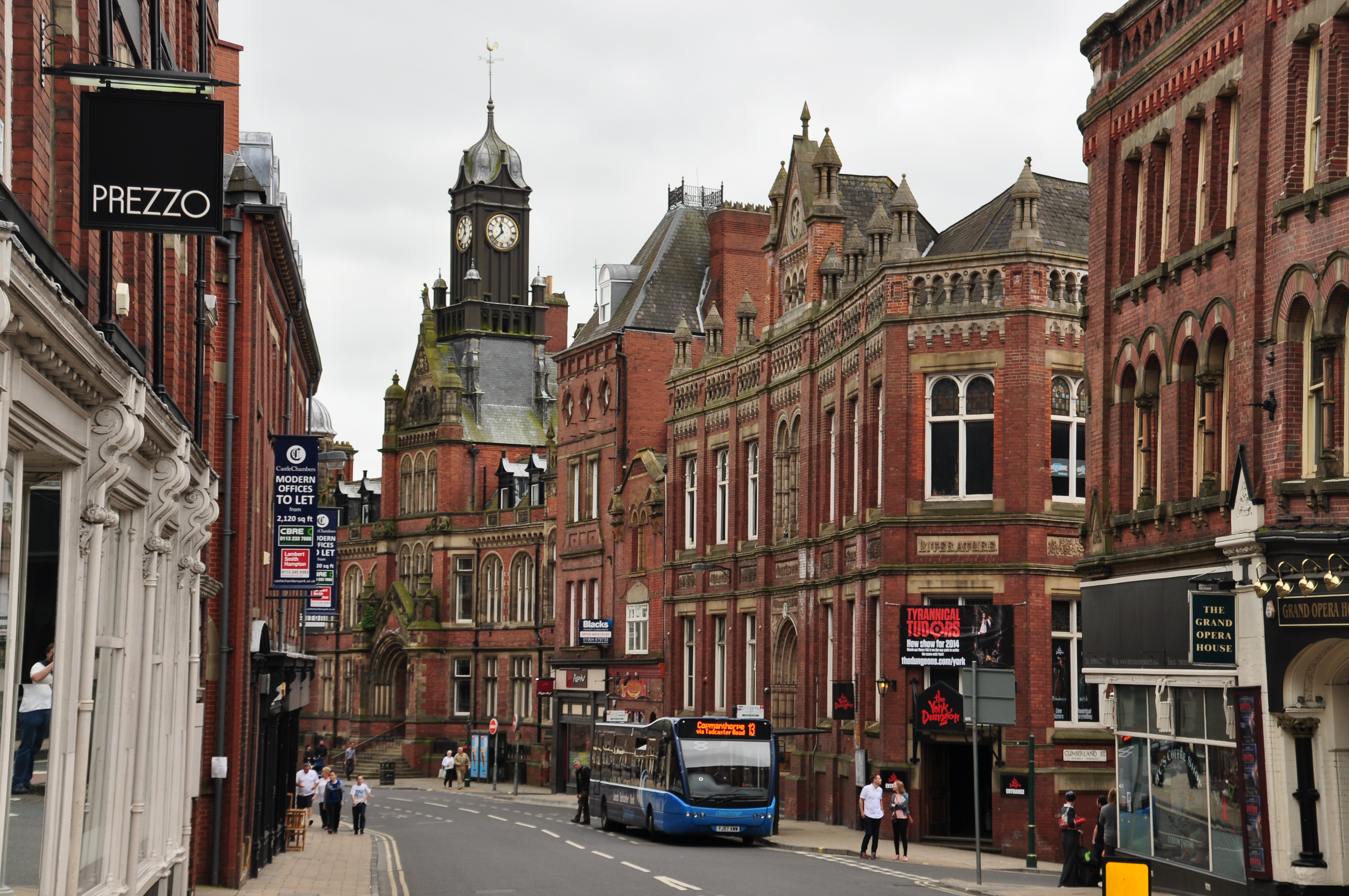
- View south on Clifford Street
- Location within York
- Location: York, England
- Coordinates: 53.9568°N 1.0817°W
- North end: Castlegate; Coppergate; King Street; Nessgate
- South end: Tower Street; Peckitt Lane

Construction
- Completion: 1881

Clifford Street is a road in the city centre of York, in England.

== History ==
The area covered by the street lay outside the walls of Roman Eboracum, but it was occupied during the Viking Jorvik period, with various archaeological finds dating from the era. In the Medieval period, the area was principally residential, the houses lying on Middle Water Lane and Friargate. From 1674, the city's Friends Meeting House was in this area.

By 1881, the area was regarded as a slum, and was cleared so that a new street could be constructed. Designed to improve access to the new Skeldergate Bridge, it was named Clifford Street after nearby Clifford's Tower. The Friends Meeting House was extended, with a new main entrance on the new road. From 1882, the York Tramways Company ran horse-drawn trams along the street. In 1892, a building was opened to house the city' police headquarters and main fire station. The fire station moved to a new building on the street in 1938, which was demolished in 2018 and replaced with apartments. In 1910, the city's electricity board moved into offices on the street, also setting up a showroom. The York Dungeon visitor attraction is located on the street.

Nikolaus Pevsner described the street as "all of a piece with a series of striking red brick buildings in a variety of styles".

== Layout and architecture ==
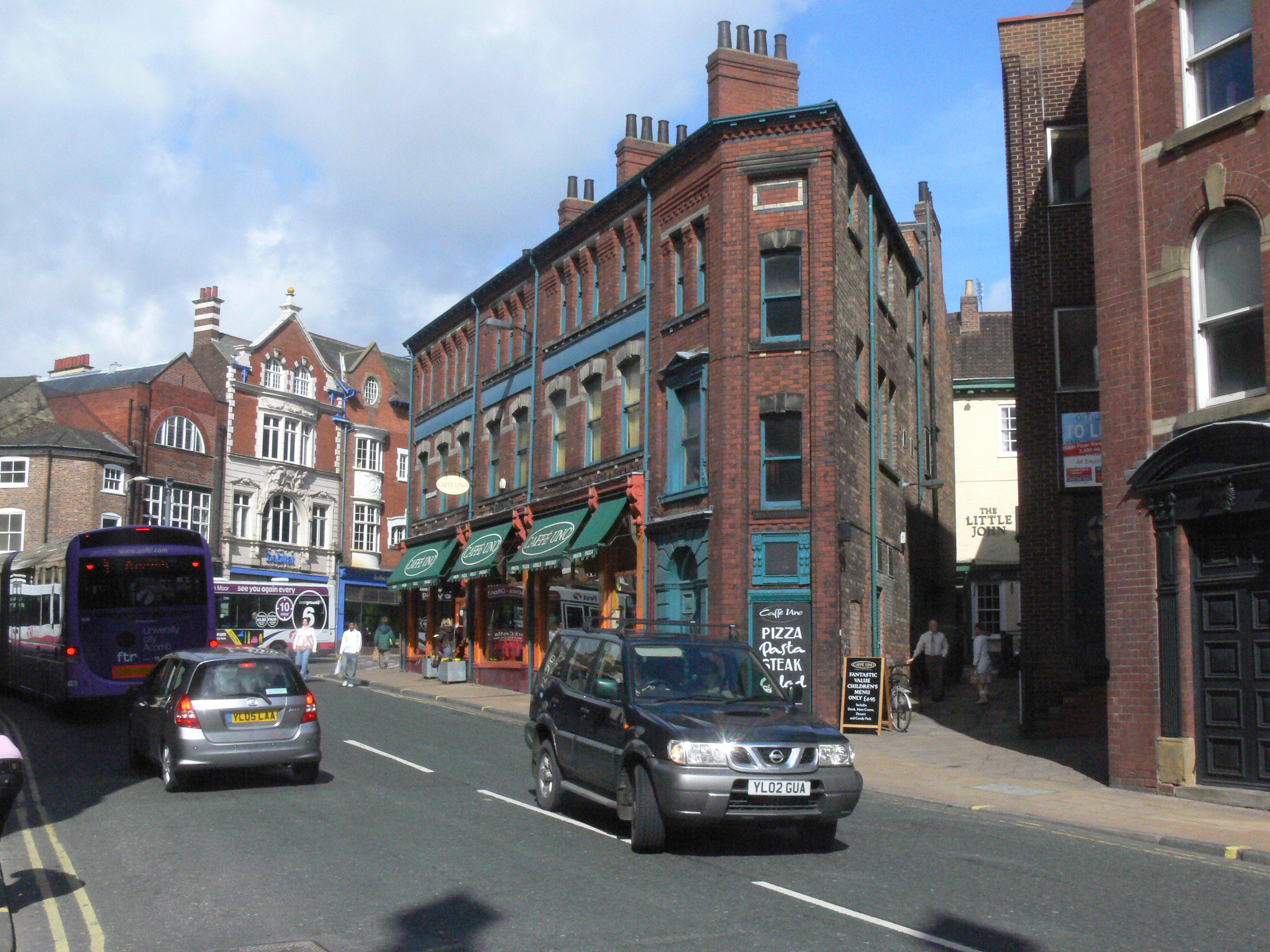
Looking north from the middle of the street

The street runs south from the junction of Castlegate, Coppergate, King Street and Nessgate; to its junction with Tower Street and Peckitt Lane. Cumberland Lane and Lower Friargate lead off its western side, while Friargate leads off its eastern side, as does a snickelway, the former Middle Water Lane, leading to Castlegate.

Notable buildings on the west side of the street include 12 Clifford Street, the former York Institute of Art, Science and Literature, designed by Walter Green Penty; the York Magistrates' Court, designed by Huon Matear; and Clifford Chambers, a block of shops and offices which now includes an entrance to the Grand Opera House theatre. On the east side are York House, formerly part of the Friargate Quaker Meeting House; the office building at 19 Clifford Street; and 21 Clifford Street, built in 1887 for the Independent Order of Rechabites, and later used by the Christadelphians, now apartments.
