= Blue Boar, York =

Listed pub in York, England

Blue Boar
- The pub in 2026
- Former names: Little John

General information
- Type: Public house
- Location: 5 Castlegate, York, England
- Coordinates: 53°57′27″N 1°04′53″W
- Year built: Early 18th century
- Renovated: Mid-19th century (added)
- Owner: Stonegate

Design and construction
- Designations

Listed Building – Grade II
- Official name: The Little John public house and attached carriage gates
- Designated: 17 August 1971
- Reference no.: 1259331

The Blue Boar is a public house on Castlegate in the city centre of York, England.

The Blue Boar was a medieval inn on the street. Among its guests were Roger Cottam, envoy to Henry VII, and many Royalist soldiers preparing for the Siege of York. It was demolished in about 1730 and replaced by the current building, along with the neighbouring 1 and 3 Castlegate. A tradition states that the body of Dick Turpin was kept in the cellar of the pub overnight after his execution, and that the landlord allowed patrons to view the body for a small fee. Another tradition claims that Turpin's ghost haunts the pub.

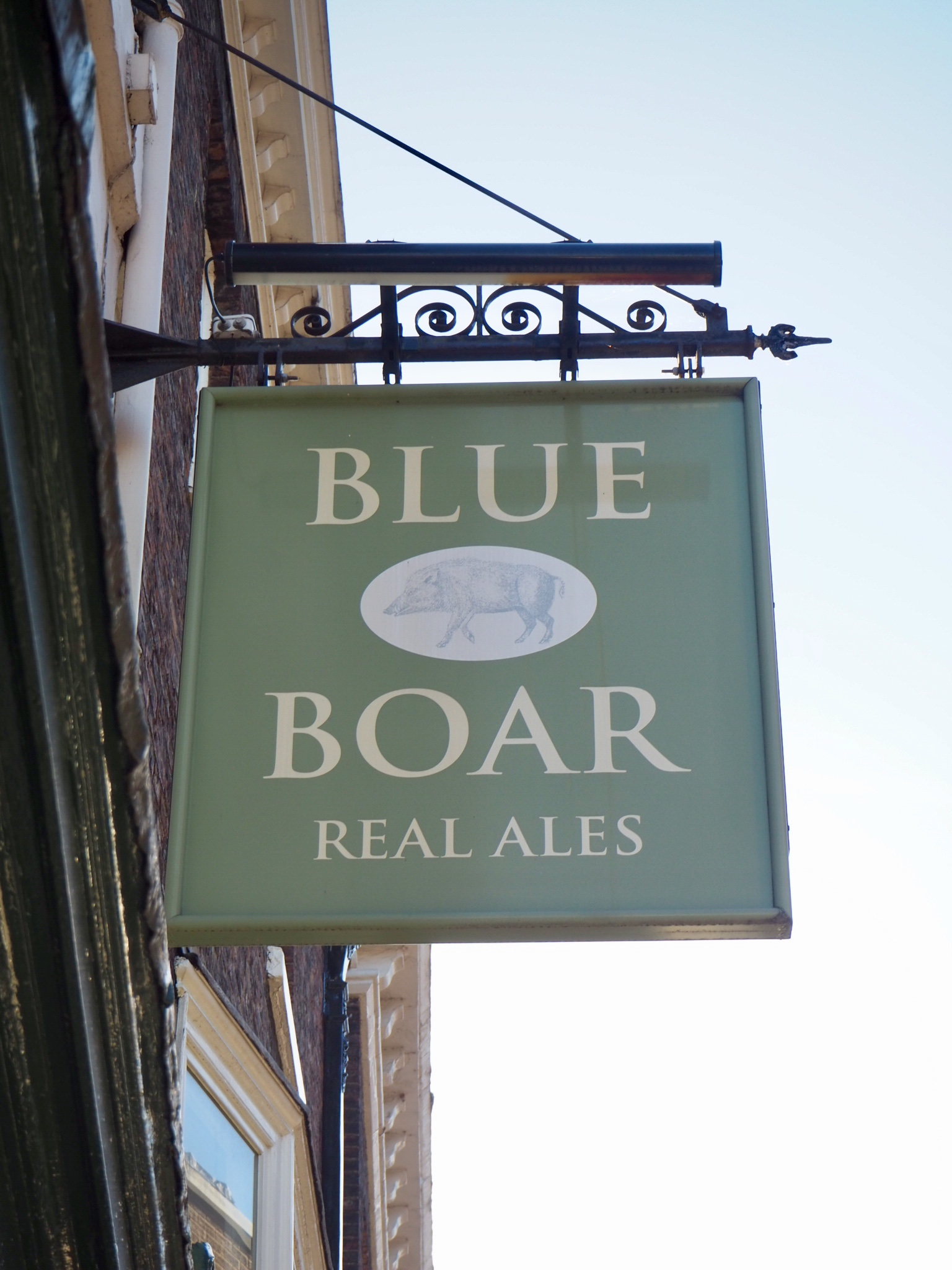
The pub sign in 2018

In 1770, the Robin Hood pub opened on the street, probably as a direct replacement for the Blue Boar, although it is not certain whether it occupied the same building. It became an important coaching inn, with coaches running daily to Hull and Leeds, and from 1816 also to Selby, along with less frequent routes to Richmond, Barnard Castle, Howden and Bubwith. In Walter Scott's The Heart of Midlothian, the Seven Stars pub is thought to be based on Robin Hood.

The front of the pub was rebuilt in 1851, including a carriage arch leading to former stables at the rear, and the pub was extended into part of No. 3. In about 1894 the pub was renamed the Little John. It has since been internally rebuilt, and an extension added. In 1971 it was Grade II listed, along with the attached cast-iron carriage gates.

In the early 21st century, the pub was owned by Enterprise Inns and described itself as "gay-friendly". It closed in 2011 but reopened the following year, returning to the Blue Boar name. As of June 2026 its freehold is owned by Stonegate Pub Company.

== See also ==
- Listed buildings in York (within the city walls, southern part)
