= St Mary's Church, Castlegate, York =

Grade I listed church in York, England

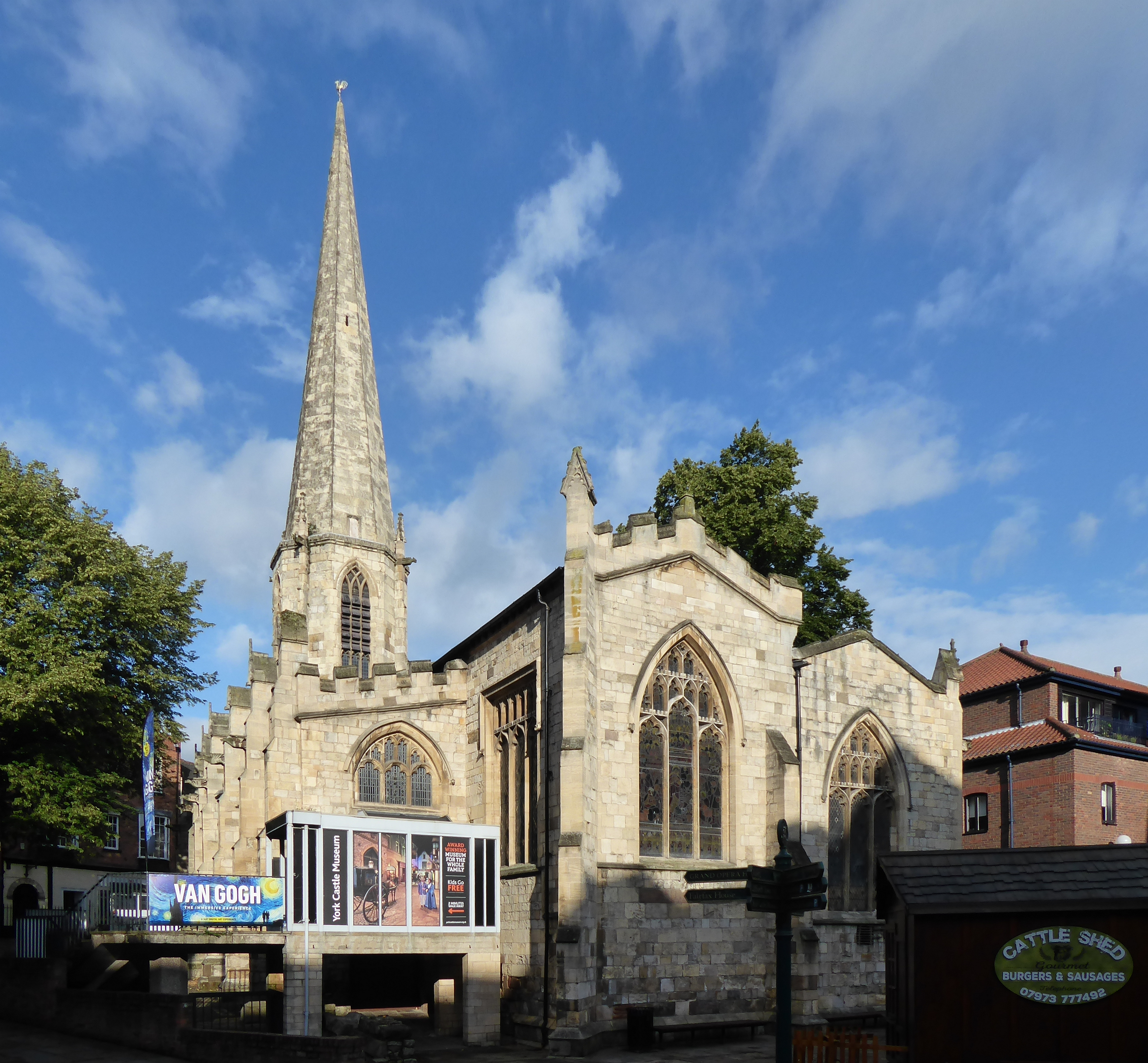
- St Mary's Church, Castlegate, York
- St Mary's Church, Castlegate, York
- 53°57′25.8″N 1°4′49.8″W
- OS grid reference: SE 60440 51624
- Location: Castlegate, York
- Country: England
- Previous denomination: Church of England
- Website: yorkstmarys.org.uk

History
- Dedication: St Mary the Virgin

Architecture
- Heritage designation: Grade I listed
- Completed: 11th century

St Mary's Church is a Grade I listed former parish church in the Church of England on Castlegate in the city of York.

== History ==
The church is located on Castlegate, a historical street in the centre of York. It dates from the 11th century, but the current building is mostly 15th century.

Highwayman John Nevison, who was hanged on the Knavesmire, in March 1684 was buried in an unmarked grave in the churchyard.

The church was restored between 1867 and 1870 when the east window was replaced, the church re-roofed and the east end parapet was renewed by William Butterfield.

== Organ ==
Details of the installation of the original organ are not known, but it was repaired at a cost of £45 by Hopkins of Heworth in 1884. A new organ was obtained in 1892 by Abbott & Co. A specification of the organ can be found on the National Pipe Organ Register. When the church was declared redundant, the organ was moved to St Thomas’ Church, Heigham, Norfolk.

== Exhibition space ==
The church was declared redundant in 1958 and converted by George Pace and Ronald Sims for secular use. It now houses contemporary art exhibitions operated by York Museums Trust. It has hosted exhibitions by Susan Stockwell, Susan Aldworth, and the Aesthetica Art Prize.

In 2016 there were 6,906 visitors to exhibitions in the church.

== See also ==
- Grade I listed buildings in the City of York
- Listed buildings in York (within the city walls, southern part)
