= York Civic Trust =

Heritage organisation of York, England

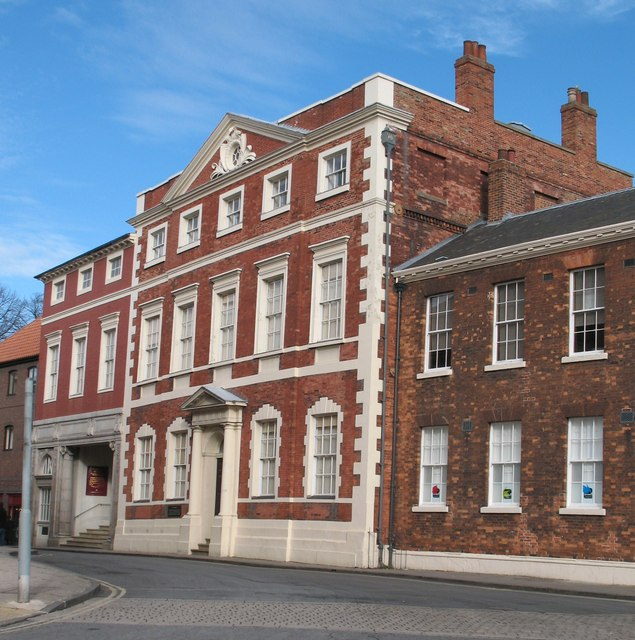
- Fairfax House, headquarters of York Civic Trust
- Formation: 1946; 80 years ago
- Legal status: Charity (no. 229336)
- President: Andrew Scott
- Chair of Trustees: Delma Tomlin
- Board of directors: Chief Executive
- Key people: Andrew Morrison
- Revenue: £1,670,000 (2018-2019)
- Website: yorkcivictrust.co.uk/about/

York Civic Trust is a membership organisation and a registered charity based in York, England. Its primary function is to "preserve, protect and advise on the historic fabric of York". It is based in Fairfax House.

== Foundation ==
York Civic Trust was founded in 1946 in a meeting at the Mansion House between four residents of York: John Bowes Morrell, Oliver Sheldon, Eric Milner-White and Noel Terry. The impetus for the founding of the Civic Trust came from an increasing concern about post-war planning and over-development. The city’s medieval core, and also the buried archaeological heritage of its much longer history, were in considerable danger from the developers. The Archbishop of York, Cyril Garbett, and the Lord Mayor Fred Gaines were in attendance at the first meeting of the Trust. In his speech, the Archbishop referred to the four threats facing the city: time and weather; war (the city had suffered some damage during the Baedeker raid in 1942); commercial greed; and ignorance – especially that of “people who thought they were improving and restoring when really they were ruining and destroying”.

== Activities ==
=== Buildings and public spaces ===
One of the Trust's most prominent activities has been to help provide the impetus for the establishment of the University of York through John Bowes Morrell. It was influential in establishing the first pedestrianised footstreets in York, and in the 1980s this included the closing of Deangate, the road that cut across the Minster precinct and was causing damage to the Minster's foundations. Its role in protecting York's architectural heritage is cited in the Royal Commission volumes on the historical monuments of York.

The Trust has also repurposed several redundant churches in York. For example St Sampson’s is now an old people’s centre and St Margaret’s is now the National Centre for Early Music.

The Trust has contributed to the City Council’s "Streetscape manual" and, through its members, monitors such things as street clutter and degradation, waste disposal sites, wayfinder finger posts and other street identification signs, damage to decorative detail on buildings, and buildings in need of rescue. The Trust has contributed to the development of a series of pocket parks, small quiet areas in the city, like the one adjacent to All Saints' Church.

The Trust maintains a City Enhancement Fund, which is used to help start individual projects in the city. Recent restorations undertaken by the Trust include that of the derelict Rigg Monument, at St Lawrence's Church, York: a memorial to the six children of John and Ann Rigg who drowned in an accident on the River Ouse in 1830. In 2016/17 it campaigned to save the Bridge Lane Gates, originally installed for the former Archbishop Holgate’s Grammar School playing fields, which are now occupied by the York and District Hospital. They were cast in the 1850s at the Walker Iron Foundry in Walmgate, York. Repairs to the Bridge Lane gates were paid for and organised by Trust members and the work was carried out at the workshops of Barker & Patterson in Hull. The City Enhancement Fund has benefited from the sale of a book by the Trust's former Chairman and former President, York, Changing the Face of the City. This was published in 2016 and describes ways in which the city could be improved.

=== Exhibitions ===
In 1998 York Civic Trust commissioned the Statue of Constantine the Great, York from the sculptor Philip Jackson located outside York Minster, which is above the headquarters of the Roman fortress. The Trust held an exhibition of images of York titled "Views of York" in its Fairfax House Museum in 2012. In 2018 the Trust contributed to an exhibition in St Williams College and a book titled The Streets of York, Four centuries of change.

=== Planning oversight ===
The Trust maintains a watching brief on the planning applications which are sent to the City of York Council, and is a recognised body consulted by the Council. Its planning club is led by expert volunteers who are Trust members and has a regular group of University of York post-graduate students working on conservation-related Master's degrees, who meet weekly to scrutinise new or revised planning applications. Its planning committee then makes representations to the City Council. In advance it sometimes holds consultation seminars with members and the public. Such seminars on “York Futures” have invited public views on the future direction of York, on areas of York such as the Castle Gateway or the railway station, and on the preparation of a draft local plan and of changes to transport policy in York. The Trust aims to protect important and significant parts of the city from intrusive development, such as those which are next to the city walls or the moat around the walls, or next to the Bars (the gates) of the walls or other architectural landmarks.

=== Education ===
Each year since 2013 the Trust has organised two public-speaking competitions, one for primary school children and for one for secondary school children. Highlights are available on Youtube. It has also developed four education packs for teachers of children of primary school age, which are available electronically. The packs cover York Suffragettes; Life in York's Victorian Workhouse; York in World War I and York in World War II. At Civic Days in June, as part of its drive to raise its profile, experts have offered free walking tours of York.

=== Commemorative plaques ===
York Civic Trust has issued and maintains over a hundred commemorative plaques to people, places or events in the city of York, beginning in 1951 and featuring the Trust's emblem.

Blue plaques in the city include dedications to Alcuin, the poet W. H. Auden, the nineteenth-century architect GT Andrews, the comedian Frankie Howerd, Guy Fawkes’ house in Stonegate, and one to commemorate Richard III’s investiture of his son as Prince of Wales in York in 1484. Recent additions have included plaques to: Henry Baines, Anne Lister and partner Ann Walker, Elizabeth Montagu, George Butterworth, James Backhouse, and John Snow.

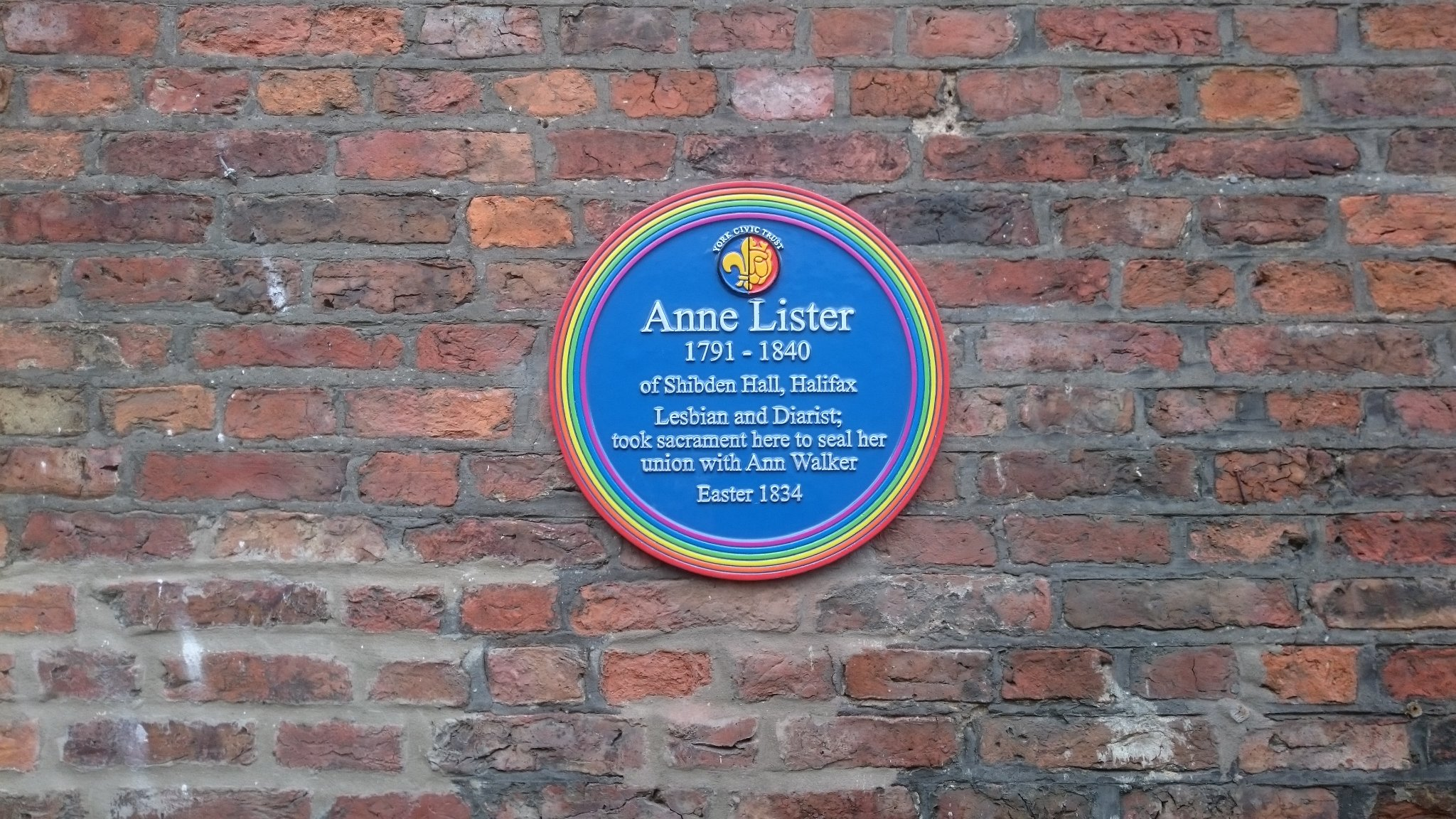

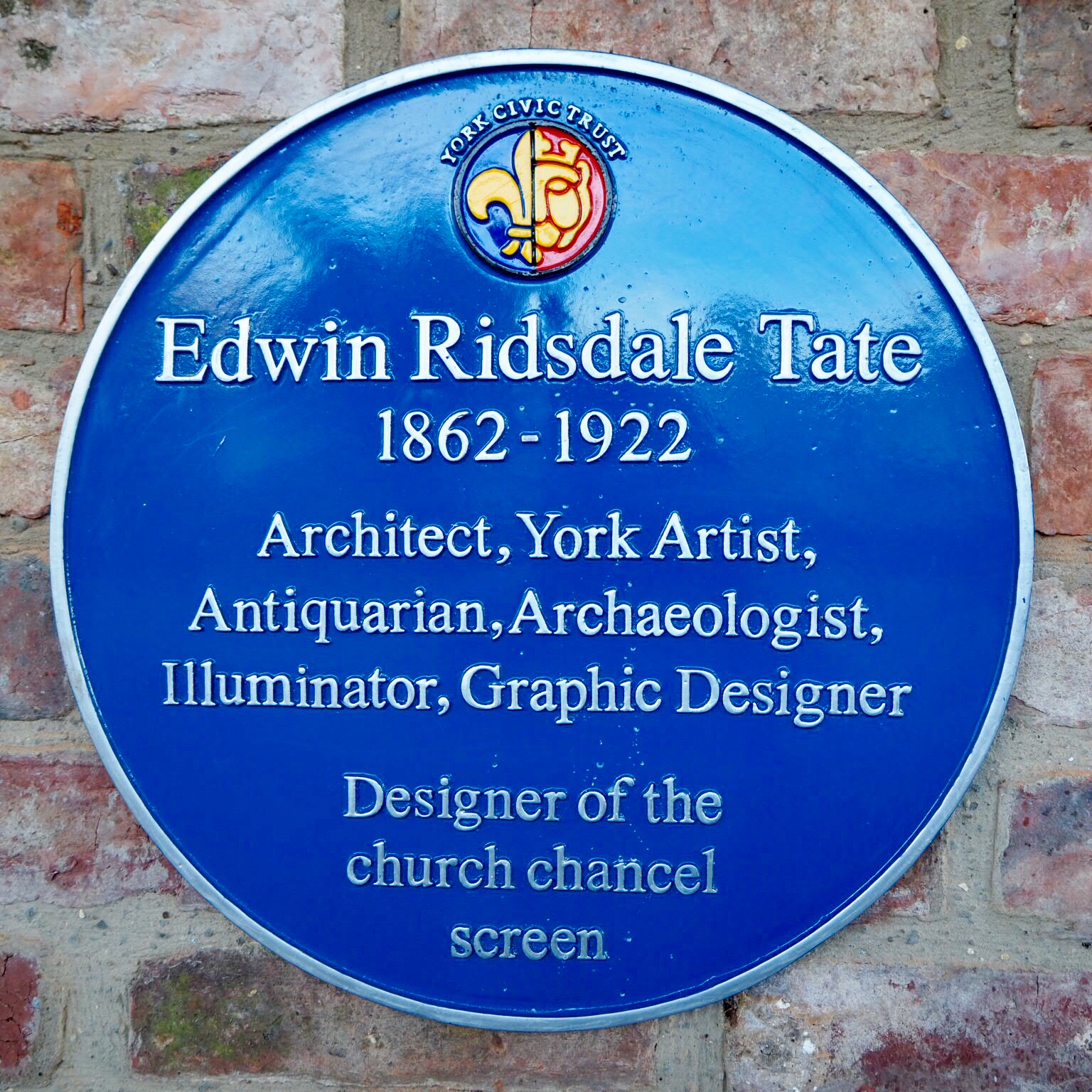

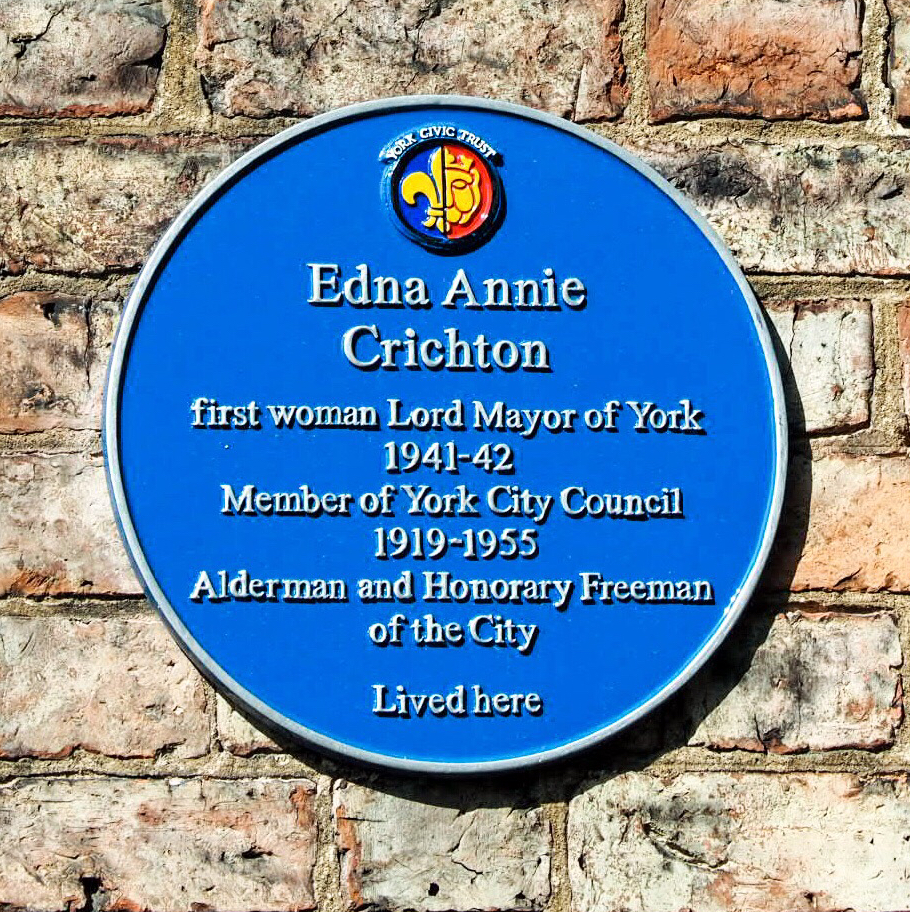

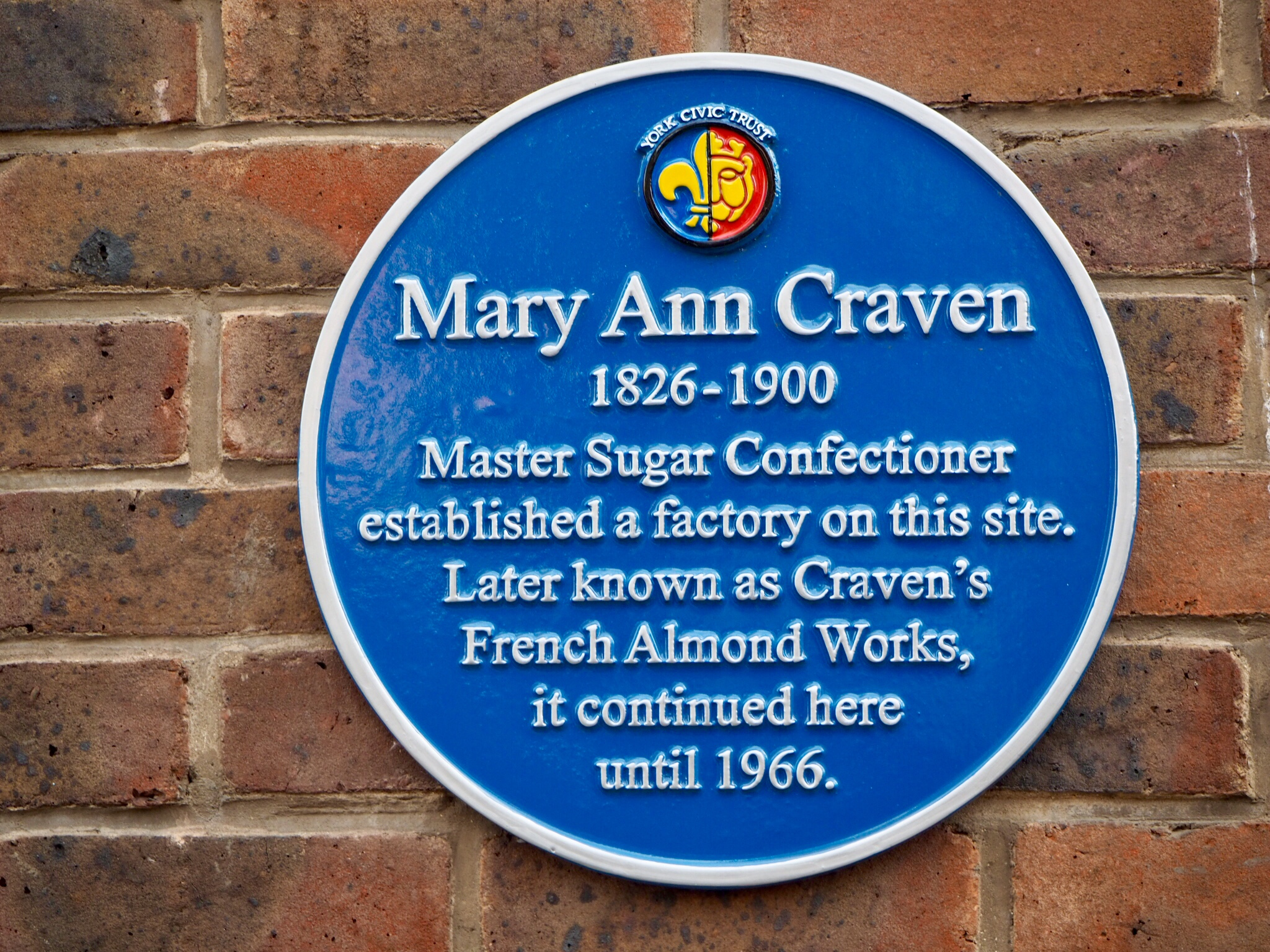

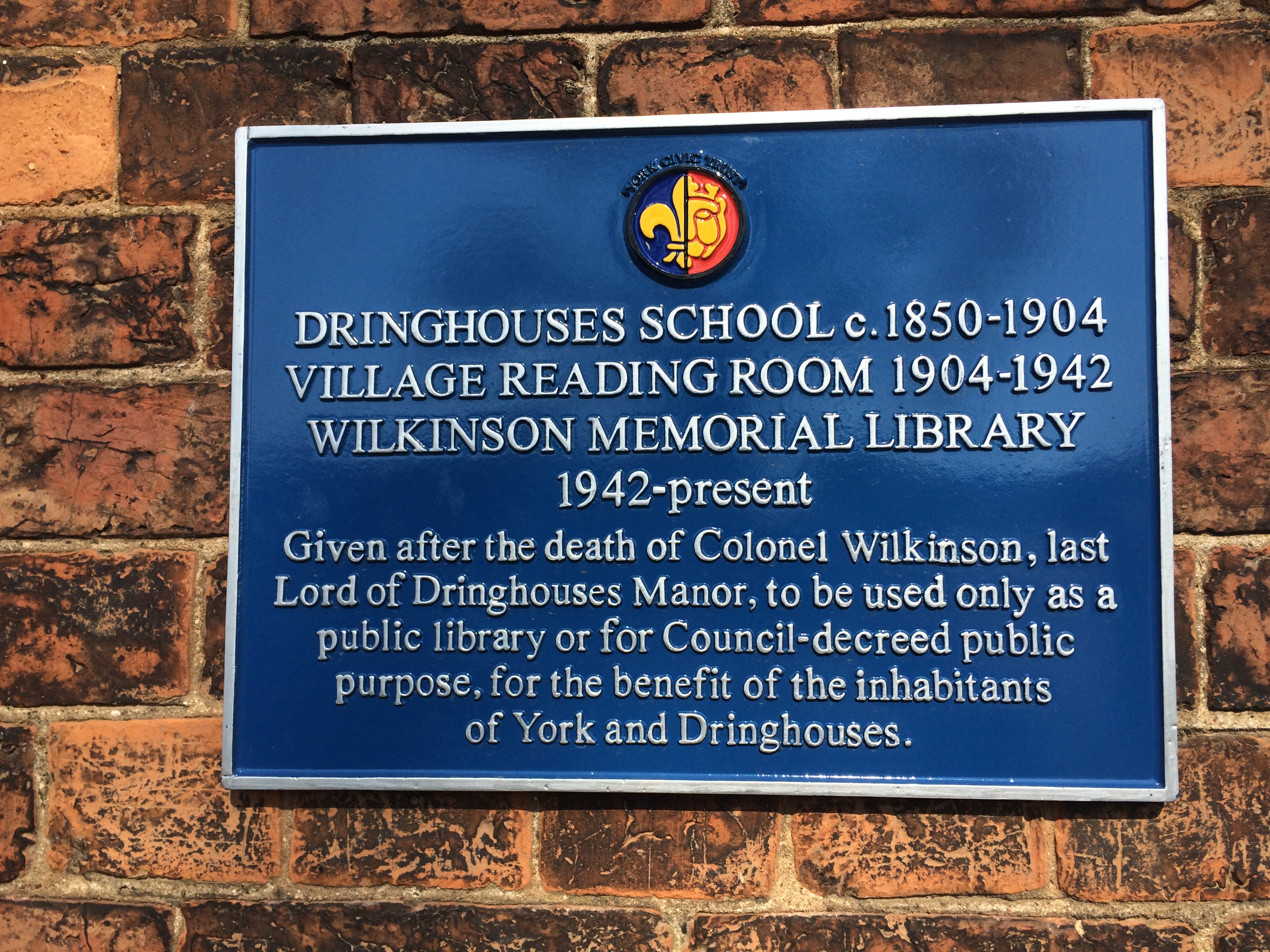

== Governance ==
The Trustees who form the Board of York Civic Trust employ a full-time chief executive and other part-time staff from its headquarters in Georgian Fairfax House, on Castlegate. It is a member of the Yorkshire and Humber Association of Civic Societies.
