= Fairfax House =

Grade I listed building in York, England

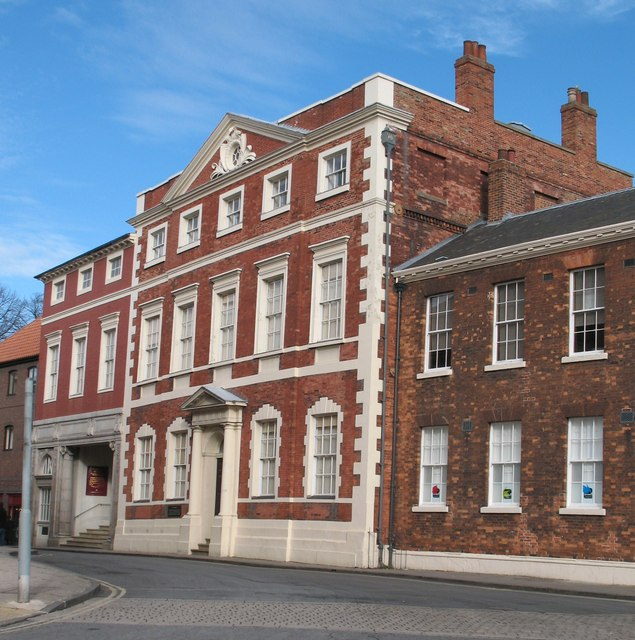
- Fairfax House (centre), seen from York Castle

- Location within York City Centre

General information
- Type: House (formerly cinema and ballroom; originally houses)
- Location: 25 and 27 Castlegate, York, England
- Coordinates: 53°57′24″N 1°04′48″W
- Years built: c. 1744 (No. 27); Early 19th century (No. 25)
- Renovated: 1760–1762 (No. 27 remodelled); 1920 (amalgamated, converted to cinema and ballroom); 1982–1984 (restored to residential use)

Design and construction
- Designations

Listed Building – Grade I
- Official name: Fairfax House
- Designated: 14 June 1954
- Reference no.: 1259337

Website
- fairfaxhouse.co.uk

Fairfax House is a Georgian townhouse on Castlegate in York, England, near Clifford's Tower and York Castle Museum. It was probably built in the early 1740s for a local merchant and in 1759 it was purchased by Charles Gregory Fairfax, 9th Viscount Fairfax of Emley, who arranged for the interior to be remodelled by John Carr. Fairfax was the widower of heiress Elizabeth Clifford, daughter of Hugh Clifford, 2nd Baron Clifford of Chudleigh: his inheritance from her death enabled him to purchase the house, which he intended as a home for his daughter from his first marriage, Ann Fairfax.

After the Viscount's death in 1772, the house was sold and subsequently passed through a number of local families before spending some time as a Gentleman's Club, a Building Society and a cinema. The property was bought by York Civic Trust in the 1980s and completely restored to its former grandeur. Fairfax House is now a museum open to the public and a Grade I listed building.

== History ==
In 1761, Viscount Fairfax employed the Yorkshire architect John Carr to remodel the house at 27 Castlegate. The work was completed in 1765. The interior has some of Yorkshire's finest mid-18th-century plasterwork by James Henderson (fl. c. 1755–1778) and Giuseppe (Joseph) Cortese (fl. c. 1745–1778) and carved woodwork. The wrought iron balustrades on the staircases were by Maurice Tobin (fl. 1762) Wrought iron gates and railings fronting Castlegate were removed when the street was widened, but were recorded by York architect and artist Ridsdale Tait.

Close-up of the former cinema entrance, now the entrance to Fairfax House

Viscount Fairfax died in 1772 and his title became extinct. Subsequent occupants included Sir Walter Vavasour, 6th Baronet of Haslewood (1780), William Danby (1787), Peregrine Wentworth (1792), Sir John Lister Kaye, 1st Baronet Lister-Kaye of Grange (1820) and Mrs Ann Mary Pemberton (1840–1865). At some point after this, Fairfax House, renamed St George's Hall, became neglected and fell into disrepair, and in the late 19th and early 20th century part of the property was used as a dance hall. In 1921, St George's Cinema, adjacent to Fairfax House, was opened and the building was expanded. It closed in 1970 and the City Council acquired the dilapidated building. The City sold it to York Civic Trust, which between 1982 and 1984 under architect Francis Johnson renovated the building and turned the defunct cinema's entrance into the main entrance to Fairfax House. The York Conservation Trust subsequently purchased the house, leasing it back to the Civic Trust.

On the death in 1980 of Noel Terry (of the Terry's chocolate business), his collection of Georgian furniture and clocks was donated to York Civic Trust and subsequently housed in the period rooms of Fairfax House. The collection has since been expanded by acquisition and donation, including in summer 2017 a re-discovered wooden panel carved by Grinling Gibbons while learning his trade in York. The house has a large collection of Georgian glass and is unique in that 99% of the furniture is English made making it one of the finest collections of English Georgian furniture in Europe. In 2023, a portrait of Elizabeth Clifford, wife of the last Viscount Fairfax, was acquired for the collection.

== Gallery ==
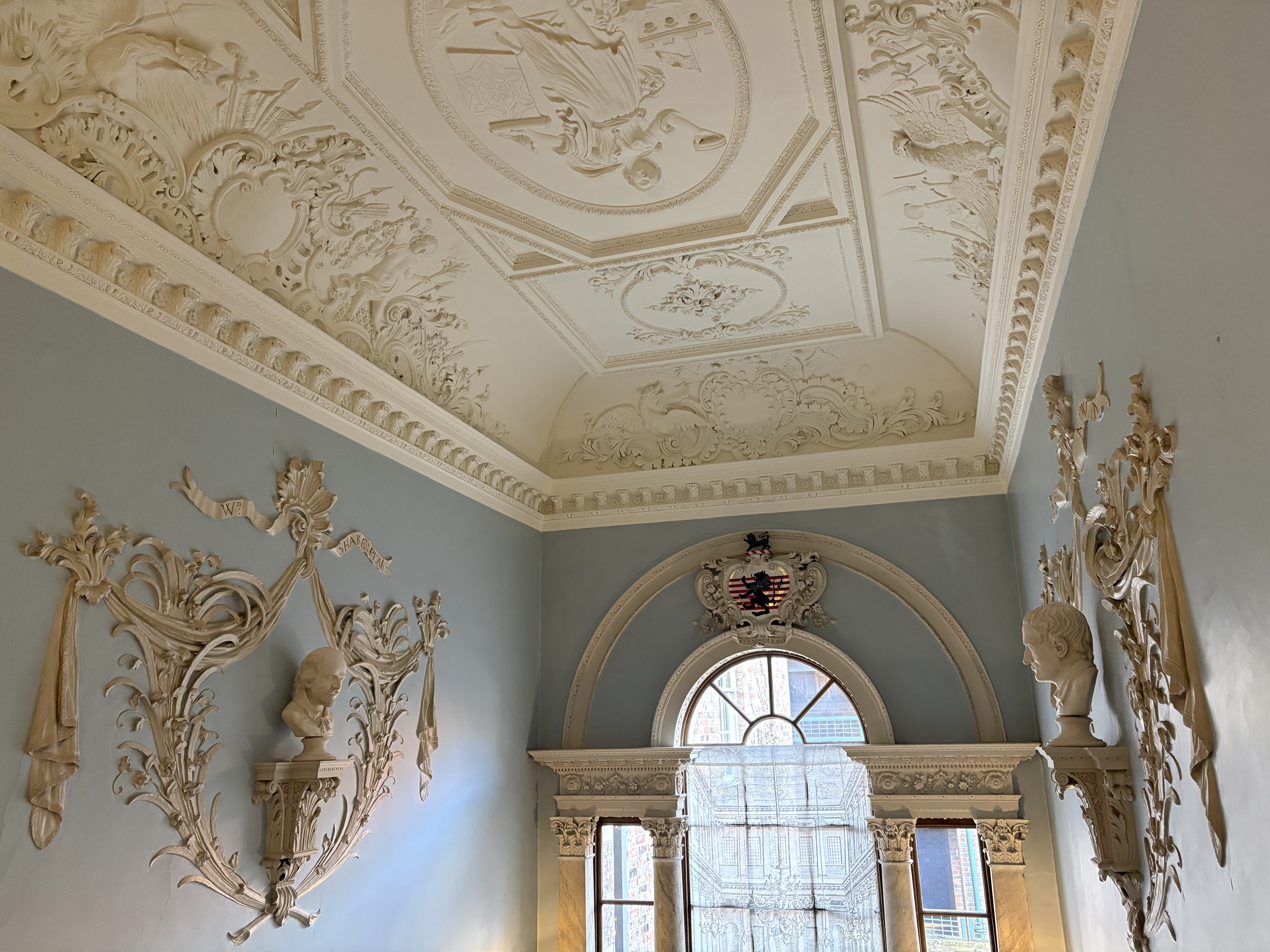
The grand staircase

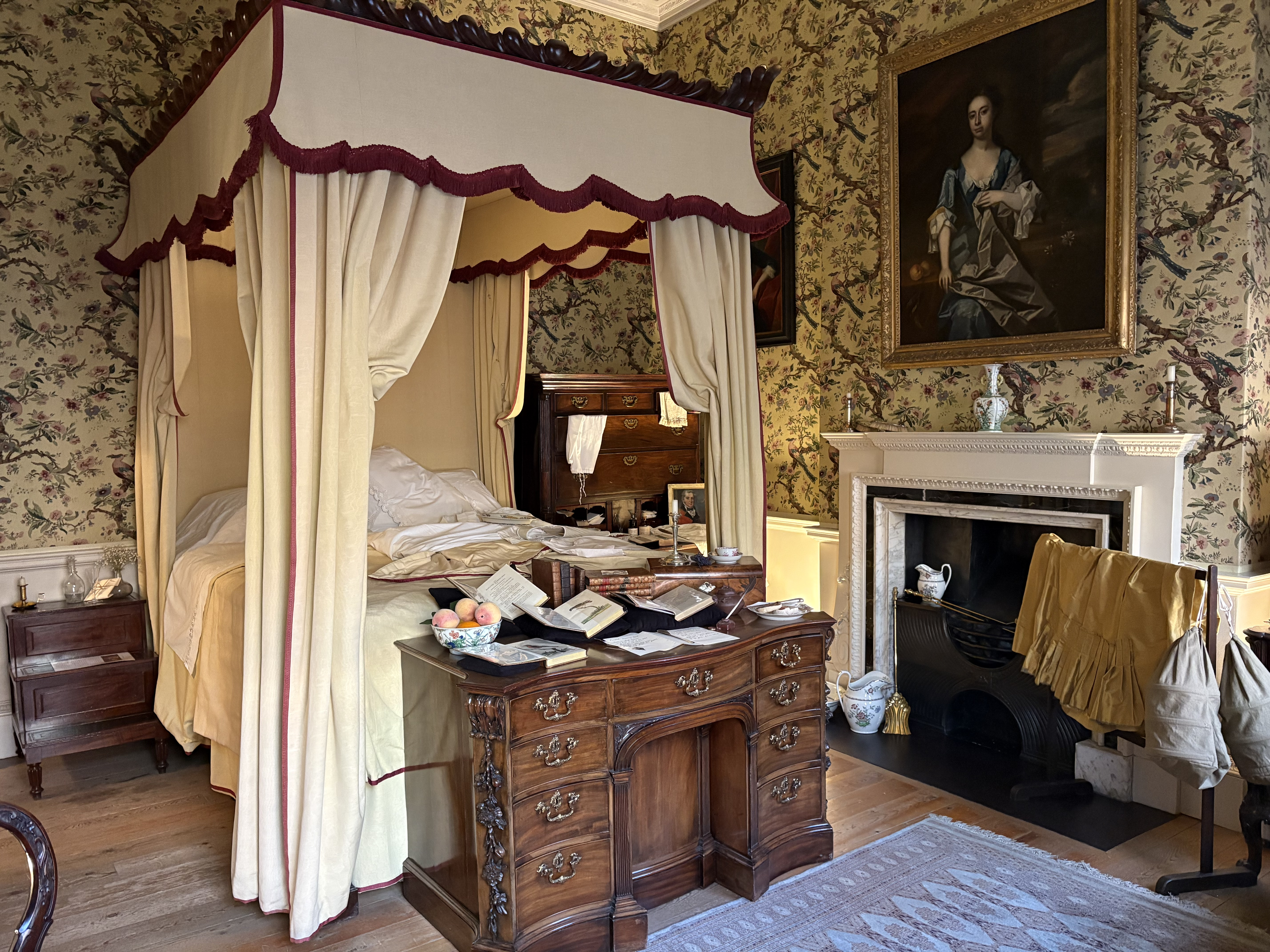
Ann's bedroom

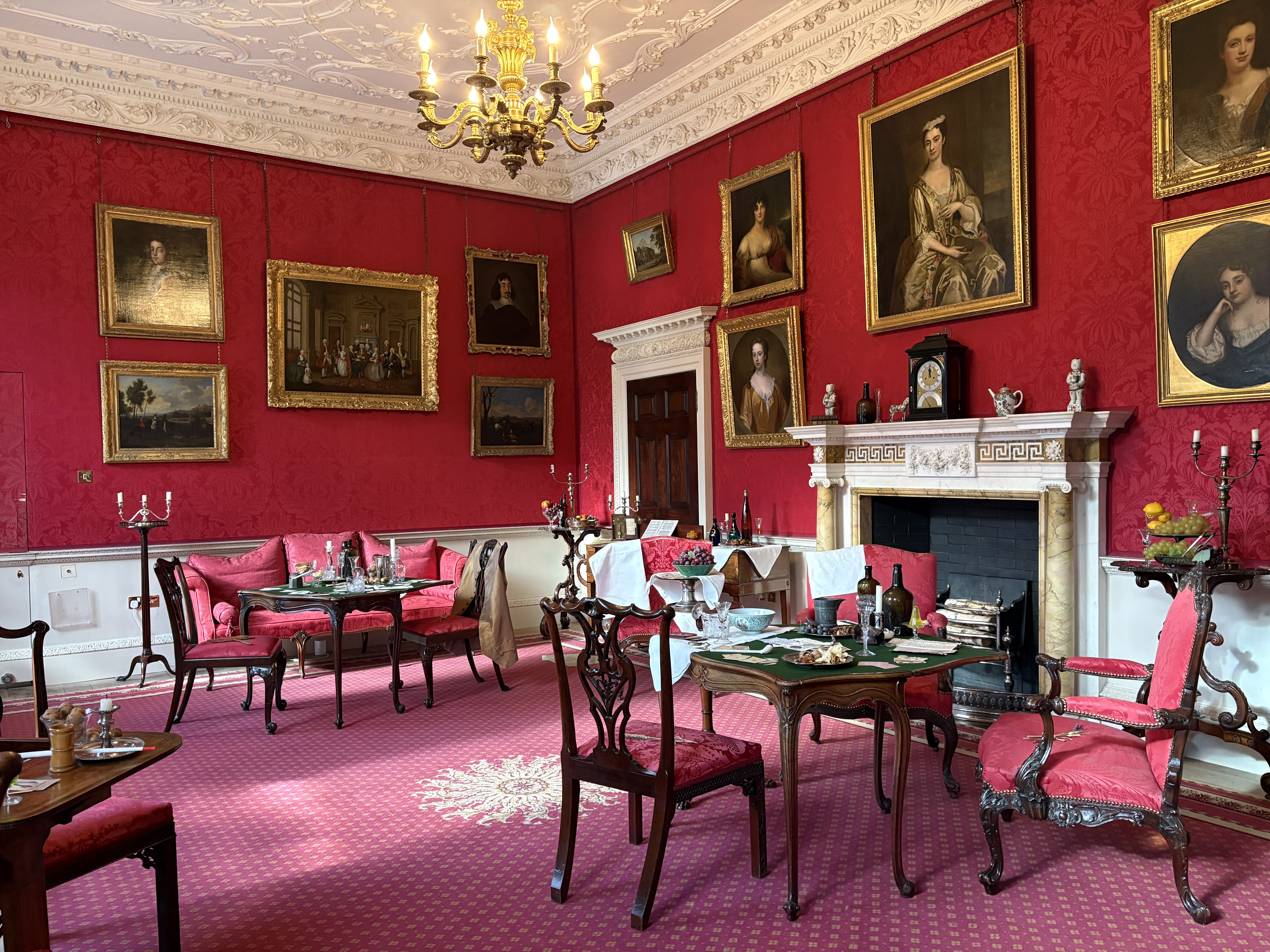
The saloon

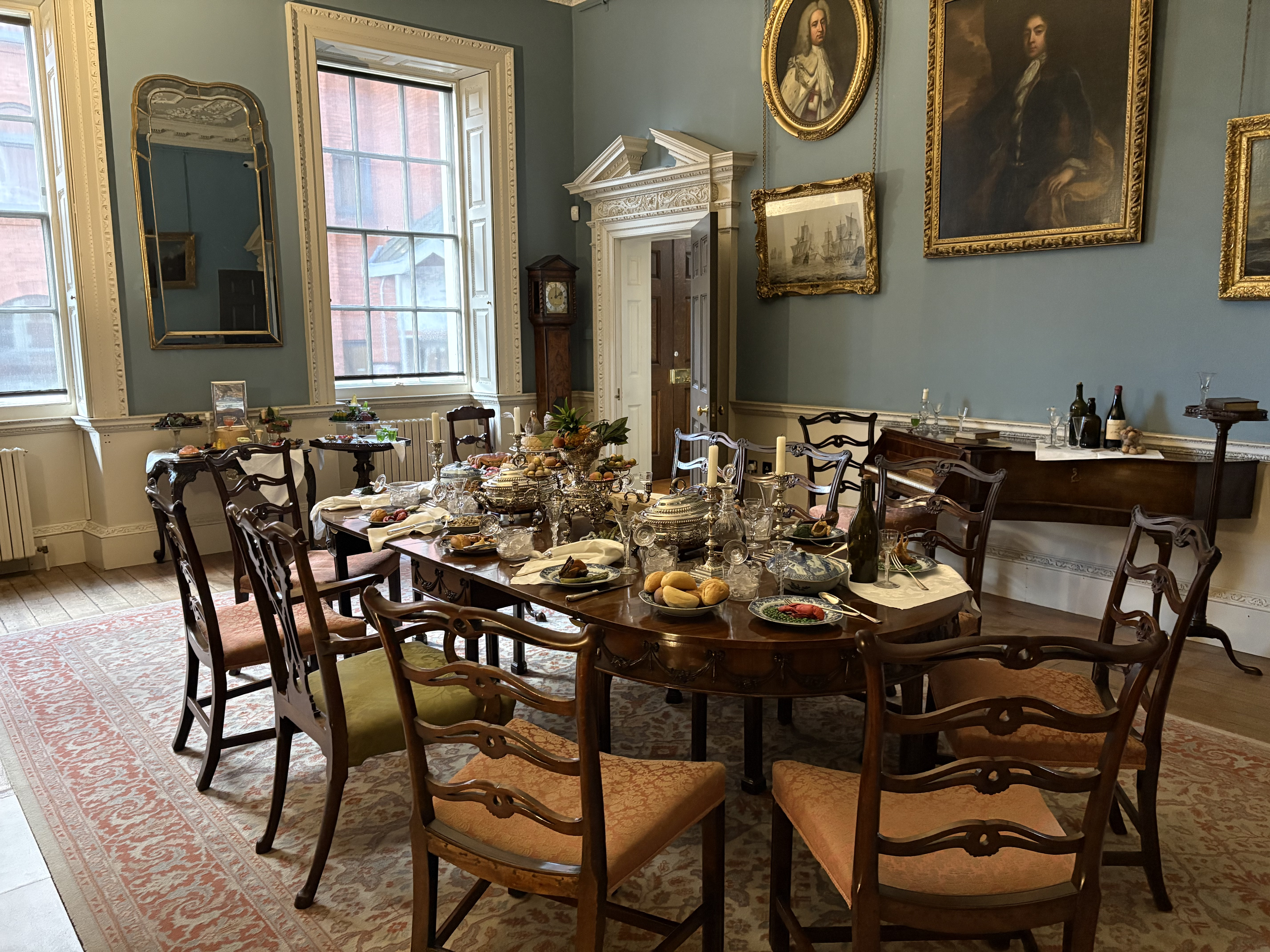
The dining room

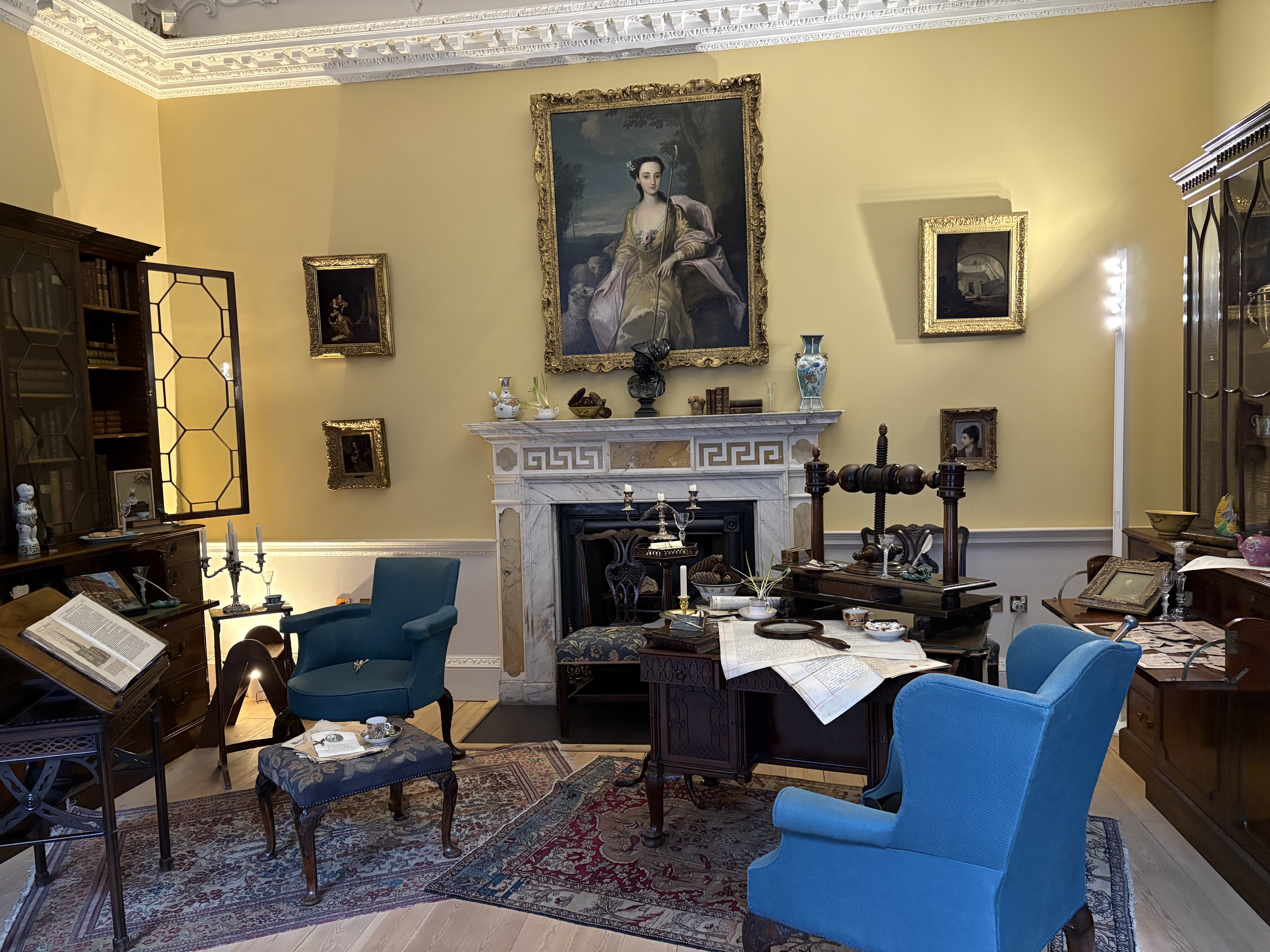
The library

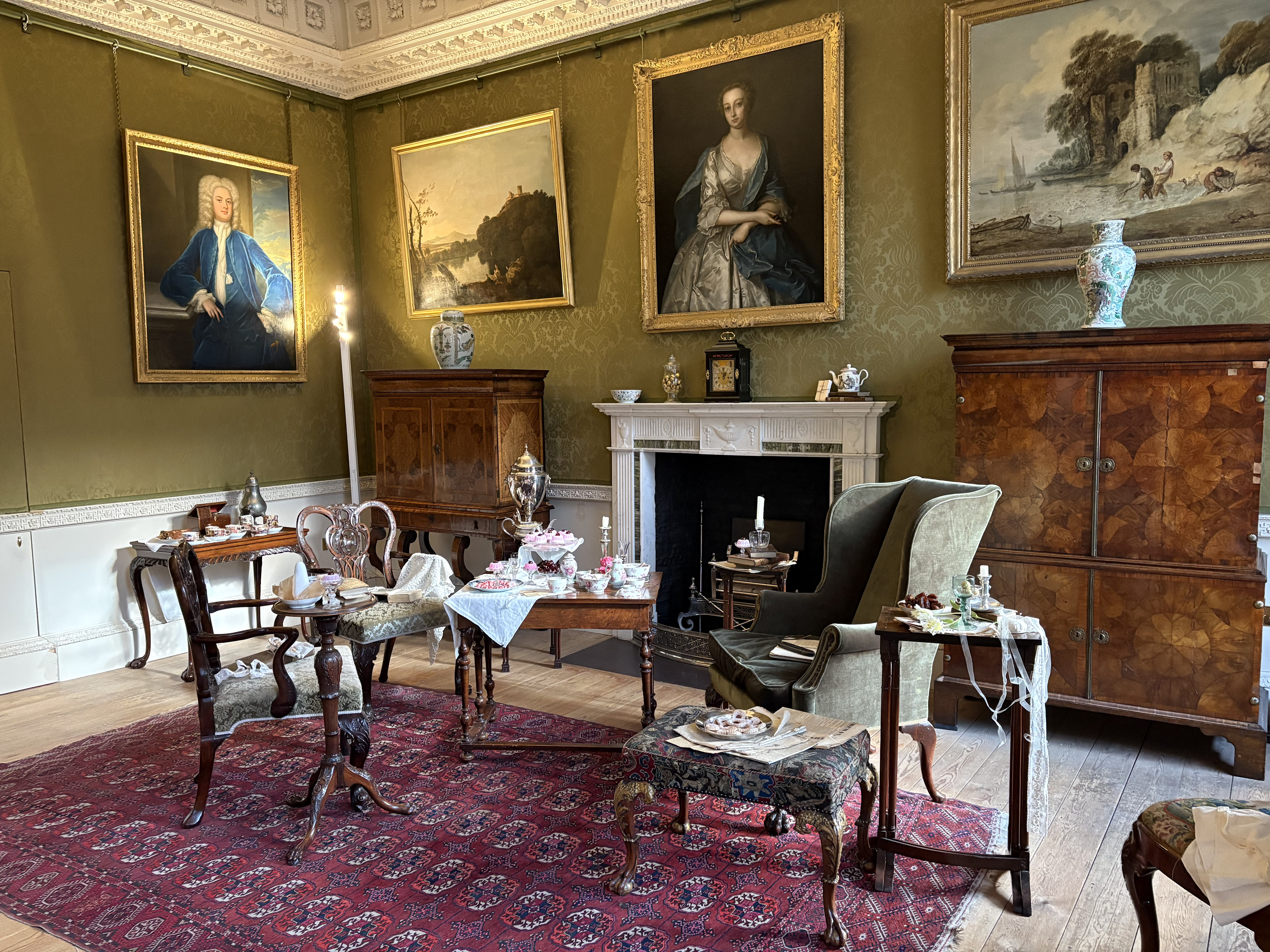
The drawing room

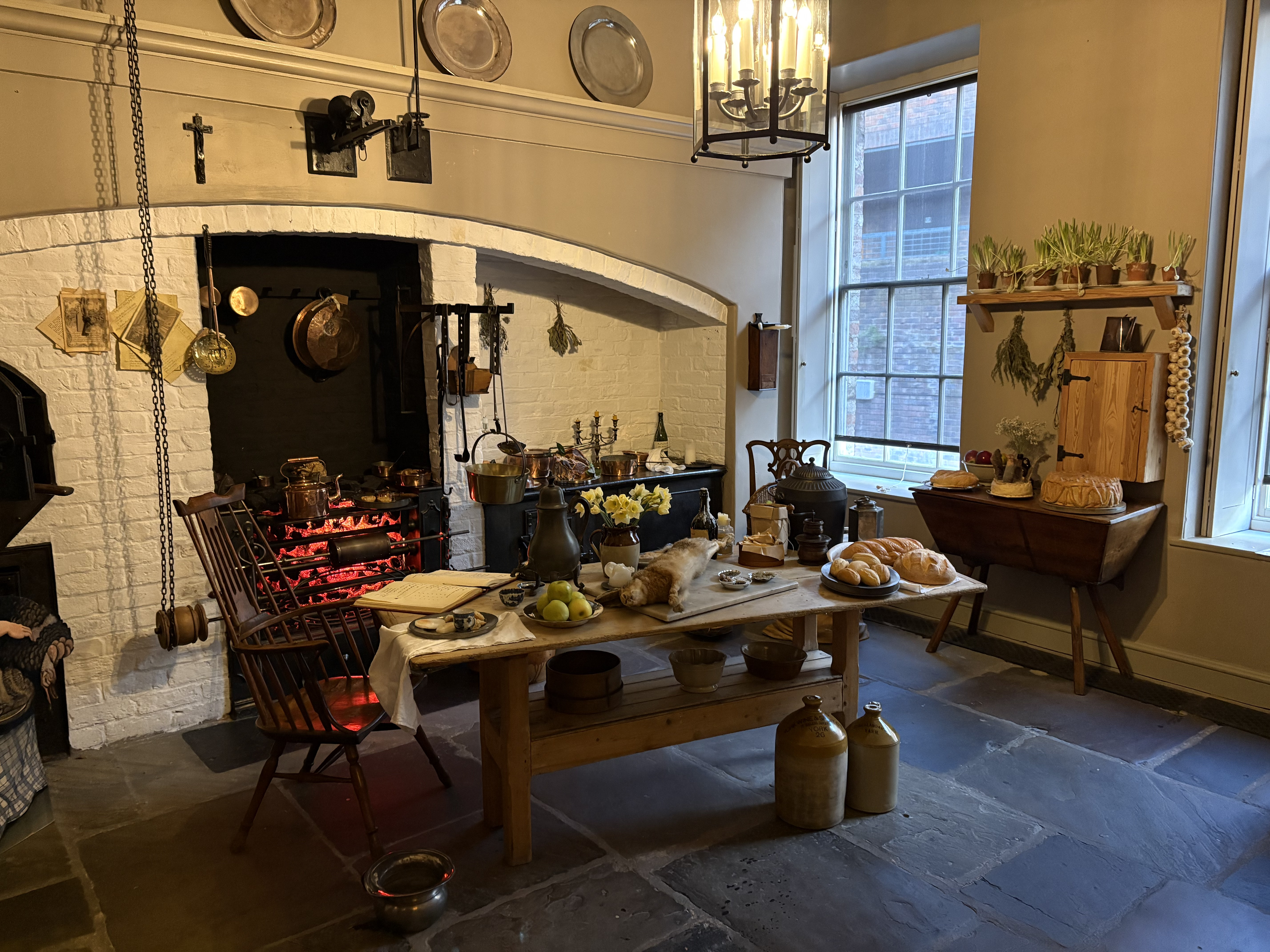
The kitchen

== See also ==
- Grade I listed buildings in the City of York
- Listed buildings in York (within the city walls, southern part)
