= Castlegate (York) =

Street in York, England

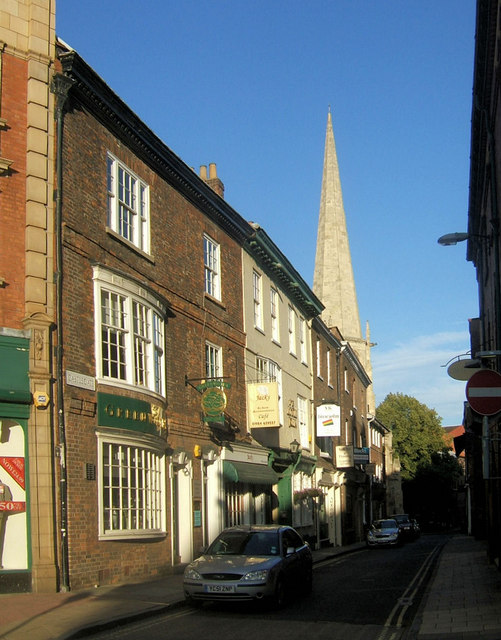
- View south-west along Castlegate
- Location within York
- Location: York, England
- Coordinates: 53.9570°N 1.0806°W
- North west end: Clifford Street; Coppergate; King Street; Nessgate
- Major junctions: Friargate
- South east end: Tower Street

Castlegate is a historic street in York, England, which leads to York Castle.

== History ==
The street roughly follows a Roman road which ran between the fortress of Eboracum and the River Ouse. Remains of residential Roman buildings have been found in excavations. A hoard from the Viking Jorvik period has also been found, while St Mary's Church, on the street's north-east side, appears to have pre-Conquest origins.

In the Mediaeval period, Castlegate linked the city of York with the bailey of York Castle, although no references to it are known from before the 14th-century. In this period, its north-east side was dominated by St Mary's, and its south-west side by the York Franciscan Friary.

In the Georgian period, Castlegate was a desirable location, and the mansions of Fairfax House and Castlegate House were erected. It was shortened slightly in 1826, when the castle's prison was extended. The street lost importance after 1881, when Clifford Street was constructed to its west, providing a more direct route out of the city.

From 1913 until 1954, the headquarters of the Yorkshire Gazette were on Castlegate. In 1921, the St George's Hall cinema opened, closing in 1959.

The street currently hosts a mixture of commercial and residential uses, including a small chocolate factory. It was pedestrianised in 2020.

== Layout and architecture ==
The street runs south-east, from the junction of Clifford Street, Coppergate, King Street and Nessgate; to its junction with Tower Street, at the Castle Car Park. Friargate leads off its south-west side, while there is access to the Coppergate Shopping Centre from its north-east side.

Notable buildings on the north-east side include 1-5 Castlegate, built about 1730 and including the Blue Boar pub; 7 Castlegate, which is mid-18th century; 9-11 Castlegate, built in 1766; St Mary's Church; Fairfax House; and large 19th-century houses at 29 and 31 Castlegate. On the south-west side lie 12-16 Castlegate, built about 1730; 18 Castlegate, also early 18th-century; 22 Castlegate, built in the late-18th century but including part of the wall of the Franciscan Friary; and Castlegate House.

== Gallery ==
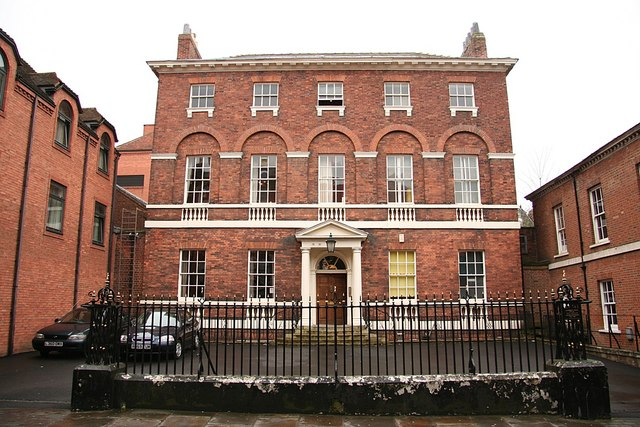
Castlegate House

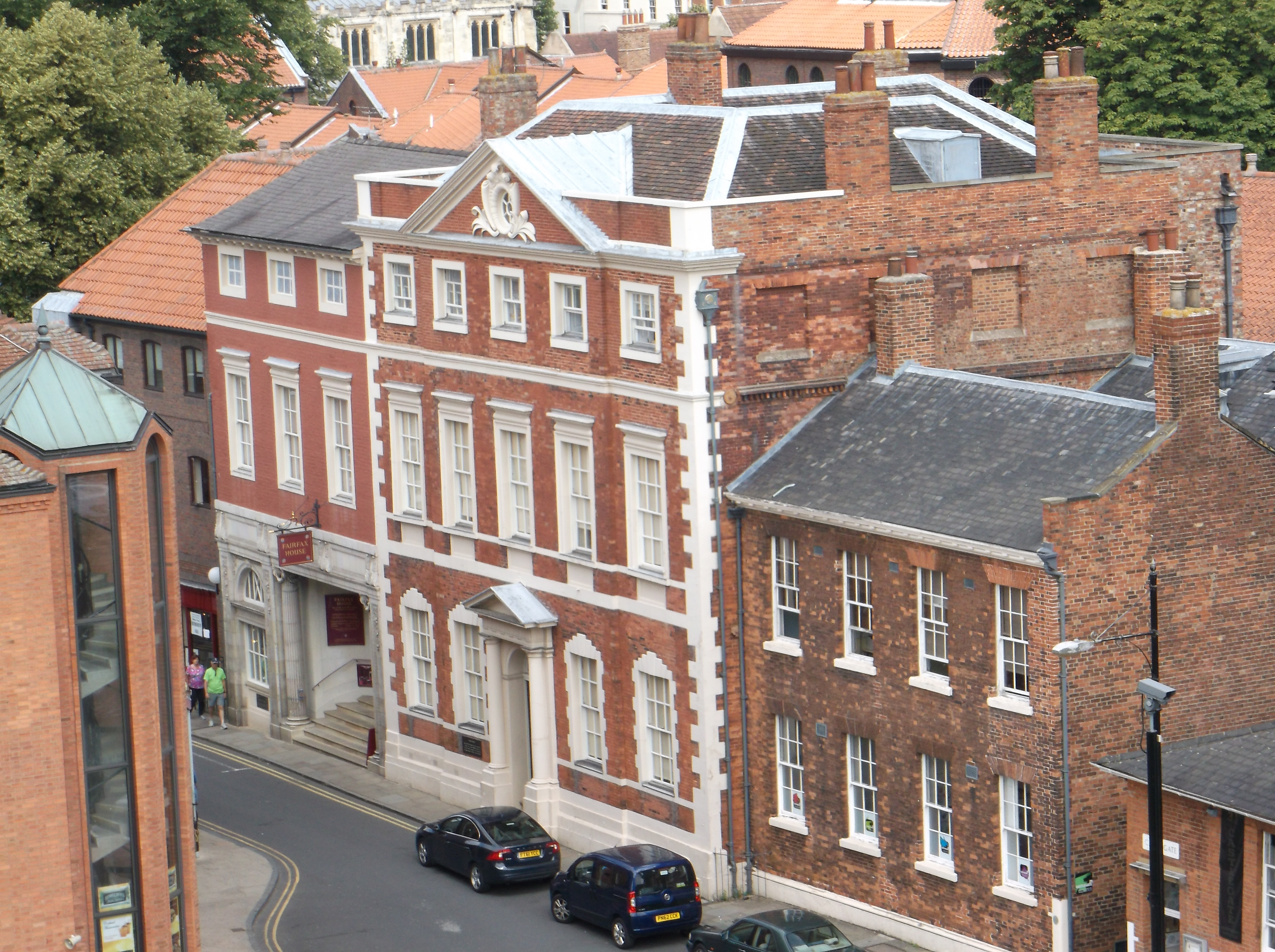
Fairfax House, as viewed from Clifford's Tower

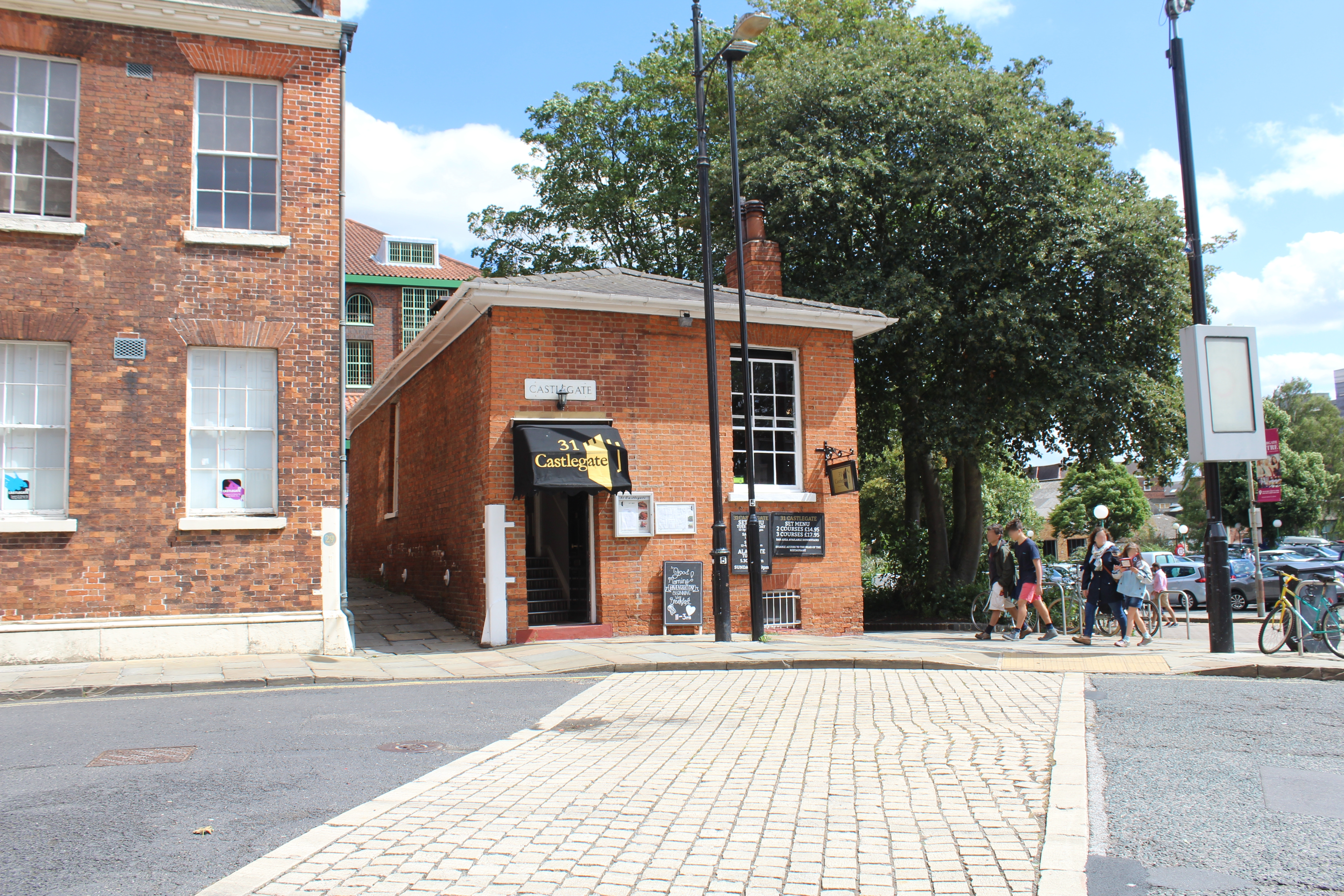
Maison 31, Castlegate

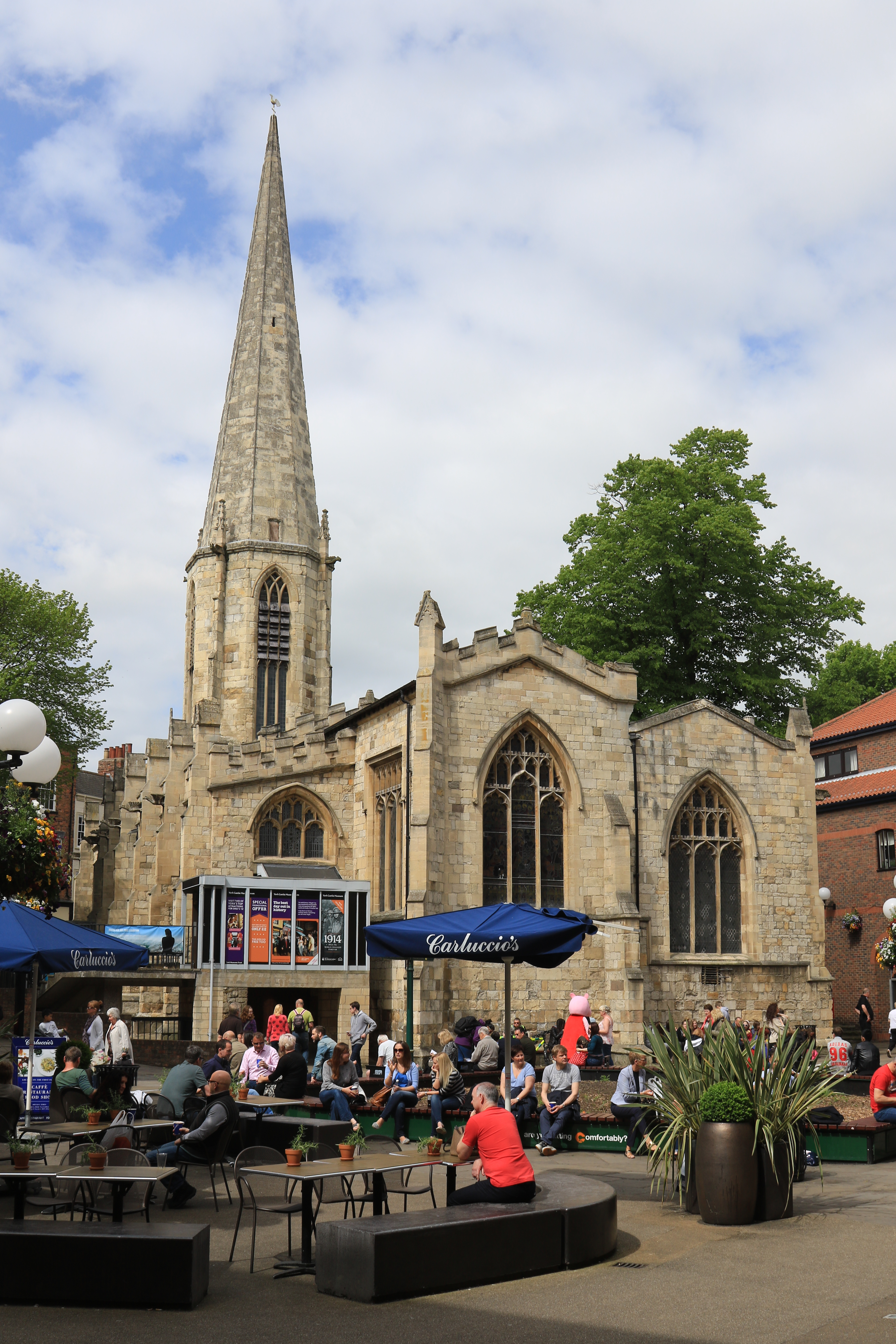
St Mary's Church
