= York Franciscan Friary =

Former friary in York, England

Coordinates: 53.9548°N 1.0814°W

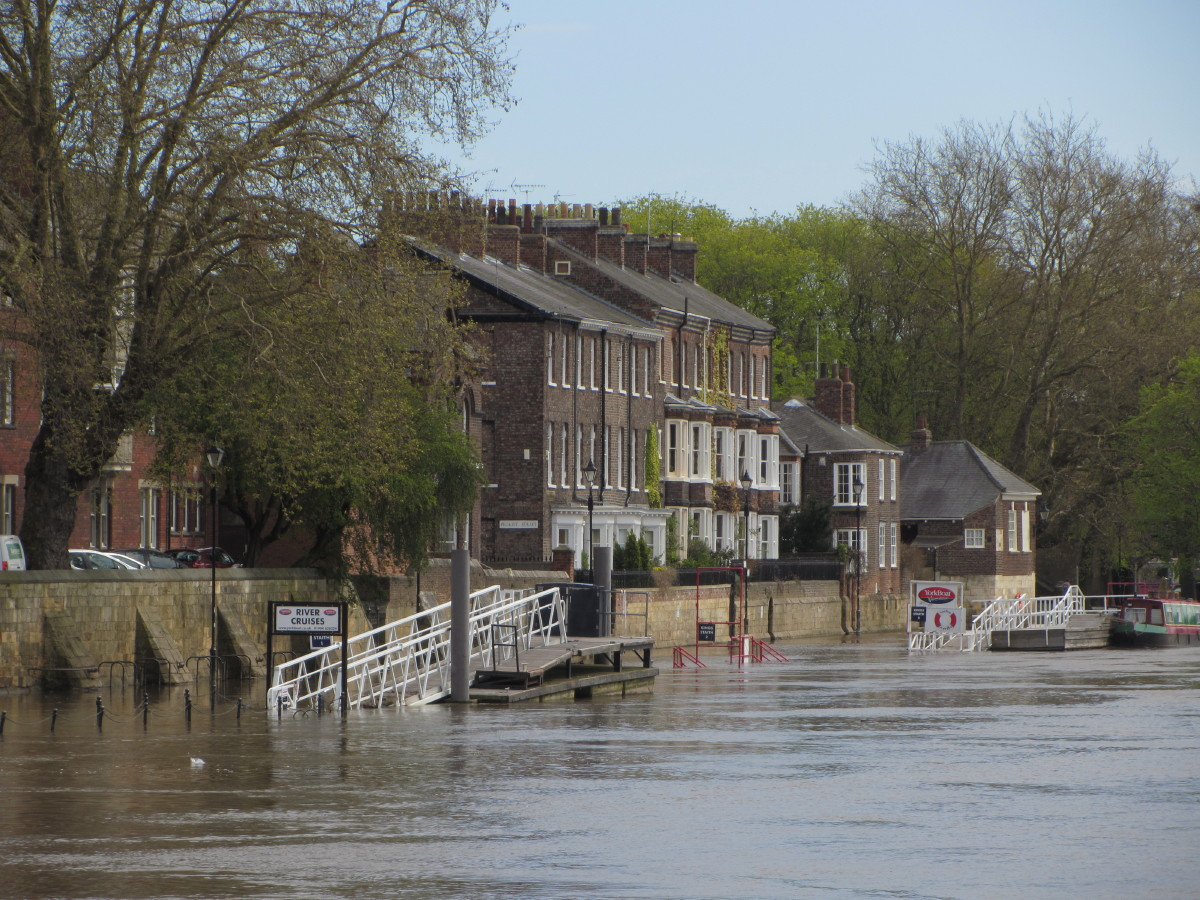
The friary wall

York Franciscan Friary was a friary in York, North Yorkshire, England. It was located between York Castle and the River Ouse. In 1538, it fell victim to Henry VIII's dissolution of the monasteries. All that now remains of it is a stone wall on King's Staith, adjacent to the Davy Tower on the York city walls.

== Burials ==
- Robert de Neville
- Thomas de Mowbray, 4th Earl of Norfolk
