= York Racecourse =

Racecourse in North Yorkshire, England

Coordinates: 53°56′19″N 1°5′51″W

York

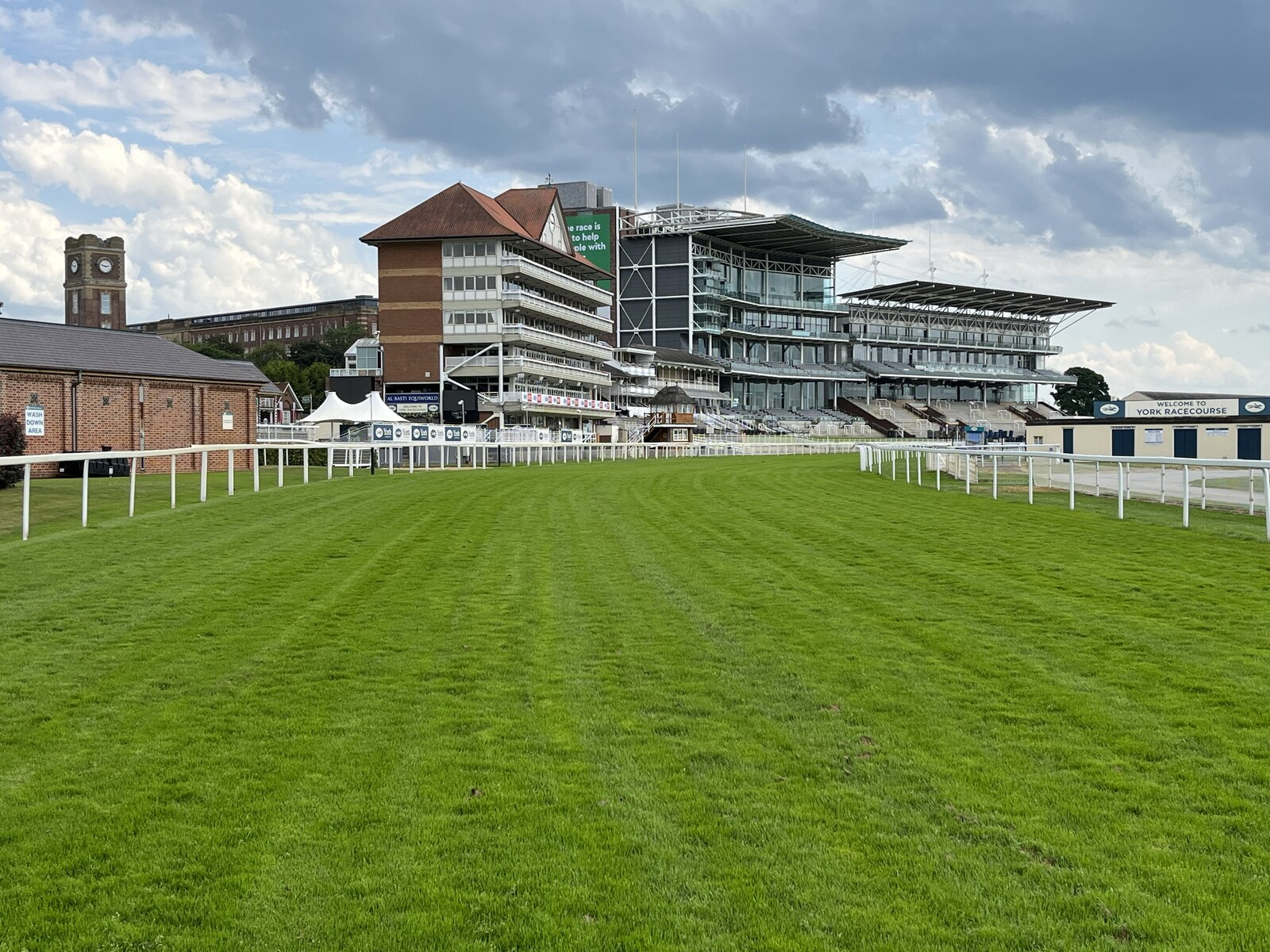
- The stands
- Interactive map of York
- Location: York, North Yorkshire
- Owned by: York Racecourse Knavesmire LLP
- Date opened: 1731
- Screened on: Racing TV
- Course type: Flat
- Notable races: Dante Stakes; International Stakes; Yorkshire Oaks; Nunthorpe Stakes; City of York Stakes; Ebor Handicap

York Racecourse is a horse racing venue in York, North Yorkshire, England. It is the third biggest racecourse in Britain in terms of total prize money offered, and second behind Ascot in prize money offered per meeting. It attracts around 360,000 racegoers per year and stages four of the UK's 38 annual Group 1 races – the Juddmonte International Stakes, the Nunthorpe Stakes, the Yorkshire Oaks and the City of York Stakes.

Racing is believed to have begun at the current site in 1731, although the history of racing in York goes back to the Roman era. The patronage of Charles Watson-Wentworth, 2nd Marquess of Rockingham led to great prosperity, with a grandstand designed by John Carr opened in 1754. The course saw some of the best horses of the 18th century but then faced a downturn in fortunes after public executions on the Knavesmire finished, although John Orton and R M Jaques turned the racecourse around during the 1840s. The course has since continuously been redeveloped and added to, although many historic structures, including some of Carr's grandstand, survive. The course served as a prisoner-of-war camp in World War II and has also deputised for other racecourses, including hosting Royal Ascot in 2005 and the 1945 and 2006 runnings of the St Leger Stakes. It has been visited by figures such as Pope John Paul II, Elizabeth II and many of the best racehorses of all time, including Frankel and Sea The Stars.

The course used to be a horseshoe in shape but is now a left-handed circuit of around two miles. The course is flat and generally considered to be fair. It was scheduled to host eighteen fixtures in 2026, including the four-day Ebor Festival and much other top-class racing. Concerts and other events are also regular fixtures at the venue.

== Location ==
The course is located in the southwest of the city, next to the former Terry's of York factory, The Chocolate Works. It is situated on an expanse of ground which has been known since pre-medieval times as the Knavesmire, from the Anglo-Saxon 'knave' meaning a man of low standing, and 'mire' meaning a swampy pasture for cattle. For this reason, the racecourse is still sometimes referred to as The Knavesmire. This area was originally common pasture, belonging to the city. It was also the scene of the hanging of Dick Turpin in 1739.

== History ==
=== The Roman era ===
Racing in York dates back to Roman times, with Arabian horses being sent to Eboracum to precede the arrival of Emperor Septimius Severus in 208 AD, providing entertainment for the troops sent to quell rebellion from the Caledonians. The events were well patronised by those of patrician rank, highly professional and very competitive, although it was more of a team sport than today; team managers hired or fired the riders for the teams they were responsible for. It is also likely that racing at this time took place near to the current site.

=== Before the Knavesmire ===
The city corporation is known to have given its support to the sport from 1530, when it took place in the Forest of Galtres. The Lord Mayor acted as custodian of a silver bell won that year by Oswald Wyllesthorpe. A famous yearly race for a golden bell was taking place in the nearby Forest of Galtres in 1590 and at this time it was customary to attach the bell to the winning horse's headgear then parade them in triumph. A receipt saying 'receaved the XXth day of March 1596, fortie five pounds, wone uppon your Lordship's hobbie of Mr Holmes, the Forest race of Galteresse the XXIst of Februarye' was found within the manuscripts of a Duke of Rutland.

In 1607, rather improvised racing is known to have taken place on the frozen River Ouse, between Micklegate Bar and Skeldergate Postern, during a bitterly cold winter. This was repeated in December 1608.

Charles I attended racing at York (at this time taking place on Acomb Moor) in 1633, meeting his friend Sir Henry Slingsby; Slingsby's horse would be victorious. He would be the last reigning monarch to attend racing at York until Elizabeth II in 1972, who came to view the inaugural Benson and Hedges Gold Cup.

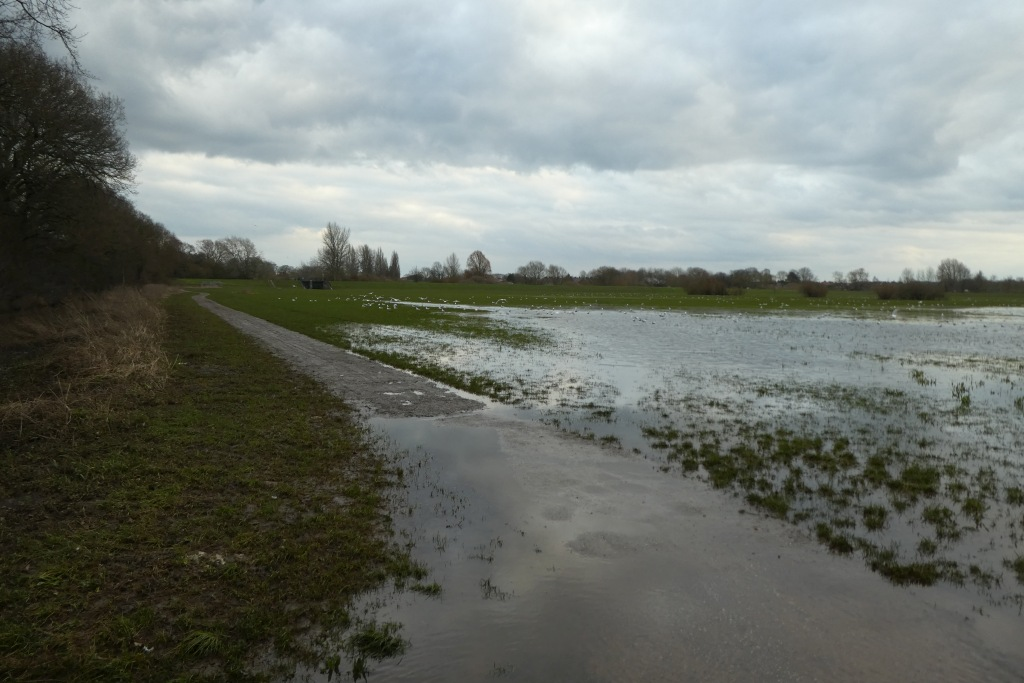
Clifton Ings

By the early 18th century, racing had moved to Clifton Ings, where records of a meeting exist from 1709. It seems efforts were made to establish this racecourse as a more professional venue, but these efforts were plagued by frequent flooding from the River Ouse. Queen Anne patronised the racecourse with a hundred-guinea gold cup in 1711, which was to be run for by six-year-olds in two four-mile heats and won by Sampson I. She would send her own horse for the following year's running (a gelding called Pepper) but was unsuccessful. It was on a raceday that many figures in the nobility heard of Anne's death in 1714, meaning that they rushed from the Ings to the city to hear the proclamation of King George I by the Archbishop of York. A horse of Anne's (named Star) had won a £40 plate at York, but she had died by the time the news reached London.

The course at Clifton Ings was well-attended, with it being said about a 1714 fixture that 'such was the concourse of nobility and gentry that attended York races that one hundred and fifty coaches were at one time on the course'. However, the flooding issues persisted, with the final straw coming in 1730. A flood meant that a meeting scheduled for a Wednesday was delayed to the Saturday. Despite all this, racing was still held in high regard, with Simon Scrope writing this in his diary that year:

Every year there be more noble lords, gentle dames, and commoners of high and low degree at York for the races,... all of one mind, looking on York as the place above all others for sport and sportsmen.

=== Move to the Knavesmire and growth ===
On 11 August 1731, racing began on the Knavesmire with the King's Guineas, won by a horse named Monkey. (Note: Orton's Turf Annals of York and Doncaster, which records the results of races at this time, has races taking place at 'Clifton and Rawcliffe Ings' in the period 1709 and 1731 which would support the official view. An earlier source also takes this stance, with a record published in York in 1771 describing races as having moved to the Knavesmire from 1731 onwards. However, Sheahan and Whellan, 19th century York historians, have racing taking place in both places in 1709 – 'a regular race meeting on Clifton Ings' and, in the same year, a collection taking place among the citizens to purchase five plates as prizes for a meeting on the Knavesmire. Drake's Eboracum, another early history, when talking of York's races says, 'Clifton-ings was for several years the place of trial; but upon a misunderstanding with the owner of that ground, or great part of it, the race was altered; and Knavesmire, a common pasture belonging to the city, was pitched upon for that purpose'. Since Drake was writing in 1736, it's perhaps unlikely that he would write in such a manner if the move to Knavesmire had been so recent. The Saunders & Co. History, using all these sources, concludes 'the races were held annually on both courses – at Clifton Ings previous to and for some years subsequent to the year 1709, and at Knavesmire at and from that date; and that most probably in or about the year 1731, the races were done away with at the former place and transferred to the latter.' However, more recent sources, notably Gill and Stevens' books discussing or featuring the course, give the date of racing beginning on the Knavesmire as 1731 and the two courses as having not coexisted.) This would be a six-day meeting on a horseshoe-shaped course that had been levelled and drained in preparation for racing. Alderman John Telford built arches and drains on the undrained bog and had the course make a very tight turn around the 'basin', which some jockeys came to regard as a dangerous configuration.

York was the first centre after Newmarket to formulate a structured race programme, starting in 1751 with the Great Subscription Purses. Race meetings were often timed to follow the August Assizes, with carriages taking people to watch the races having witnessed the executions that took place at the infamous 'Three-Legged Mare' adjacent to the course. Executions had begun at the site in 1379 but were brought to an end in 1801. Matchem won the 5yo Great Subscription Purse of 1753 hours after William Smith was hanged for murder.

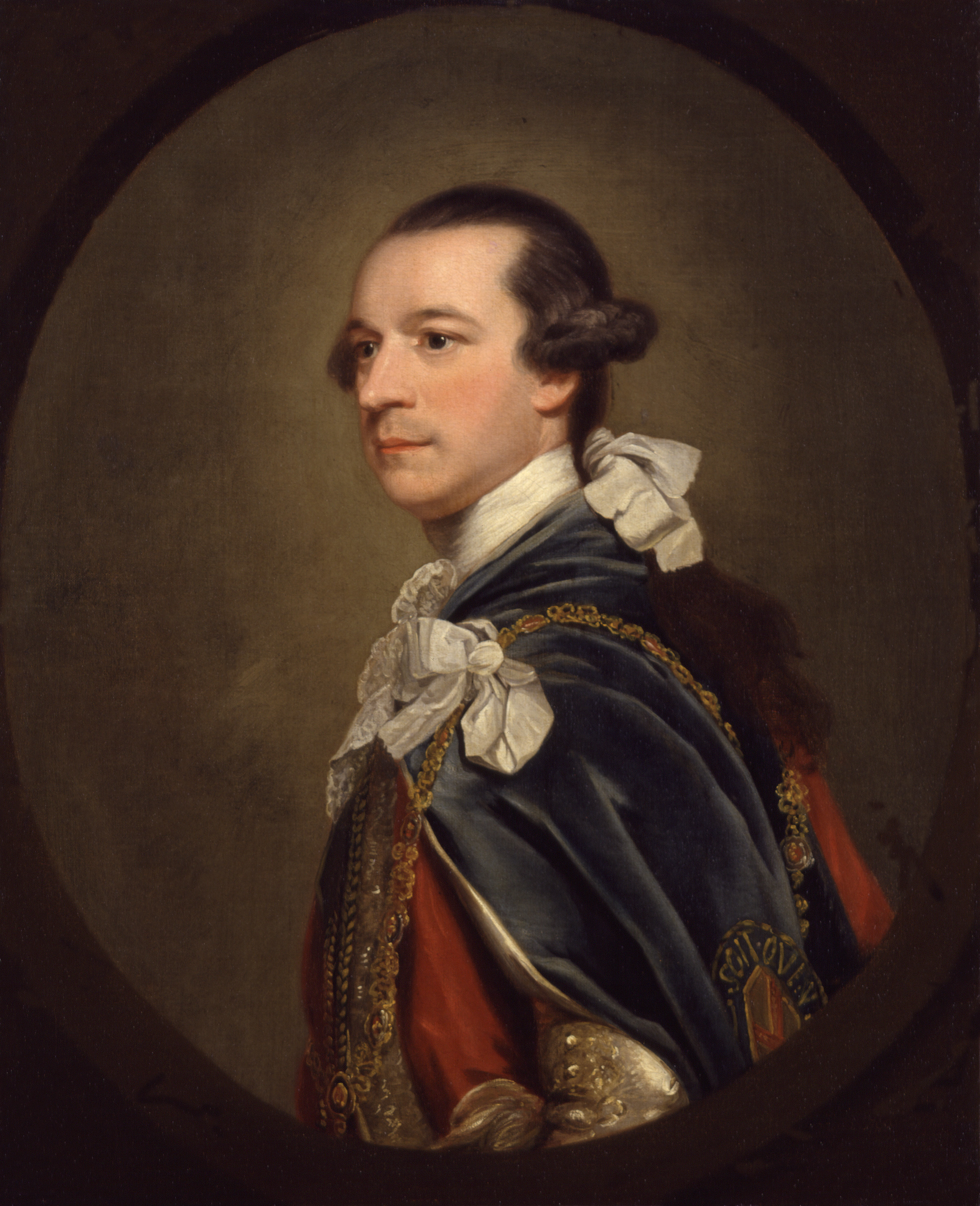
Lord Rockingham

The fortunes of the racecourse began to ascend further with the patronage of Charles Watson-Wentworth, 2nd Marquess of Rockingham of Wentworth Woodhouse, a member of the House of Lords from the age of twenty and an avid racing fan. Using his major political influence, he was patron of both the racing and evening assemblies which were held at the York Assembly Rooms. He was disappointed in the lack of amenities at the racecourse itself, which had no grandstand and thus meant that attendees watched from the centre of the horseshoe in their carriages. He therefore commissioned York architect John Carr to design a grandstand, funded by the sale of 250 five-guinea shares that entitled patrons and their successors to use the stand for the period of the site's lease. It was ready for the 1754 August meeting and has been said to have been the oldest grandstand (in the modern sense) at any sporting venue in the world. It was a two-storey building with a rooftop viewing platform; the ground floor featured a rusticated arcade leading into a hall whilst the first floor was filled entirely by a reception room, which had large arched windows and was encircled by a balcony. The first horse to win a race after the stand was complete was Whistlejacket, immortalised in a painting by George Stubbs.

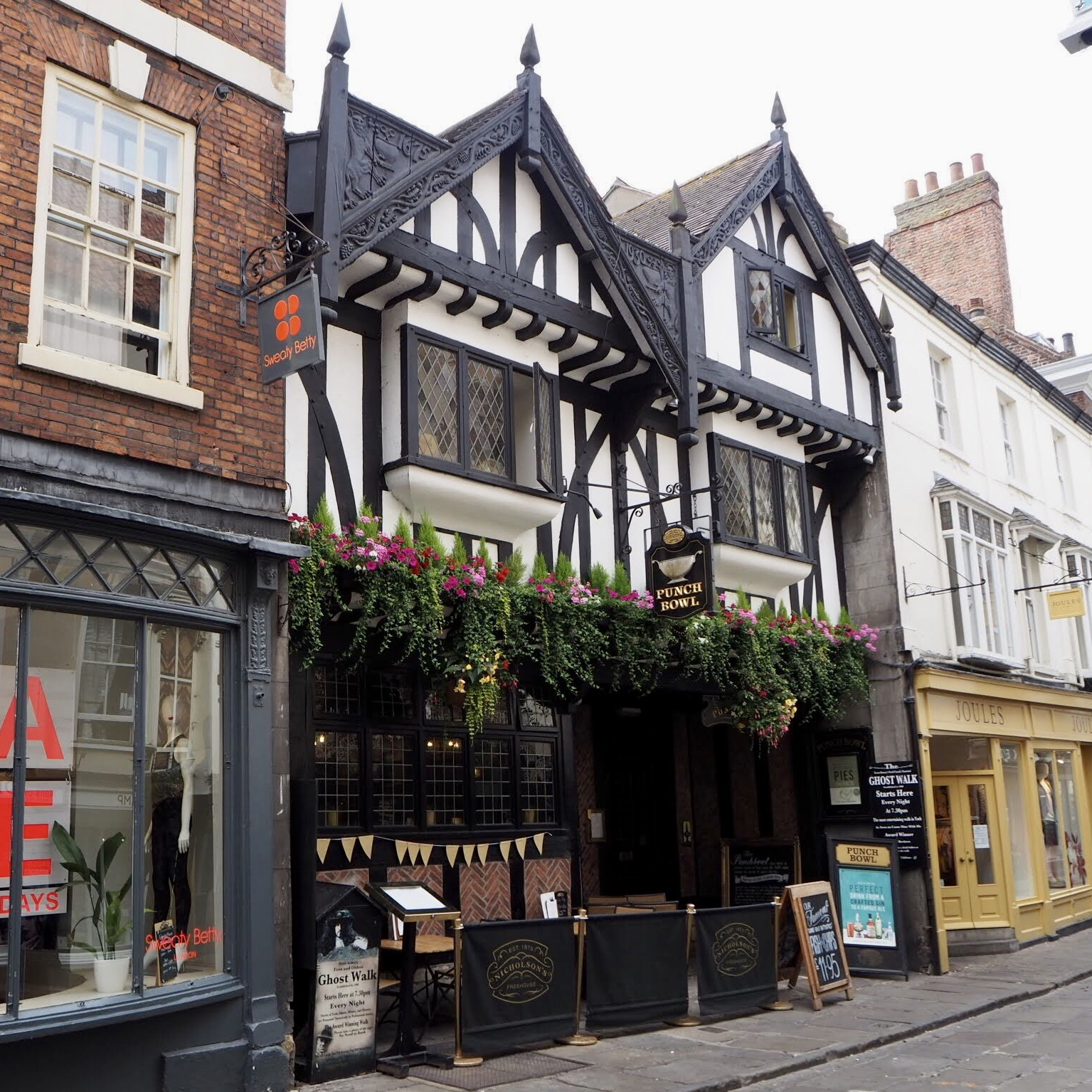
The Punch Bowl

In 1770, the Ancient Fraternitie of Ye Gimcracks (the Gimcrack Club) was formed, this being the first ever racing club in the world. It honoured the diminutive grey horse Gimcrack (a winner of 27 of his 35 races), despite the fact he didn't win either of his races at York. The annual dinners were initially held at The Punch Bowl on Stonegate and an annual Gimcrack Dinner is still held every December, with a speech traditionally given by the winning owner of the Gimcrack Stakes, first run in 1846.

The racecourse was attracting the most successful horses of the age, notably the never-beaten Eclipse. He walked over in His Majesty's 100 Guineas at York in August 1770, having frightened away all opposition, then beat only two rivals back on the Knavesmire three days later.

The Knavesmire course, as the name suggests, was often very swampy, and in 1776, heavy rains meant that horses had to race for about fifty yards up to their knees in water. Racing in the late 18th century also saw scandal, for example when Miss Nightingale (one of the leading mares of the time) had been poisoned and killed just before she was due to race by two pounds of duck-shot found in her stomach; a man named William Turner was charged but was acquitted due to a lack of evidence.

The racecourse would be visited by George, Prince of Wales and the Duke of York in 1789, with Samuel Chifney victorious on a horse named Traveller which was sold to the prince as a result of the success. However, Chifney would be accused of cheating at York in 1791 after two questionable rides, which began a fall from grace for the royal jockey. He returned to ride at York in 1800, but was seen as so untrustworthy that he was taken off a mount he had ridden to finish last the day before having been accused again of cheating.

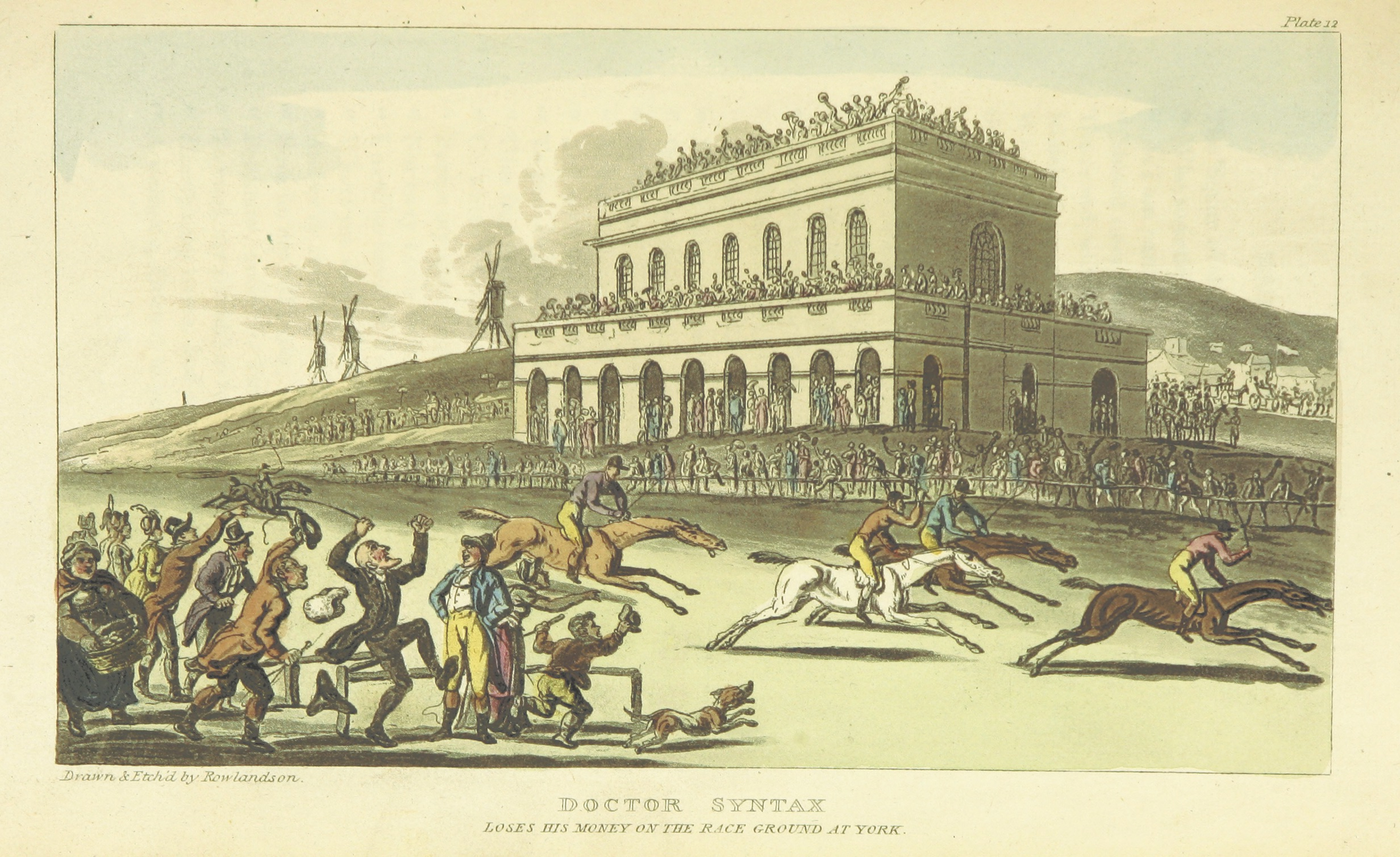
The course in 1813, including John Carr's grandstand

At the August meeting in 1804 Alicia Thornton, who as a result has been called the 'first female jockey', took part in a four-mile horse race at the course. However, she was unsuccessful as her horse, named Vinagrillio, broke down lame and had to be pulled up.

At the Peterloo Massacre of 1819, the local military commander General Sir John Byng was absent because he had two horses running at York that day, and delegated command to his deputy, who failed to peacefully disperse the large crowd, resulting in 18 deaths and hundreds of injuries.

=== Decline and revival ===
The end of public hangings at the Knavesmire in 1801 was likely a contributory factor in the decline of the fortunes of racing at York. By the 1820s, the race meeting was beginning to struggle and the quality of the racing declined. The Spring 1828 meeting was so uninspiring that many instead spectated and bet on the cockfighting (taking place near the Assembly Rooms) for their entertainment. The assemblies were also in decline, with improvements in transportation having reduced the need for rural landowners to keep York townhouses so August race week in the city was no longer the occasion it was. Many races were reduced to matches or even walkovers, and only eight horses were entered for a meeting on 16 May 1839. A new meeting organised by the Hunt Club in October 1835, with music provided by the 10th Royal Hussars, and the introduction of a new race (the Champagne Stakes), still wasn't enough. York risked being overtaken for prestige by Doncaster, which could boast the St Leger Stakes. One racegoer lamented that 'a more miserable affair than York August meeting it has never been my misfortune to attend - everything reached the climax of dullness. No company, bad sport and no betting'.

In 1842, John Orton was appointed clerk of the course by the new Race Committee formed that year, tasked with reviving York Racecourse's fortunes. Despite the personal hatred of Orton from the powerful Lord George Bentinck, Orton had much success, aided by money coming in. The City of York Council was also beginning to recognise a need to aid the racecourse further, with Orton having told them that they 'should not be satisfied with dealing us out in such short measure'. The Great Ebor Handicap was first run in 1843 over two miles for £200, beginning a major revival of the course's fortunes. All wooden buildings were taken down and replaced by brick, the track was made a circle (although it would revert to a shepherd's crook shape for much of the 20th century), a five-furlong straight was made and the Ebor was reduced to 1¾m.

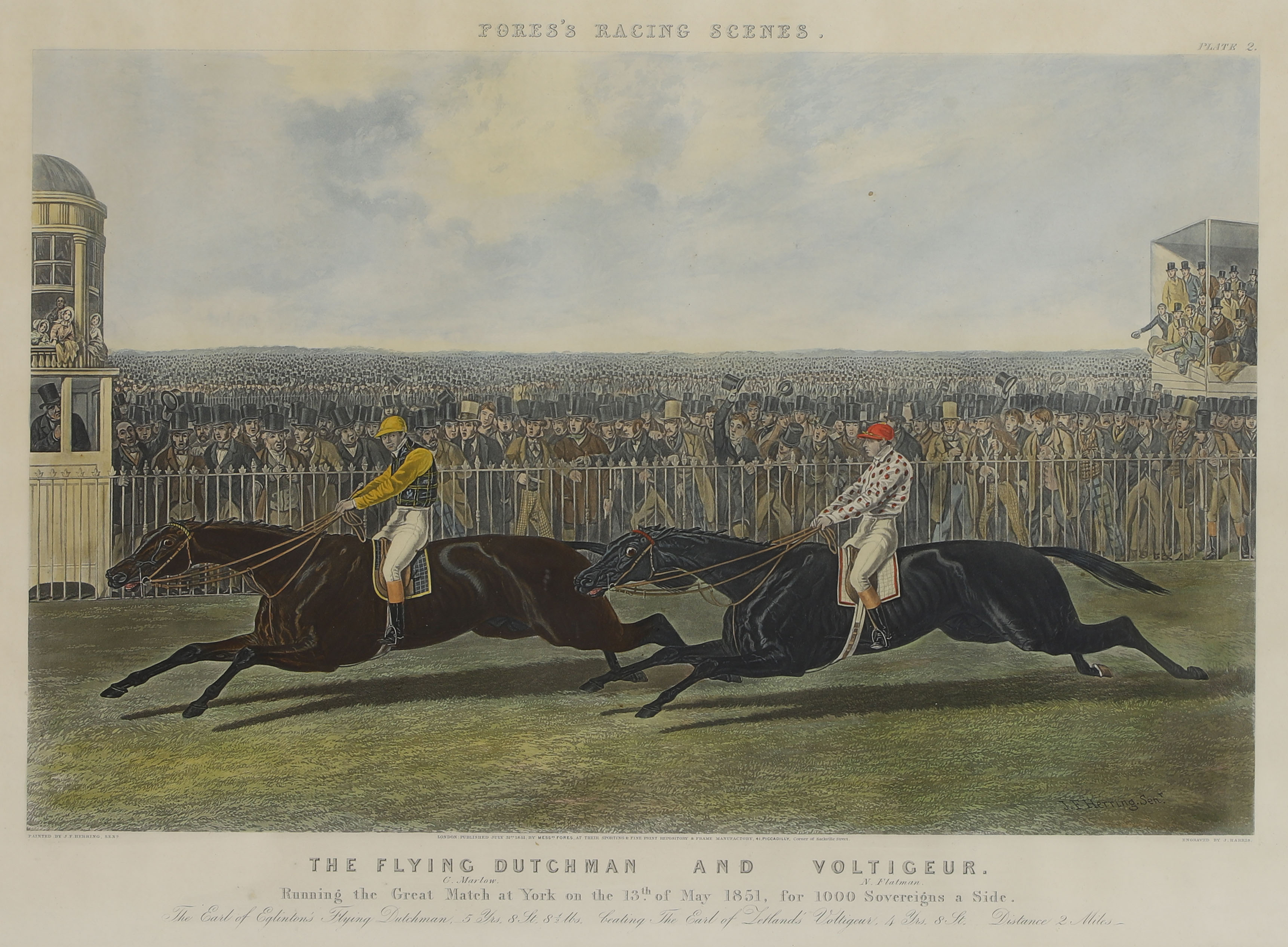
The Great Match

Orton, hounded by Bentinck, was forced out in 1846 by the pressured Race Committee and would soon die from alcohol abuse. R M Jaques, appointed clerk of the course in 1843, replaced him in charge and introduced the Gimcrack Stakes that year. Efforts were also made to combat cheating including substitution of horses, with it being announced by the stewards that no horse would be allowed to race at York unless a vet had examined its mouth.

York Racecourse was now restored to its rightful status, the revival culminating in The Great Match of 1851. It was dubbed the 'race of the century' and saw Derby winners The Flying Dutchman (carrying 8st 8lbs) and Voltigeur (carrying 8st) battle it out over two miles. The crowd was estimated at around 150,000, a record for York still standing today, and one witness described the race:

When the flag fell Voltigeur went off with the running at the top of his pace, taking a lead of at least 3 lengths, and making very severe play, the heavy state of the ground being taken into account. In this way they rounded the last turn, when Marlow called on the Dutchman with a request very pointedly urged. As they passed the stand it was stride for stride, and a struggle of desperate effort. It was too much for the young one - he tired the sooner: and The Flying Dutchman passed the winning-chair first by a short-length.

Voltigeur would return to York and be victorious in the Flying Dutchman Handicap of 1852, in what turned out to be his final race. He is honoured at York with the Great Voltigeur Stakes, first run in 1950.

Developments continued apace in the 1850s, with a new Stewards' Stand built in 1851 only to be replaced by another on the north side of the grandstand two years later.

National Hunt racing began at York in 1858, although it only lasted until 1885 and has not returned.

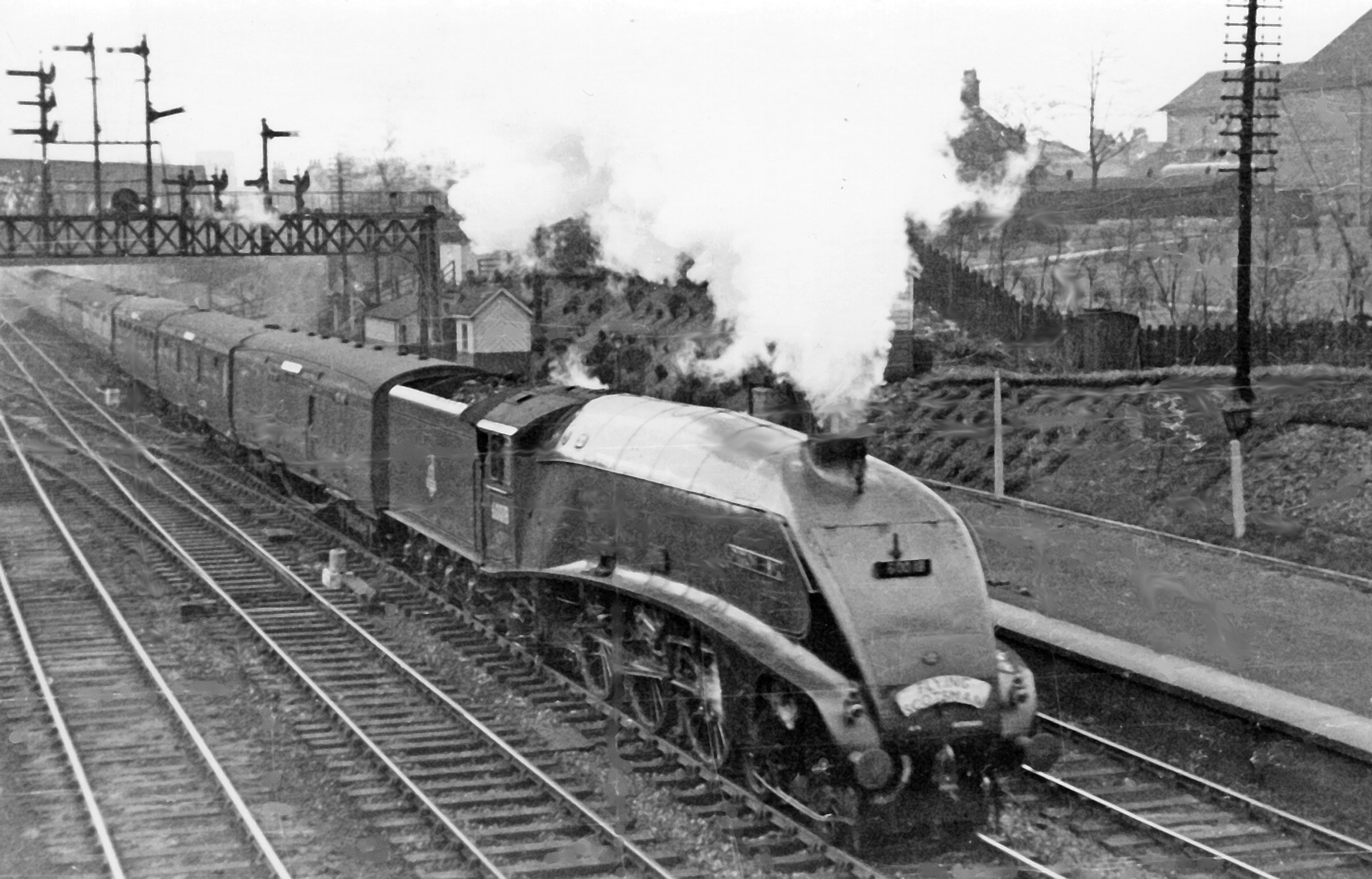
The station site in 1950, a decade after its closure

The course was served by its own railway station, which only opened on racedays, from 1860. It was located next to Holgate Bridge and closed after August 1939, although the course is still easy to reach from the main railway station by foot or shuttle bus.

In December 1865, the Race Committee decided to build 'a new Stewards’ Stand with private boxes, retiring rooms, and other accommodation for the use of the stewards and other subscribers to the stand'. Over the following two years, the 1853 Stewards’ Stand was removed and replaced with what is now the Gimcrack Stand. A saddling paddock and weighing room was built in 1875, and this is now the Press Stand. The 'Opera Boxes' in between are an early 20th century infill.

By 1880, a small polygonal stewards’ stand had been erected between the County and Press Stands and around 1884 the Half Crown Stand was built south of the grandstand. John Carr's grandstand would be redeveloped in 1890, with only the ground floor arcade being retained; two new storeys of seating supported by ornamental iron columns were added and the stand was capable of seating 2,000 racegoers. The ground floor is still in use today, having been moved eastwards and rebuilt in the early 1900s. It now serves as a bar, terrace and grill adjacent to the parade ring.

=== New lease and wartime ===
The racecourse had faced closure in 1902 when the Race Committee's annual lease from the Corporation ran out. The Race Committee didn't want the course to fall under municipal control as it had at Doncaster whilst the pasture-masters, with entrenched rights on the Knavesmire, were trying to extract as much rent from the Committee as possible. Although other venues for racing were considered, negotiations were successful and an Act of Parliament extinguished the rights of the pasture-masters and thus saved racing at York; a thirty-five year lease was given by the Corporation and this allowed greater development.

The development that followed the 1907 lease extension was led by Walter Brierley, Yorkshire’s most prominent architect. From 1907 to 1913 he led improvement projects that included extensions to the 1867 County Stand and the 1875 Press Stand, and new crown and half-crown stands. Between 1907 and 1909, the property line of the north end of the racecourse was expanded, allowing the creation of a new boundary wall, entrance gates, bars and a replacement weighing room.

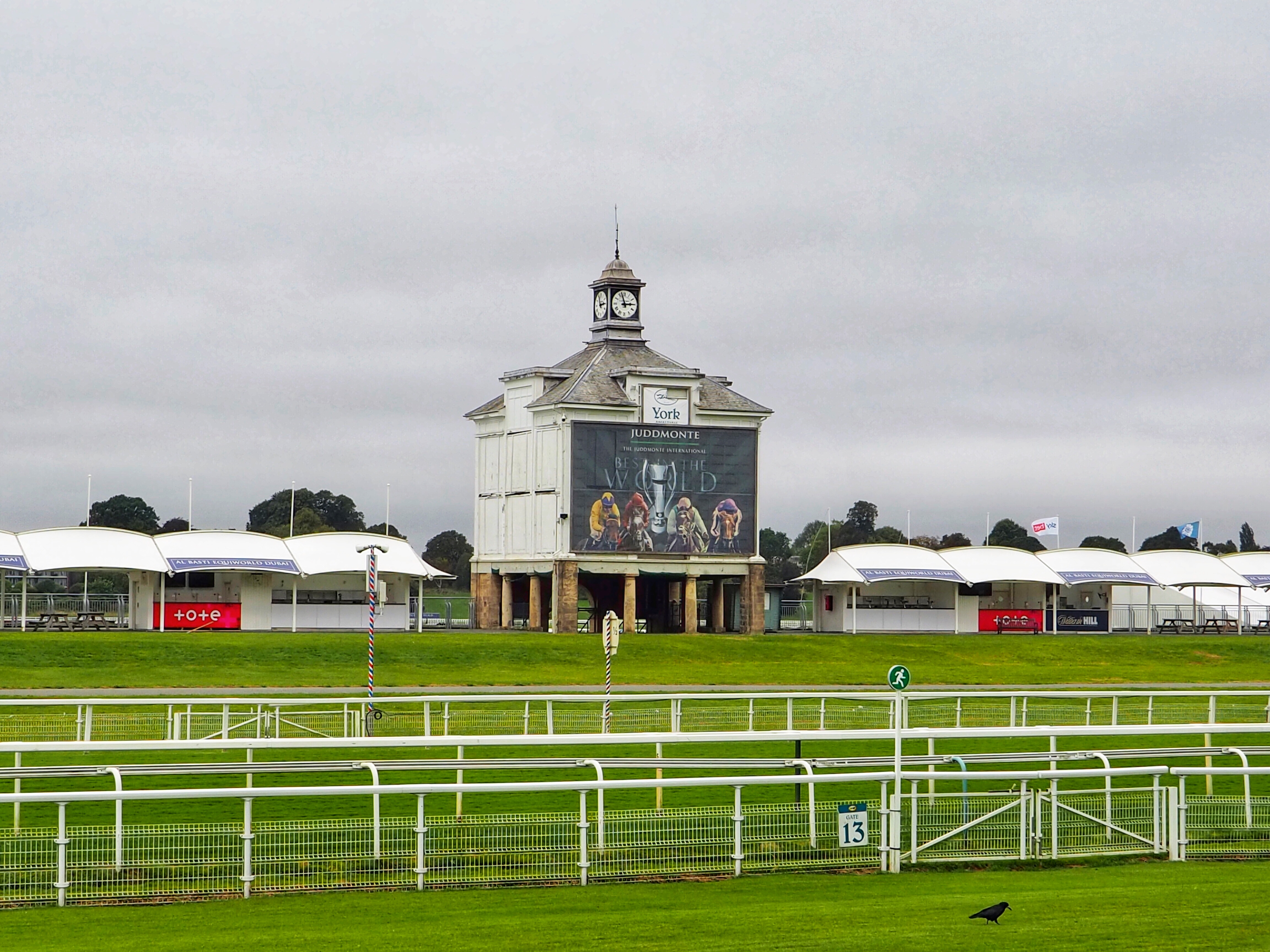
The 1920s Tote board, which is the namesake for the Clocktower Enclosure

During the Second World War, the racecourse served as a prisoner-of-war camp, with huts constructed in the centre of the horseshoe near the Tote board which was built in 1922 and designed by Brierley. The Knavesmire was used to grow grain, potatoes, corn and sugar beet. Just after the war ended, the course was able to host the Victory St Leger, with the usual venue of Doncaster still not able to host due to unsuitable conditions.

=== Post-war history ===
After the war, Major Leslie Petch spearheaded further improvements to the course, first as clerk of the course then as manager. A new stand to the north of the Press Stand was built in 1957 but all that had gone before would be dwarfed by the five-tier grandstand opened in 1965, which offered an excellent view of the course. A straight seven-furlong course had also been added but this would soon disappear at the end of 1973 due to the building of the A64, replaced by a dogleg chute. In 1962, the course was successful in obtaining a lease that lasts until 2056, securing the racecourse's future.

The course continued to emphasise quality and attempt to improve further, with Petch visiting courses like Longchamp and Santa Anita to obtain new ideas. The quality of food being offered in the premier enclosures was becoming of a very high calibre with a vast array of food required for one 1960s Ebor meeting: 400 grouse, 350 chickens, 100 Norfolk ducklings, 500 lbs of Scotch salmon, 500 dover sole, 400 lobster, 150 lbs of smoked salmon and vast amounts of beef, pork and lamb.

The quality of the racing improved with the International Stakes, first run in 1972. The inaugural running saw Roberto beat Brigadier Gerard, with both horses breaking the course record. The prize money across the year by 1975 was worth almost £300,000, a figure only exceeded at the time by Ascot and Newmarket. The course also had a racing museum at this time.

Disaster befell Willie Carson during the 1981 Ebor meeting, when his mount Silken Knot in the Yorkshire Oaks broke two legs and fell. Five horses would trample over the fallen partnership and Carson escaped death by a fraction. However, he had broken parts of his spine and his left wrist and had a fracture at the bottom of his skull. Silken Knot was put down.

On 31 May 1982, Pope John Paul II visited the racecourse and drew a reported audience of 190,000. Some had turned up at midnight to get a good position to hear the Pope's speech, which celebrated marriage and family life.

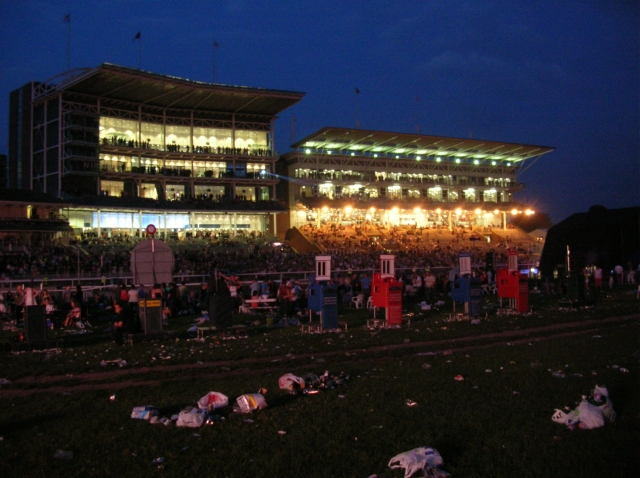
An after-racing music concert in 2008

On 22 September 1984, the racecourse hosted its first music concert, headlined by Echo & the Bunnymen. In recent years, concerts have been arranged after race meetings in May, June and July and from 2015 to 2017, it hosted the Yorfest.

Anne, Princess Royal would ride a winner at the racecourse in 1988, being successful in the Queen Mother's Cup (a race for female amateur jockeys) on a horse named Insular.

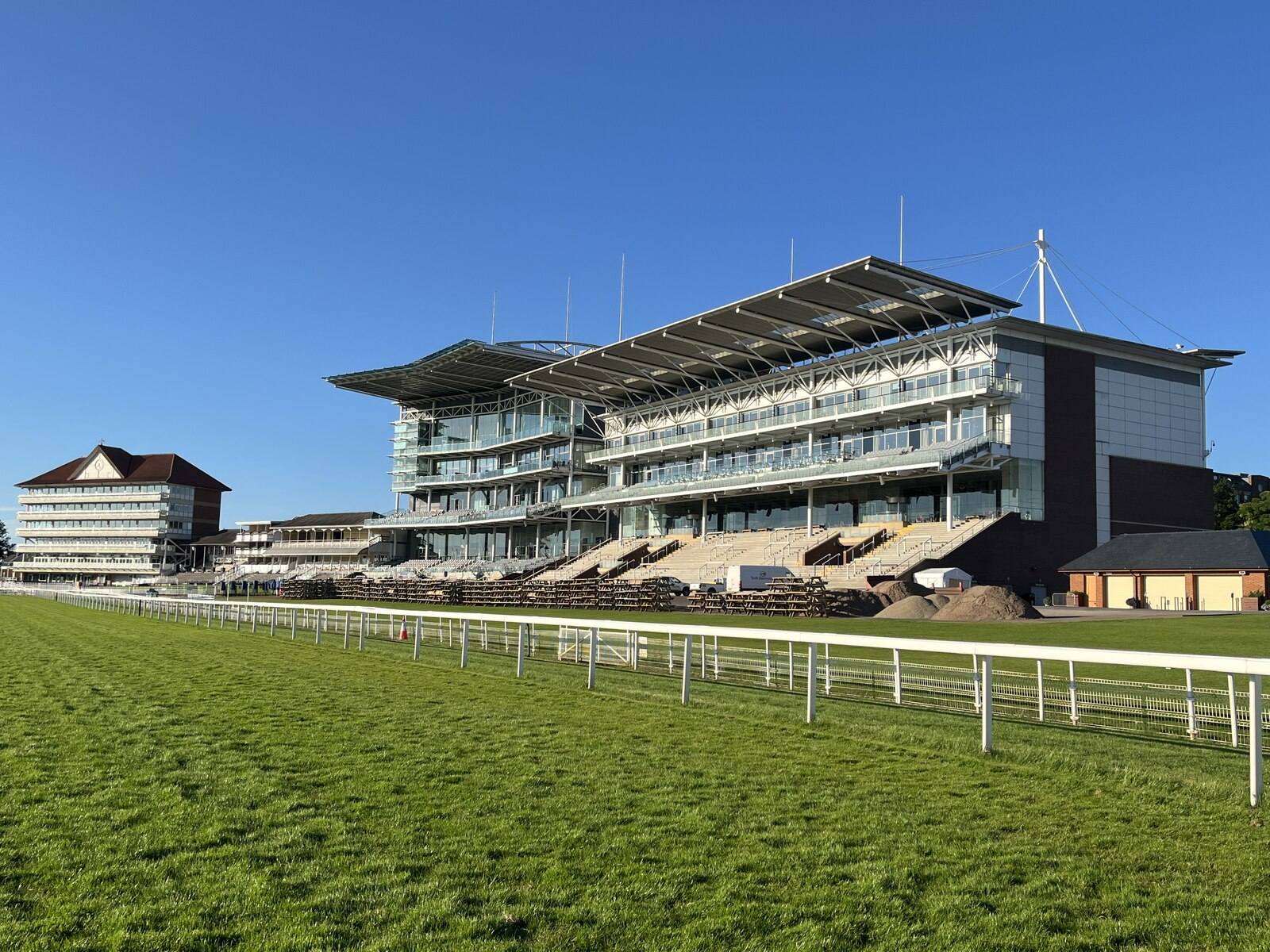
The stands today. The Melrose Stand is the furthest away and the Ebor and Knavesmire stands are the two tallest ones (the Knavesmire being rightmost)

Redevelopment remained a regular theme, with the Melrose Stand opening in 1989 followed by the Knavesmire Stand in 1997. In 2003, the 1965 Stand would be replaced with the Ebor Stand, built at a cost of £12mn.

The course hosted its first ever Sunday race meeting in 2000, which was a success and attracted a 22,500-strong crowd. This would be followed by the first evening meeting in 2006.

In 2005, Royal Ascot was staged at York due to a £185mn redevelopment at its usual home. This meant that the course was reconfigured to be a complete circuit to facilitate the running of races longer than two miles (notably the Ascot Gold Cup). An attendance of over 224,000 over the five days was attracted, with around 50,000 attending Ladies' Day on the Thursday.

York hosted the St Leger in 2006, when Doncaster underwent its own redevelopment.

The 2008 Ebor Festival (which would have been the first in modern times to be over four days, with a Friday added to the Tuesday-Thursday meeting) had to be cancelled due to wet conditions making the course waterlogged. Some races were rescheduled to Newbury, Newmarket and Goodwood but many were lost.

During the 2012 London Olympics, the torch visited the racecourse on Day 32 of its relay, with a cauldron being lit by showjumper Harvey Smith after he carried the torch on a horse. The second stage of the 2014 Tour de France started from the racecourse.

In 2015, further redevelopment at the racecourse was completed. A new weighing room was built with the Parade Ring Restaurant on the first floor as the centrepiece of a £5mn development. This also included the relocation of the pre-parade ring, redevelopment of the old pre-parade ring into a raised hospitality lawn, creation of an adjoining champagne bar with rooftop terrace and restoration of the John Carr Stand.

A new development was opened in 2024, renovating the 1913 Bustardthorpe Stand, originally designed by Walter Brierley. The Roberto Pavilion was built, providing food and betting facilities, and a 900m² lawn and canopy was made behind the stand. The development included a living roof, rainwater harvesting, pollinator flowerbeds and solar panels, part of York Racecourse's commitment to Green Knavesmire 300 (a key part of which is net-zero emissions by 2040). Queen Camilla would open the new development at the 2024 Ebor meeting.

== Course characteristics ==
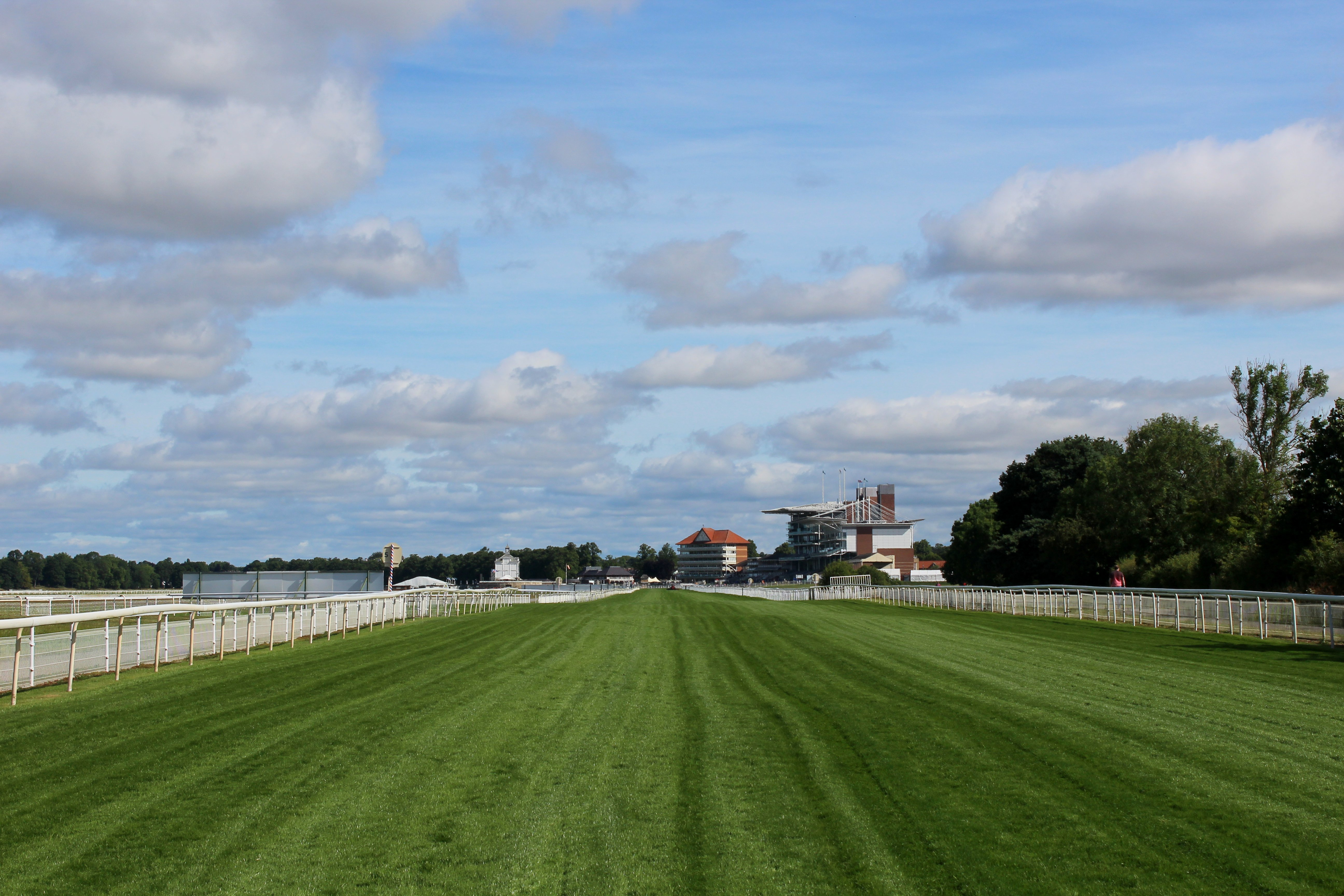
Looking down the home straight

In the 18th century the racecourse was horseshoe in shape and was 'judged to be the best race[course] in England for seeing the diversion'. The track is a left-handed circuit of around two miles, having been a horseshoe until 2005 when the north bend was added to enable hosting of the staying races of Royal Ascot, moved to York that year. The old two-mile start is now defunct with that chute shortened by two furlongs, and races over that distance now use the sweeping bend into the back straight and start in front of the stands. There is a straight six-furlong course and a chute for 7f races, with that chute having a left-handed elbow into the home straight. The course is very flat with sweeping bends and ideal for a long-striding galloper. Horses must be able to get the trip or are almost without a chance. It has been said to provide 'an essentially fair test of the thoroughbred'.

The course at York can become very testing, and abandonments due to waterlogging are not unknown even though racing only takes place from May to October. Flooding has often affected the Knavesmire, including in 2021 and 2024.

There is a slight draw bias towards the inside stalls on round course races up to 1m4f, which is increased on faster ground, whilst low draws also appear to be increasingly favoured in straight-course races.

== Enclosures ==
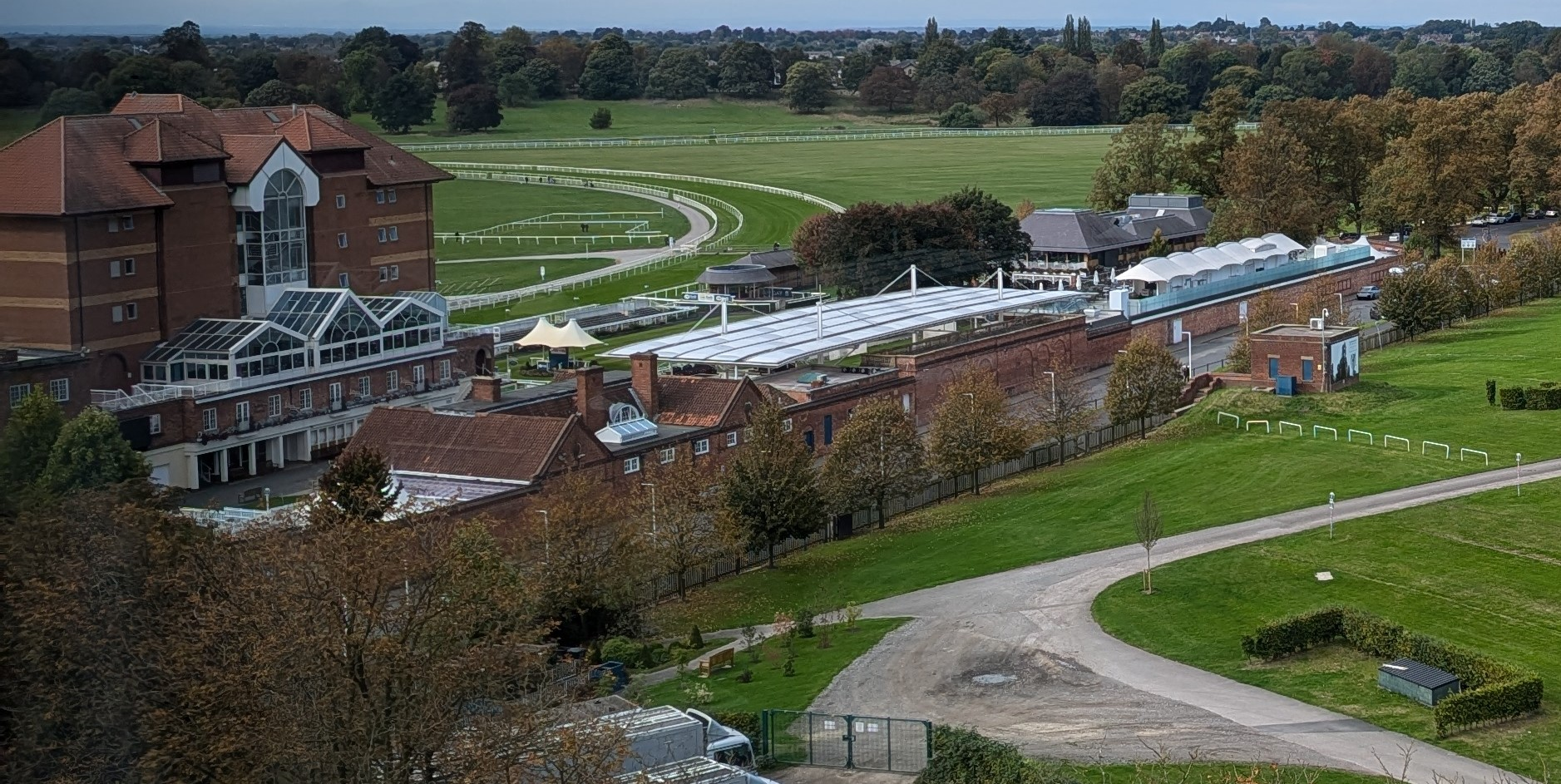
The racecourse buildings, seen from the southeast

The most expensive and stylish enclosure is the County Stand, which is the only one with a dress code; men must wear a jacket, collared shirt and tie and women must wear 'elegant attire'. It has its own viewing lawns along with many exclusive eateries and facilities, including the John Carr Stand and Edwardian Weighing Room. The Ebor, Gimcrack and Melrose Stands are all within this area. Anyone in this enclosure can access the other two enclosures.

The Grandstand & Paddock Enclosure is the largest enclosure and includes the parade ring, pre-parade ring and betting ring. It also features the Knavesmire and Bustardthorpe Stands and many eateries, along with access to the Clocktower Enclosure.

The Clocktower Enclosure is the cheapest of the three but spectators in it are restricted to the inside of the course, and are unable to cross to the stands and paddock areas. However, a grass bank provides a view of the home straight and eateries, bars and bookmakers are still available. Picnics are also permitted, unlike in the other two enclosures, and the atmosphere is more relaxed.

Many more high-end options are available, including restaurants, lounges and hospitality boxes.

== Awards ==
The track has won the Racegoers Club Racecourse of the Year title nine times, including in 1997, 2003, 2016, 2017 and 2018. The Racehorse Owners Association ranked York as the best racecourse in its Racecourse Accreditation in 2022, 2024 and 2025.

== Notable meetings and races ==
York's most important meeting is the Ebor Festival held annually in August, featuring the Ebor Handicap, Europe's richest flat handicap race as of 2026. The Ebor Festival also includes four Group 1 races: the Juddmonte International Stakes, the Yorkshire Oaks, the Nunthorpe Stakes and the City of York Stakes. The Juddmonte International was deemed the World's Best Horse Race by the International Federation of Horseracing Authorities in 2012, 2020 and 2024.

Month	Meeting	DOW	Race Name	Grade	Distance	Age/Sex
May	Dante Festival	Wednesday	Minster Stakes	Group 2	6f	3yo+
May	Dante Festival	Wednesday	Musidora Stakes	Group 3	1m 2f 56y	3yo f
May	Dante Festival	Thursday	Hambleton Handicap	Handicap	7f 192y	4yo+
May	Dante Festival	Thursday	Middleton Stakes	Group 2	1m 2f 56y	4yo+ f
May	Dante Festival	Thursday	Dante Stakes	Group 2	1m 2f 56y	3yo
May	Dante Festival	Thursday	Westow Stakes	Listed	5f	3yo
May	Dante Festival	Friday	Michael Seely Memorial Stakes	Listed	7f 192y	3yo f
May	Dante Festival	Friday	Marygate Fillies' Stakes	Listed	5f	2yo f
May	Dante Festival	Friday	Yorkshire Cup	Group 2	1m 5f 188y	4yo+
May	First Saturday	Saturday	Brontë Cup	Group 3	1m 5f 188y	4yo+ f&m
June	First June	Saturday	Grand Cup	Listed	1m 5f 188y	4yo+
June	First June	Saturday	Macmillan Sprint	Handicap	6f	3yo
June	Second June	Saturday	Criterion Stakes	Group 3	7f	3yo+
July	First July	Friday	Summer Stakes	Group 3	6f	3yo+ f
July	First July	Saturday	City Walls Stakes	Listed	5f	3yo+
July	First July	Saturday	John Smith's Cup	Heritage Handicap	1m 2f 56y	3yo+
July	First July	Saturday	John Smith's Silver Cup Stakes	Group 3	1m 5f 188y	4yo+
July	Second July	Friday	Lyric Stakes	Listed	1m 2f 56y	3yo+
July	Second July	Saturday	Sky Bet Dash	Heritage Handicap	6f	3yo+
July	Second July	Saturday	York Stakes	Group 2	1m 2f 56y	3yo+
August	Ebor Festival	Wednesday	Hong Kong Jockey Club World Pool Handicap	Heritage Handicap	5f 89y	3yo+
August	Ebor Festival	Wednesday	Acomb Stakes	Group 3	7f	2yo
August	Ebor Festival	Wednesday	Great Voltigeur Stakes	Group 2	1m 3f 188y	3yo
August	Ebor Festival	Wednesday	Juddmonte International	Group 1	1m 2f 56y	3yo+
August	Ebor Festival	Wednesday	Sky Bet Stayers Handicap	Heritage Handicap	2m 56y	3yo+
August	Ebor Festival	Wednesday	IRE-Incentive, It Pays To Buy Irish Fillies' Handicap	Heritage Handicap	5f	3yo+ f
August	Ebor Festival	Wednesday	Sky Bet Nursery Handicap	Handicap	6f	2yo
August	Ebor Festival	Thursday	Lowther Stakes	Group 2	6f	2yo f
August	Ebor Festival	Thursday	Harry's Half Million	Sales	6f	2yo
August	Ebor Festival	Thursday	Sky Bet Festival Handicap	Heritage Handicap	7f 192y	3yo+
August	Ebor Festival	Thursday	Yorkshire Oaks	Group 1	1m 3f 188y	3yo+ f
August	Ebor Festival	Thursday	Galtres Stakes	Listed	1m 3f 188y	3yo+ f
August	Ebor Festival	Thursday	Mews Hotel Ossett EBF Stallions Nursery Handicap	Handicap	7f	2yo
August	Ebor Festival	Thursday	British EBF Fillies' Handicap	Heritage Handicap	7f	3yo+ f
August	Ebor Festival	Friday	Sky Bet Mile	Heritage Handicap	7f 192y	3yo
August	Ebor Festival	Friday	Lonsdale Cup	Group 2	2m 56y	3yo+
August	Ebor Festival	Friday	Gimcrack Stakes	Group 2	6f	2yo
August	Ebor Festival	Friday	Nunthorpe Stakes	Group 1	5f	2yo+
August	Ebor Festival	Friday	Assured Data Protection Handicap	Heritage Handicap	1m 3f 188y	3yo+
August	Ebor Festival	Friday	Convivial Maiden	Maiden	7f	2yo
August	Ebor Festival	Friday	Sky Bet EBF Fillies' Handicap	Heritage Handicap	1m 2f 56y	3yo+ f
August	Ebor Festival	Saturday	Strensall Stakes	Group 3	1m 177y	3yo+
August	Ebor Festival	Saturday	Melrose Handicap	Heritage Handicap	1m 5f 188y	3yo
August	Ebor Festival	Saturday	City of York Stakes	Group 1	7f	3yo+
August	Ebor Festival	Saturday	Ebor Handicap	Heritage Handicap	1m 5f 188y	3yo+
August	Ebor Festival	Saturday	Constantine Handicap	Heritage Handicap	6f	3yo+
August	Ebor Festival	Saturday	Roses Stakes	Listed	5f	2yo
August	Ebor Festival	Saturday	Sky Bet Finale Handicap	Heritage Handicap	1m 2f 56y	3yo+
September	September	Sunday	Garrowby Stakes	Listed	6f	3yo+
October	October	Friday	British EBF £100,000 Final	Conditions	7f	2yo c&g
October	October	Saturday	Rockingham Stakes	Listed	6f	2yo
October	October	Saturday	Coral Sprint Trophy	Heritage Handicap	6f	3yo+

== Bibliography ==
- Camden, William (1722). Britannia: or A Chorographical Description of Great Britain and Ireland, Together with the Adjacent Islands (2nd ed.). London: Awnsham Churchill.
- Drake, Francis (1736). Eboracum: or, the history and antiquities of the City of York. London: William Bowyer.
- Fairfax-Blakeborough, John (1950). Northern Turf History Vol. III: York and Doncaster Races. London: J. A. Allen & Co.
- Gill, James (1975). Racecourses of Great Britain. London: Barrie & Jenkins. ISBN 0-2142-0090-6.
- York Races: Being an Historical List of All the Plates and Prizes Run for On Clifton and Rawcliffe Ings, and Since Removed to Knavesmire, Near the Said City; Likewise how the Mares came in every Year at Black Hambleton, Including the Year 1770. Petergate, York: J. Jackson. 1771.
- Mortimer, Roger (1971). The Encyclopaedia of Flat Racing. London: Robert Hale. ISBN 0-7091-1531-8.
- Mortimer, Roger; Onslow, Richard; Willett, Peter (1978). Biographical Encyclopaedia of British Flat Racing. London: Macdonald and Jane's. ISBN 0-354-08536-0.
- Roberts, Paul; Taylor, Isabelle (2013). Racecourse Architecture. Acanthus Press. ISBN 9780926494831.
- Horse-Racing: Its History and Early Records of the Principal and other Race Meetings with Anecdotes etc. London: Saunders, Otley & Co. 1863.
- Sheahan, J. J.; Whellan, T. (1855). History and Topography of the City of York; the Ainsty Wapentake; and the East Riding of Yorkshire. Vol. 1. Beverley: John Green.
- Stevens, John (1984). Knavesmire. London: Pelham Books Ltd. ISBN 0-7207-1508-3.
- Ward, Andrew (2017). Horse Racing's Strangest Tales. London: Portico. ISBN 978-1-911042-46-4.
- West, Julian, ed. (2000). Travelling The Turf. Hexham, Northumberland: Kensington West. ISBN 9781902990002.
- Whyte, James Christie (1840). History of the British Turf, from the earliest period to the present day. Vol. 1. London: H. Colburn. OL 6544990M.
