= The Great Match (horse race) =

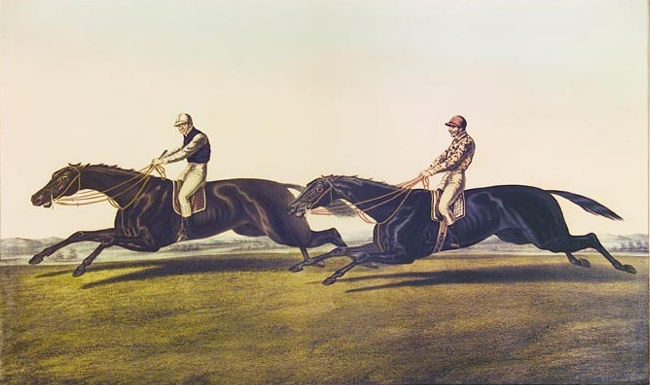
The Great Match by J F Herring: "Volti" is beaten by "The Flyer"

The Great Match is the name given to a match race between two of the most famous British Thoroughbred racehorses of the 19th century - Voltigeur and The Flying Dutchman. The race took place at York on 13 May 1851 for a purse of 1,000 sovereigns.

== Background ==
The Flying Dutchman was a 5-year-old, who had won the 1849 Epsom Derby and St Leger and, as a 4-year-old, the 1850 Ascot Gold Cup. So dominant had he been that the whip had only been raised on him on one occasion in his entire career - at Epsom.

Voltigeur was a year younger, and in 1850 had followed The Flying Dutchman's by taking both The Derby and St Leger (in a rematch after an initial dead heat). In winning the Derby, he had posted a time ten seconds faster than that of The Flying Dutchman the year previously.

Two days after Voltigeur's St Leger victory, the two horses met for the first time in the Doncaster Cup. The younger horse was in receipt of 19 pounds from his rival and as a result, the previously unbeaten Flying Dutchman went down to a half-length defeat, although in some ways the victory was deemed unsatisfactory. Rumours abounded that the Flying Dutchman's jockey, Charles Marlow, was the worse for drink and consequently ignored instructions to wait on the colt, declaring "I'll show you what I've got under me today!" and setting a ridiculously fast pace.

It was subsequently agreed that the two would meet again the following spring for a purse of 2,000 guineas, with each owner putting up half the stake.

== Race ==
The famous handicapper Henry John Rous set the weights for the second match, giving The Flying Dutchman a weight of 120½ pounds to Voltigeur's 112.

The race between the two Yorkshire horses proved extremely popular, drawing a crowd of between 100,000 and 150,000, an all-time record for York. Some even walked from as far afield as Richmond, North Yorkshire to be there.

Even the horses' exercise gallops attracted large crowds of fans attempting to assess their relative condition.

Unlike their previous meeting, The Flying Dutchman was successfully restrained in the early stages as Voltigeur, under Nat Flatman, made the running. In the final furlong the Flying Dutchman moved up level with his rival and then pulled ahead to win by a length.

== Aftermath ==
The event was immortalised in paintings by Harry Hall, first exhibited in Buchanan Street, Glasgow later that year, and John F. Herring, whose work became so famous there was scarcely a village in the British Empire without a copy.

As for the horses, The Flying Dutchman was retired to stud after the race. Voltigeur, on the other hand, carried on racing. The very day after the match race, he went down to defeat in the Ainsty Hunt Cup, conceding 37 pounds to a classy filly named Nancy.

The next season, when he was five, he won the race named in honour of his old rival, The Flying Dutchman Handicap, run at York, before finishing unplaced in his final three racecourse appearances, including the Ascot Gold Cup, and then retiring to stud himself.
