= York Racecourse railway station =

Station in North Yorkshire, England, 1860–1939

York Racecourse
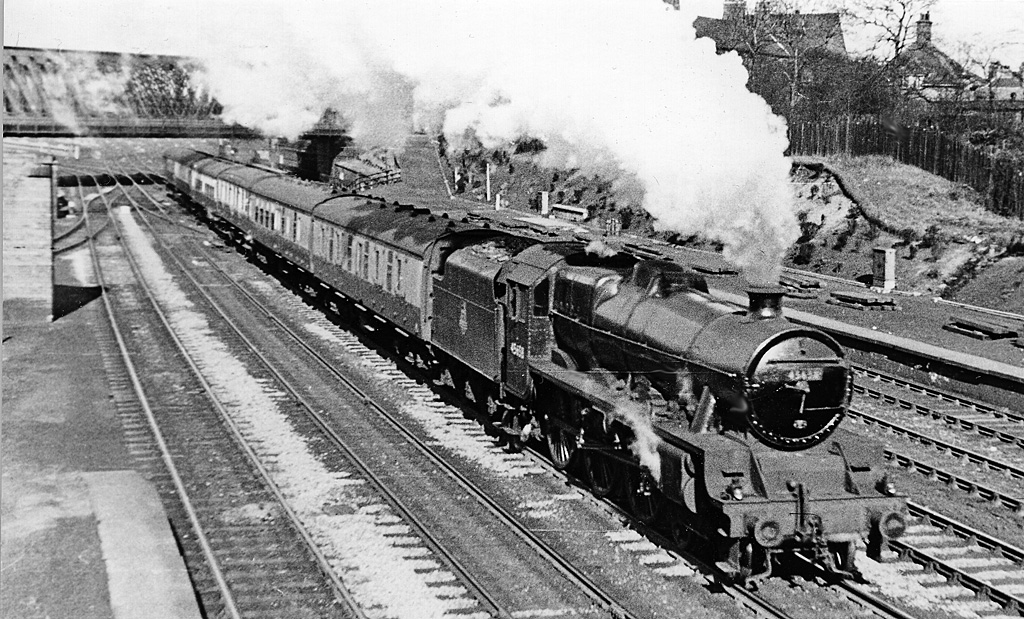
- The platforms and ramps seen in 1955

General information
- Location: Holgate, North Yorkshire; England
- Coordinates: 53.9533°N 1.1001°W
- Grid reference: SE591511
- Platforms: 2 (initially); 3 (later added)

Other information
- Status: Disused

History
- Original company: North Eastern Railway
- Post-grouping: London and North Eastern Railway

Key dates
- 14 December 1860: Opened
- 24 August 1939: Closed
Location

York Racecourse railway station, also known as York Holgate Excursion Platform and Holgate Bridge ticket platform, served Knavesmire Racecourse in Holgate, York, England, from 1860 to 1939 on the York and North Midland Railway.

== History ==
The station was opened on 14 December 1860 by the North Eastern Railway. It was only used on race days; an advertisement from 1866 by the Great Northern Railway for the York Races states that a special train will call at "Holgate Bridge Ticket Platform...[to] prevent crowding on the station platform [at York]. A cattle dock and a third platform were added on 25 September 1861. The sidings were used when the passenger numbers became too high, although this drew complaints due to delays and chaos. After the widening works of 1877 (when York station was moved to another position), access to the platforms was via a small ramp located at the eastern end of Holgate Bridge. The station was last used for the races on 24 August 1939. Not much of the platforms remain.

Preceding station	Disused railways	Following station
York (original); Line open, station closed	North Eastern Railway	Copmanthorpe; Line open, station closed
