= Holgate Bridge =

Road bridge in York, England

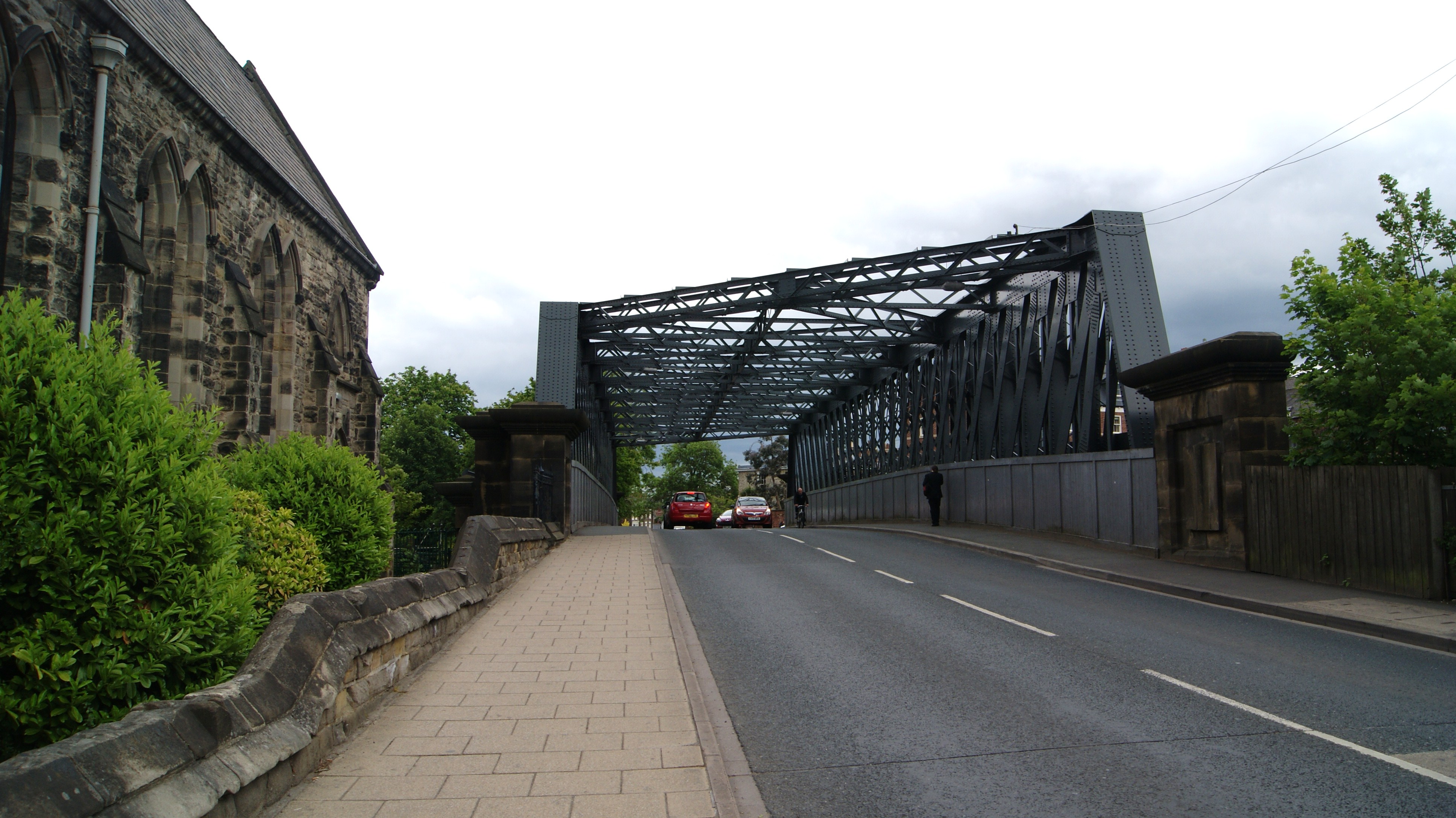
- Holgate Bridge looking eastwards along the A59 into York
- Coordinates: 53.9538°N 1.0992°W
- Carries: A59 road
- Crosses: East Coast Main Line
- Locale: York, England
- Other name: Iron Bridge

Characteristics
- Design: Pratt truss
- Material: Steel and concrete

History
- Engineering design by: Handyside (Derby)
- Opened: August 1911

Location
- Interactive map of Holgate Bridge

Holgate Bridge is an iron girder bridge in Holgate, York, England, which straddles the railway lines heading south out of the station. The bridge is set at a skew in comparison to the railway lines underneath, and carries the A59 road into, and out of, York city centre. The current bridge opened on 1 August 1911, and is the third bridge built at that location. During works carried out in the late 1980s when the East Coast Main Line was electrified, the bridge was raised by 12 inches (300 mm) to enable overhead line equipment to be installed underneath.

== History ==
The first bridge over the railway at the site was opened in 1839 on completion of the York & North Midland Railway line which connected with other lines at Milford to the south. This only had two tracks underneath the bridge and was 24 feet (7.3 m) wide, but in 1877, with the opening of the new (and present) station in York, this was increased to six lines. The first bridge over the railway was known as Holdgate Bridge and was not covered over at either side, which represented a perceived danger for horses crossing the bridge and getting spooked by passing steam engines.

The 1877 bridge, which was built from brick, was found to be unsuitable for the road widening scheme necessitated by the installation of a tram line between the city centre and Acomb, so the new bridge was built over the tracks at the site, with the York Corporation contributing £3,500 (equivalent to £410,000 in 2023) towards the cost of the new bridge. Installation of the current bridge started in 1910, and consists of over 450 tonnes (500 tons) of steel and 350 cubic yards (270 m^{3}) of concrete. The 1911 bridge weighs 1,400 tonnes (1,500 tons), and is 109 feet (33.2 m) long. The current Holgate Bridge is the third such bridge over the railway at that location, and it carries the A59 road into and out of York city centre over the railway lines heading south-west from York railway station.

The bridge is a Pratt truss design with diagonal sections on the sides that overlap and reduce in size towards the centre of the bridge. Due to the nature of the structure, the bridge is known locally as either the Iron Bridge, or Meccano Bridge. The creation of a new bridge occurred as the tram system was in expansion around the city around that time, and the bridge was too narrow for the trams to go across, so passengers had to de-tram at one end, walk across the bridge, and board another tram at the opposite end. Although used sporadically, an excursion railway station at the southern end of the bridge was accessed by a ramp to the eastern end of the Holgate Bridge. The station opened in 1860 and was last used in 1939, though the platforms remained until 1964.

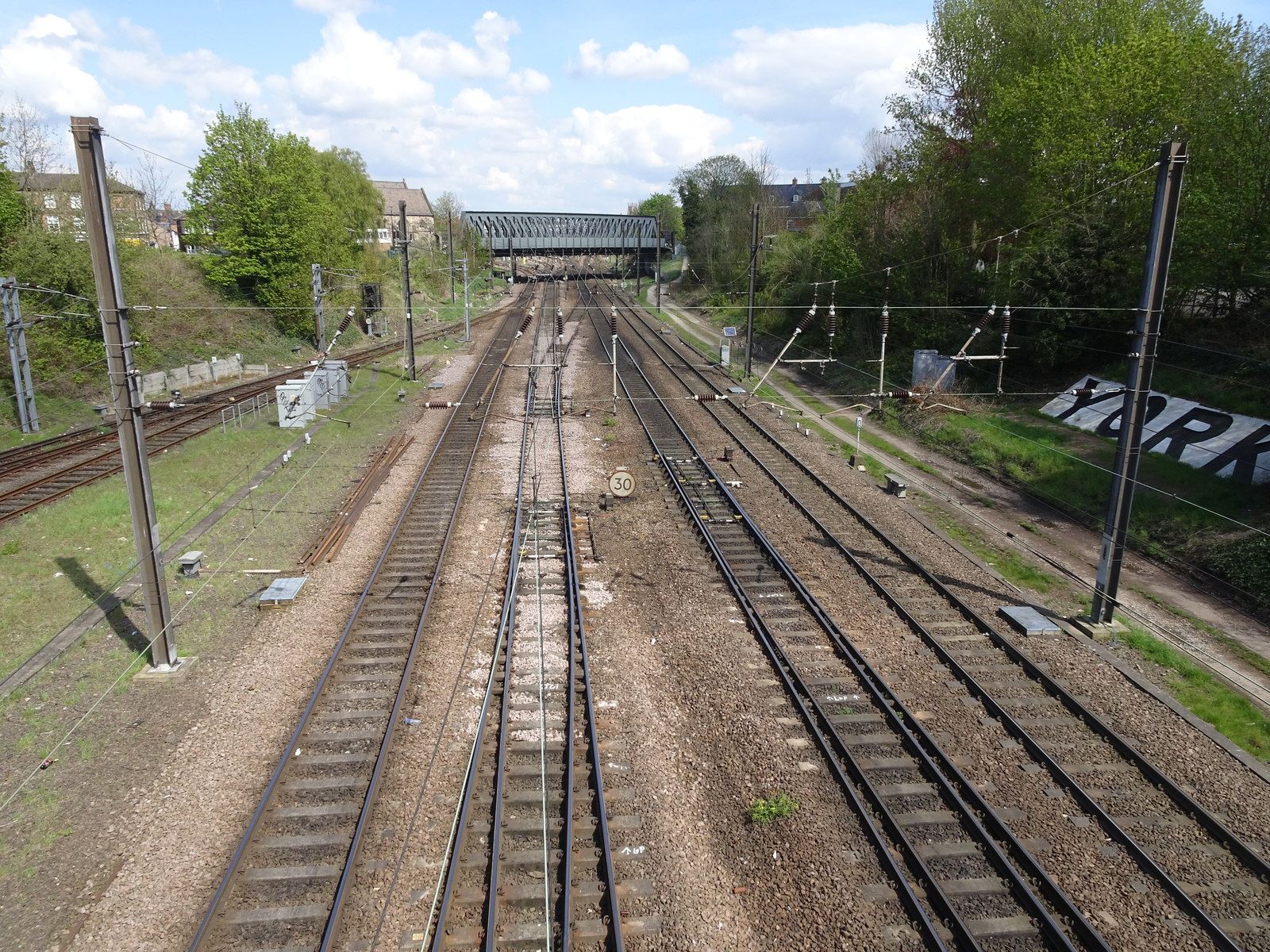
Holgate Bridge seen looking north-eastwards into York

During the electrification works on the East Coast Main Line (when overhead wires were laid out between Peterborough and Edinburgh) in the late 1980s, Holgate Bridge was jacked up to provide clearance underneath the bridge to enable the wires to be installed. Jacking the bridge up prevented having to lower the tracks which would have involved costly digging out works, and replacement with a new bridge would have more than double the cost of the jacking-up works (£410,000 in 1988 equivalent to £1,389,000 in 2023). To lift the 1,400-tonne (1,500-ton) bridge, twelve jacks (each with a capacity to lift 200 tonnes (200 long tons; 220 short tons)) were installed at each corner and along the length of the bridge, and due to the skew-nature of the bridge, special overhead bracing was needed to keep the bridge in alignment.

When the electrification of the lines through York was completed, the station area and approaching lines were remodelled, and the number of tracks that Holgate Bridge spanned was reduced, from seven to four. Further renovation and maintenance work was carried out on the structure in 2007, at a cost of £1 million (equivalent to £1,752,000 in 2023). In railway terms, Holgate Bridge is 188 miles 7 chains (302.7 km) north of London King's Cross railway station, and 33 chains (2,200 ft; 660 m) south of York railway station.

=== Holgate Beck bridge ===
The name of Holgate Bridge was known before the arrival of the railways, as it was the marker point in the 14th and 15th centuries where the Liberty of York extended to on its western side. This bridge is the one which straddles Holgate Beck in the Holgate/Acomb area. Between the late Middle Ages and 1824, the site of the bridge marked the edge of the City of York. The boundary followed Holgate Beck to the River Ouse, and was marked (sometimes annually) by the mayor on a horse, and so was known as a ridden boundary.

== See also ==
- Bridges of York
