= York Central (development) =

Development in York, England

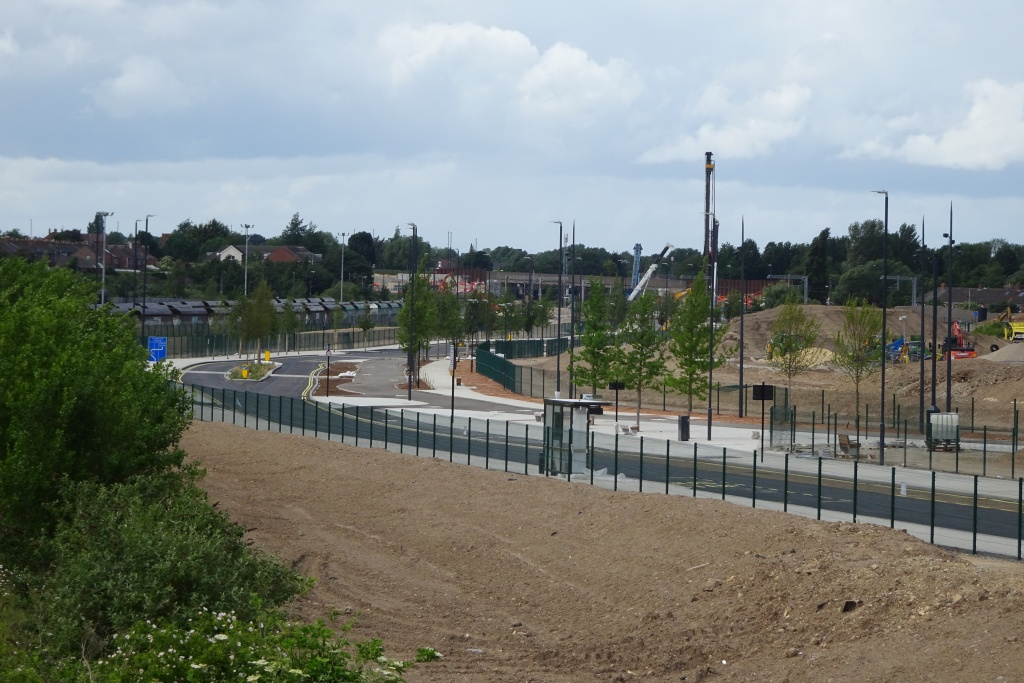
- Park Street, the main road of the York Central development, in June 2025

Project
- Construction started: 2021
- Construction cost: £650 million (2019)
- Status: In progress
- Developer: York Central Partnership
- Website: Official website

Location
- Location of York Central
- Coordinates: 53.958°N 1.102°W
- Country: England
- City: York

Area
  - Total: 45 ha (110 acres)

York Central is a development on former railway land to the west of York railway station in York, England. The 45-hectare (110-acre) site is one of the largest brownfield developments in England. York Central is sometimes referred to as The Teardrop, because of the shape the development takes when viewed from above. Work on York Central started in 2021, and is expected to deliver 2,500 homes and 1,200,000 square feet (110,000 m^{2}) of commercial space.

== History ==
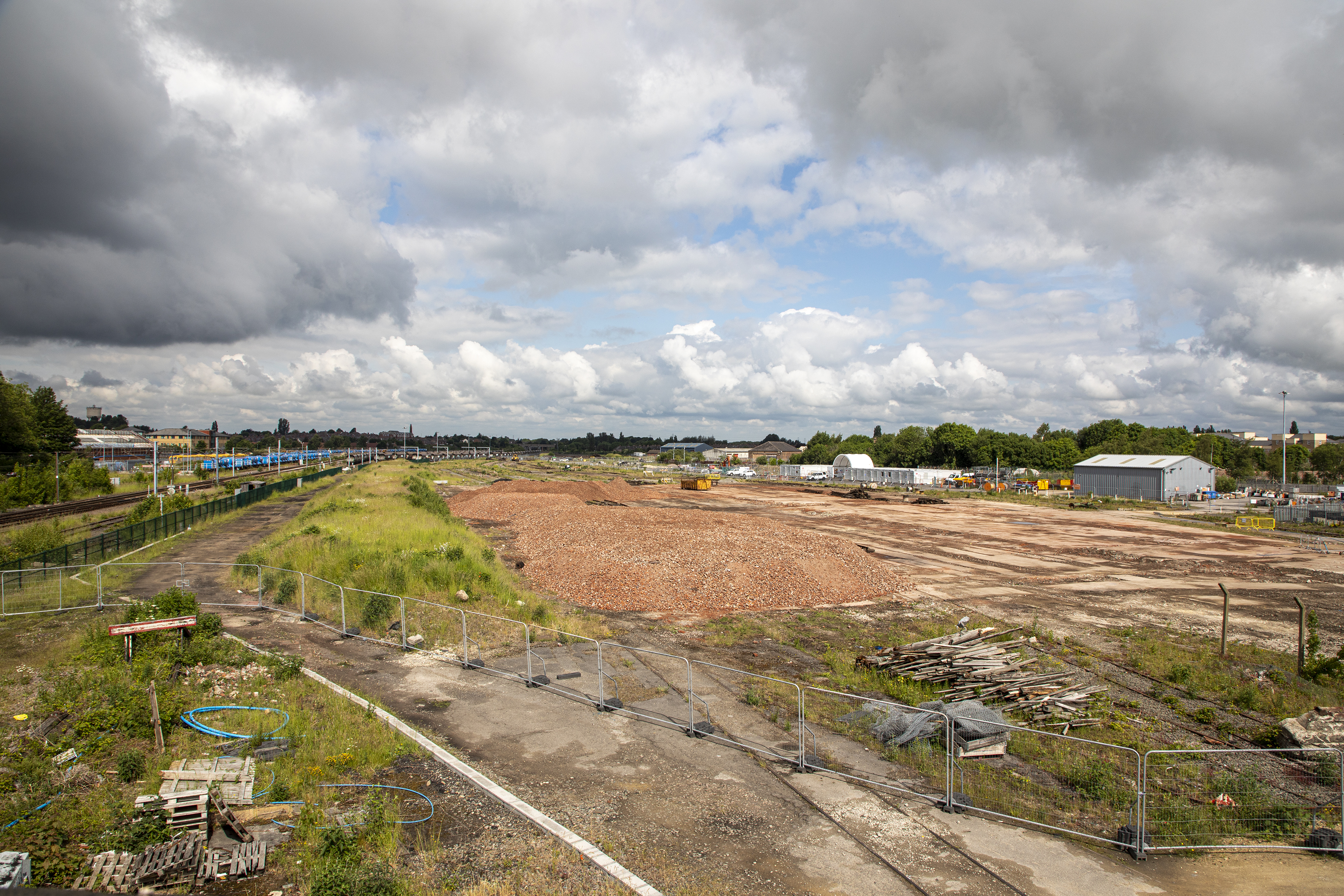
The site of York Central in June 2021 prior to construction work beginning

City of York Council and other interested bodies, had been discussing the York Central site for at least a decade before outline approval was granted in 2020. A timetable set out in 2004 detailed the building of 3,000 homes on 85 acres (34 ha) of land, with work expected to start in 2008. In 2009, the project, then estimated to cost £1 billion, was shelved due to the worldwide recession. As the site to be developed is "landlocked by railway lines", City of York Council set aside £10 million in 2014, to enable an access road to be built into the development from the A59 road. The designated area was granted Enterprise Zone status in November 2015.

The development occupies land that was previously used to maintain and store railway freight wagons. The East Coast Main Line would form a boundary to the east and the north, whilst the freight avoiding lines in York would border the south and west side. The development is due to deliver 2,500 homes, an upgrade to the National Railway Museum (NRM), a commercial area of 1,200,000 square feet (110,000 m^{2}) and an upgrade to the railway station. The developers stated in 2019 that 20% (500) of the homes would be affordable. In addition, a new entrance to York railway station would be built, facing towards the NRM, however, Leeman Road would be closed permanently where it runs adjacent to the NRM site. Plans from 2018 showed more six-storey apartment blocks than houses, cafes, restaurants, and a hotel in the centre of the commercial area, which is adjacent to the railway station.

The developer is York Central Partnership, which consists of Homes England, Network Rail, the National Railway Museum and City of York Council. In June 2019, the project was costed at £650 million. The shape of the land to be developed, appears to look like a teardrop between two sets of railway lines, hence its alternative name. A concurrent project will see the current main entrance into York railway station remodelled, including the removal of the Queen Street Bridge.

With the launch of Great British Railways (GBR), a successor to Network Rail, there were calls to site the GBR headquarters at York Central though Derby was subsequently chosen. Work on the site started with a clearance programme in January 2021, as part of the infrastructure works. In July 2022, construction company John Sisk & Son were contracted to begin work on £100 million of infrastructure including a bridge over the railway. In December 2023, McLaren and Arlington were appointed as the strategic developer for the site. Also in December, a reserved matters planning application was submitted for a six storey office building with a basement and retail space at ground floor level as part of a Government Hubs Programme with capacity for about 2,600 full-time employees.

Reserved matters planning approval was granted in February 2024 for a new hard surfaced public square with soft landscaping to be located between York railway station and the National Railway Museum.

== Access ==
Originally envisioned with an access road off the A59 at Holgate, the favoured vehicular access route is via a new spine road at Water End, on the east side of Severus Bridge (the A1176 road linking the A59 with the A19). This would entail building a road with bicycle and pedestrian access across Millennium Green. The only other road access into the development is constrained at both ends by bridges with height restrictions. Millennium Green is a 6.5 acres (2.6 ha) green space at the northern end of the York Central Development. Millennium Green is bounded on the west by the railway, and on the east by Holgate Beck.

York City councillors from the Green Party have expressed reservations about car use stating that the development should remain as low-carbon as possible, calling for an ultra-low sulphur zone with only buses allowed in regularly.
