= York Hoard =

Flint tool hoard from North Yorkshire, England

The York Hoard is a hoard of Neolithic flint tools from York, North Yorkshire, England.

== Discovery ==
The hoard was discovered in September 1868 by workmen digging for the Northern and Eastern Railway two miles (3.2 km) from York, near Acomb. The discovery was reported to the Yorkshire Philosophical Society in a lecture of 1869 by Edward Allen. Subsequent research by Jeffrey Radley reported that the hoard was located "near Holgate Beck, 400yds from its junction with the Ouse".

== Contents of the hoard ==
Edward Allen reported that the workmen had found "14 to 20 axes, many spearheads, and at least a bushel of flakes". The worked flint tools were given to Charles Monkman of Malton, and the flakes were used as ballast for the train line. Allen acquired some of the axes and spearheads from one of the workmen. Twenty objects from the hoard remain in the collection of the Yorkshire Museum: 7 axeheads, 3 arrowheads, 9 spearheads, 3 scrapers, 11 blades and flakes, and 2 worked points.

=== Public display ===
The hoard was on public display in the Yorkshire Museum by 1881.
