= Chute (racecourse) =

Straight start on a horse racing course

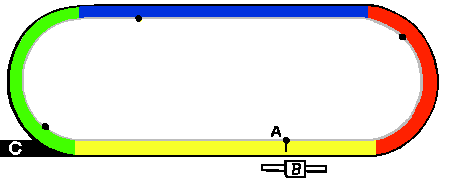
Generic left-handed racetrack diagram: A = finish line, B = grandstand, C/black = chute, Yellow = homestretch, Red = clubhouse turn, Blue = backstretch, Green = far turn, gray inside line = rail and the white center is the infield.

In horse racing, a chute is an extended path increasing the length of a straight portion of a racecourse, particularly an oval-shaped one, allowing races of a specified distance to start at a location other than on one of the turns.

For example, many racetracks in the United States are exactly one mile (1,600 m) in circumference; often such racetracks are symmetrical ovals, with both straightaways and both turns being precisely 1/4 of a mile (400 m). Frequently, the finish line will be positioned exactly three-quarters of the way down the stretch; in that case, the point at which the first or "clubhouse" turn joins to the backstretch would be 5 1/2 furlongs (1,100 m) from the finish. In order to hold races at the distance of 6 furlongs (1,200 m) – the most common distance of American thoroughbred horse races – the backstretch is extended by an extra 1/16 of a mile (100 m). This is the most common situation where a chute is pressed into service. At some tracks, this chute is longer, so that races can be run at 7 furlongs (1,400 m) as well.

Often a second chute will be placed at the top of the stretch, extending the length of the straightaway from the top of the stretch to the finish line from 3/16 of a mile (300 m) to 1/4 mile (400 m), thus allowing 1 1/4-mile (2,000 m) races to be run, and also make it possible for quarter horses to run races at distances of up to 440 yards (400 m). At two tracks, Hialeah Park and Turf Paradise, the chute that begins at the top of the stretch is even longer, so that there is a distance of 3 furlongs (600 m) from the beginning of the chute to the wire; so-called "baby races," or races for 2-year-olds run very early in the year, are started from this position.

Many one-mile (1,600 m) tracks have a turf (grass) course inside of the main (dirt) track, most commonly measuring 7 furlongs (1,400 m). This turf course will often be equipped with a chute of its own, extending diagonally from the stretch, to permit turf races to be run at the distance of 1 1/8 miles (1,800 m). This diagonal chute can either consist of a more-or-less straight line, or may curve significantly, in a counterclockwise direction. In 2006 two tracks — Monmouth Park and Hollywood Park Racetrack — added a chute extending diagonally from the backstretch, to permit races at 5 1/2 furlongs and 6 furlongs, respectively (the corresponding circumferences of these two tracks' turf courses being 7 furlongs and 1 mile plus 145 feet).

Some American racetracks have circumferences of more (or, generally in the case of minor-circuit tracks, less) than one mile (1,600 m); examples include Aqueduct, Arlington Park, Hollywood Park Racetrack and Saratoga, all of which are 1 1/8 miles (1,800 m) tracks, and Belmont Park, the country's largest track, with a 1 1/2-mile (2,400 m) circumference. The backstretch chutes at Aqueduct and Arlington Park are long enough to permit races to be run at one mile (1,600 m), while Saratoga's chute is shorter, extending only to 7 furlongs (1,400 m). Hollywood's chute formerly allowed one mile (1,600 m) races, but when its finish line was moved forward in the late 1980s one mile (1,600 m) races could no longer be accommodated, and 7 1/2 furlongs (1,500 m) became the longest distance that could be run out of its chute (an unintended consequence of this was that by the mid-2000s 7 1/2-furlong (1,500 m) dirt races had gained considerable popularity in the United States when such races had rarely if ever been run before at most tracks, even those where the track's configuration made it possible to do so). At Belmont, the chute permits races at distances up to 1 1/8 miles (1,800 m) to be run (formerly up to 1 1/4 miles [2,000 m], but this chute, which at one point crossed over the training track, was truncated in the late 1970s to eliminate the aforementioned cross-over, and today 1 1/4 miles [2,000 m] dirt races at Belmont actually start on the clubhouse turn, the only situation where races do this at any major American track). Belmont's outer (Widener) turf course also contains two chutes which separate from the beginning of the backstretch at an angle; races at distances of one mile (1,600 m) and 1 1/16 miles (1,700 m) are started from these chutes.

Rarely, a "half-chute" will be employed; in this instance, the chute will branch off from a turn, usually the clubhouse turn, at the midway point of the turn, and extend to a position level with that of the homestretch, the chute thus joining to the turn at a 90-degree angle. Currently two racetracks of note in the United States — Saratoga and Ellis Park Racecourse in Kentucky — make use of such a chute, starting races from it at the distance of one mile (both are 1 1/8 mile [1,811 m] tracks). At Saratoga, this is known as the "Wilson Mile" chute. Use of the Wilson Mile chute was suspended in 1972; after being reinstated briefly in the late 1980s and early 1990s, the chute itself was dismantled. Until the chute's reinstallation in 2022, it was not possible to run main-track (dirt) races at Saratoga at any distance longer than 7 furlongs (1,400 m) but shorter than 1 1/8 miles (1,800 m). The "all-weather" (dirt) track at England's Wolverhampton Racecourse has a similar chute, but it is used for 7-furlong races as the latter is a one-mile (1.6 km) track. The one-mile dirt oval at Tampa Bay Downs in Oldsmar, Florida also once had a similar chute which permitted races at 7 furlongs; however, this chute extended diagonally from the backstretch and not on a 90-degree angle. In 2004 Tampa Bay Downs' backstretch chute was lengthened to 7 furlongs, whereupon the diagonal chute was decommissioned; however, remnants of it are still intact. Laurel Park in Maryland also formerly had a diagonal chute, which allowed for races at up to 1 1/16 miles.

Perhaps America's most distinctive horse racing chute is the El Camino Real Chute, located at Santa Anita. Added in 1953, this is a downhill turf chute consisting of a straight section, a right turn (unique in modern American horse racing), another straight section, and a long, sweeping left turn, before finally crossing over the dirt course and joining the turf oval. The chute was modeled to give the appearance of a European-type course. Grass sprints at about 6 1/2 furlongs (actual distance 64 1/2 feet less than same), as well as the marathon distance of about 1 3/4 miles (actual distance 262 1/2 feet less than same, and generally used only once a year for the San Juan Capistrano Invitational race), utilize the full length of the El Camino Real Chute. Turf races at 1 1/4 miles and 1 1/2 miles also start from various points within the chute, and races at 1 1/8 miles (a very common turf distance at American tracks) start directly on the dirt crossover. At 1 1/4 miles and longer, the horses are then required to go once around Santa Anita's turf oval, which is somewhat larger and narrower than most turf courses situated inside one-mile dirt tracks (9/10ths of a mile, or 7 furlongs plus 132 feet; this is also the case at Golden Gate Fields racetrack in Albany, California).

The word chute is also used in Australia where there are chutes at Rosehill Gardens Racecourse, Canterbury Park Racecourse, and Flemington Racecourse.
