= Charles Marlow (jockey) =

English jockey

Charles Marlow (1814–1882) was an English jockey of the mid 19th century period, known for his honesty and integrity. He is perhaps best remembered today for his association with Lord Eglington's horse The Flying Dutchman, on which he won the Derby, and St. Leger. He was badly injured during a race in 1855 and when he returned to the saddle he struggled to regain his form. His last years were spent in a workhouse and he died in an asylum.

== Early years ==
Marlow was born in a hamlet called Thorney Lanes in the parish of Newborough, Staffordshire, about 8 miles west of Burton upon Trent. As a youth he worked in racing stables at Newmarket and Epsom. His first win as a jockey came in 1831 on a horse called Gab at the July Cheltenham meeting, riding at 7st. and later that year, at 6st 12lb, he won a race on Lord Warwick's Water Witch.

Marlow settled in Rugeley, Staffordshire, a short distance from the racing stables at Hednesford. The trainers who worked in the area at the time included Thomas Walters, Thomas Carr, William Saunders, Thomas Flintoff, and Samuel Lord. Owners who had their horses in training at Hednesford included Edmund Peel (brother of Sir Robert Peel), Aldermand William Taylor Copeland, Captain Thomas Lamb and Lord Warwick. Marlow rode for many of them and had early wins on Copeland's King Cole in the 1838 Chester Cup, and three days later for Captain Lamb in the Marquis of Westminster's Plate riding Chit Chat. Marlowe continued to ride for Alderman Copeland for several years, primarily in the Staffordshire and midland districts. He rode Copeland's outsider Mustapha Muley in the 1841 Epsom Derby and Combermere the following year, both unplaced. In a review of the 1842 season he was among the country's top winning jockeys.

== The Flying Dutchman ==
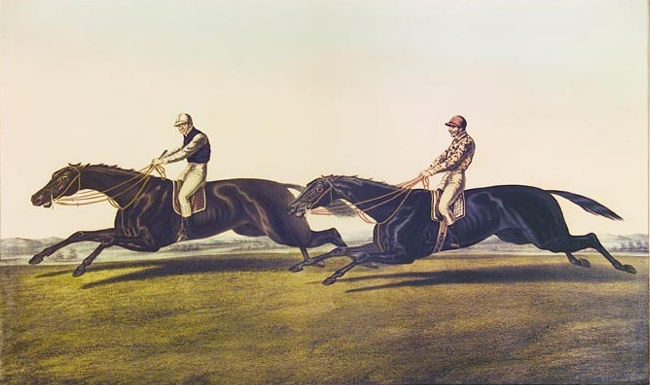
York May 13, 1851, Voltigeur (Flatman) is beaten by The Flying Dutchman (Marlow)

In the 1840s and into the 1850s Marlow had further success in top flight races. In 1844 he won the Royal Hunt Cup at Ascot on Bishop of Romford's Cob; in 1848 he won the Goodwood Cup on Lord Eglinton's Von Tromp and in 1849 the Ascot Gold Cup on the same horse; in 1849 he won both The Derby and the St. Leger on Eglinton's The Flying Dutchman; in 1851 he won the City and Suburban Handicap (Epsom), again on an Eglinton horse called Elthiron, and in 1853 he won The Oaks on Catherine Hayes.

The Flying Dutchman is now considered to be one of the top race horses of all times. He was undefeated until 1850 when he came up against Lord Zetland's Voltigeur, the Epsom Derby winner of that year. This was in the Doncaster Cup in a two horse race over two and a half miles; Nat Flatman was on Voltigeur and Marlow on the Dutchman. From the off, Marlow set a remarkable pace but his horse started to tire. This allowed Flatman to ease back in contention and eventually win the race. The result stunned the racing world and reduced Marlow to tears. It later transpired that the animal may not have been at its best, having been over exerted in training, off its feed and giving away 19 pounds to Voltigeur. It was also rumoured that Marlow may have been drinking before the race and this possibly impaired his judgement.

A rematch was arranged for the two horses and this took place at the York spring meeting on 13 May 1851 over two miles, with the same jockeys. There was huge public interest in the race (it came to be known as The Great Match) and even special trains were laid on from London. Voltigeur received only an 8½ pound allowance on this occasion and during the race Marlow played a waiting game, being behind by three lengths at the half-way stage. As they neared the finish he gradually overtook Flatman and won by a length. The Flying Dutchman never raced again but was sent to stud where he had a successful and influential career.

== Final years ==
In 1855 Marlow broke his leg when his horse, William Palmer's Nettle, fell during the running of the Epsom Oaks. (Note: Palmer was arrested later that year for murder and executed in June 1856.) The injury was such that a long layoff was necessary, and some observers even thought that his career would be over. Tattersall's started a benefit collection for him and a national newspaper reported it had reached over £600 by the end of July. In March 1858 a notice was placed in the London Gazette stating that “Charles Marlow, formerly of Hazle Slade, in the parish of Rugely, in the county of Stafford, Jockey” was an insolvent debtor. In July 1858 Marlow's wife died and shortly after he was seeking a job as a private trainer. The reason given was that he could no longer make the riding weights for a jockey. Marlow had married Mary Anne Saunders (daughter of trainer Thomas Saunders) in 1844 and following her death it appears that their children were placed with relatives. The couple had at least six children, four boys and two girls. The eldest boys, Charles and Henry were living with their uncle, trainer William Saunders, working as stable lads (aged respectively 15 and 13). The youngest two boys, William and Thomas, were with another uncle on a farm at Great Wyrley. William was later at John Porter's stables at Highclere from the age of 13, until his death in 1870 when he was 18. Of the two girls, Charlotte found work as a barmaid and Mary married a miner.

Marlow eventually made a return to the saddle in 1859 and his first race was in the Biennial Stakes at Bath on Colonel Pearson's Man-at-Arms. He rode for Mr Sutton and others before becoming the stable jockey for Tommy Parr in 1861 at his Benham stables, Letcombe Regis. His last race was in 1863 after which he worked at Tom Olliver's Wroughton stables. Olliver was concerned for Marlow's wellbeing; in an interview he told a reporter that "he [Marlow] shall never want a crust so long as I have one to give him".

After the death of Olliver in 1872, Marlow was said to be living in "indigent circumstances". One of the owners with horses in training at Wroughton - Mr William Sheward Cartwright - started a collection for Marlow and became his benefactor by employing him as a helper in the stables. (Note: Cartwright was also the owner of 1874 Derby winner George Frederick) This was confirmed in a newspaper report for the August 1875 race meeting at York, where Marlow was identified as the groom for two of Cartwright's horses - Louise Victoria and Maud Victoria (full sisters to the 1874 Derby winner George Frederick). In 1880 Cartwright sold off his horses and died later in the same year. In June 1879 Marlow was admitted to the Highworth and Swindon Union Workhouse. In the 1881 census Marlow's occupation is given as "Jockey, 1849 winner of the Derby with The Flying Dutchman". In October 1881 he was admitted to the Wiltshire County Asylum where he died the following year.
