= Holgate Beck =

River in York, England

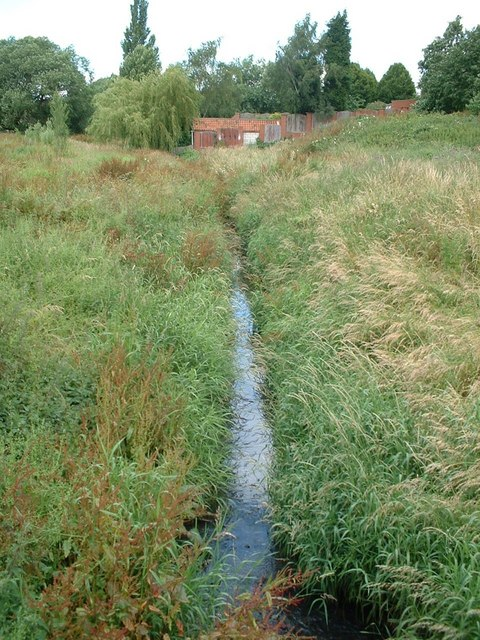
- Holgate Beck flowing through Millennium Green

- Location within York
- Etymology: Named after Holgate, the suburb it flows through

Location
- Country: England
- City: York

Physical characteristics
- Source
  - location: Askham Bog
  - coordinates: 53.925°N 1.125°W
  - elevation: 39 feet (12 m)
- Mouth
  - location: Water End
  - coordinates: 53.965°N 1.110°W
  - elevation: 33 feet (10 m)
- Length: 4.28 miles (6.88 km)
- Basin size: 2,650 acres (1,072 ha)
- Discharge
  - location: Water End

Basin features
- Progression: River Ouse→ Humber Estuary→ North Sea.

Holgate Beck is a small watercourse that flows north-eastwards through Holgate across the west side of the City of York, England. Primarily flowing through Holgate, from which it derives its name, the beck drains a large part of Askham Bog and Hob Moor, then running underneath the various lines near York railway station. It empties into the River Ouse at Water End, being one of five main tributaries for the River Ouse in York, and consequently added to the flooding in the river and immediate environs. To counter this, some flood diversionary schemes have been implemented near to Askham Bog and Hob Moor.

The Environment Agency list Holgate Beck as a Critical Ordinary Watercourse (COW) due to the potential for flooding from the beck.

== History ==
Holgate Beck flows for 4.28 miles (6.88 km) (Note: Some Environment Agency documents list the beck as being 4.4 miles (7.1 km) long.) from a small pond on the east side of the A1237 at Askham Bryan, to the River Ouse at Water End in York. Ordnance Survey mapping shows Holgate Beck starting near to Hob Moor School, but the Environment Agency show the beck starting further south west and draining Askham Bog. Similarly, the internal drainage board map shows the confluence of two becks at Askham Bog to be the start of the named watercourse. Askham Bog is drained by two streams on either side; Askham Bog Drain and Pike Hill Drain, which join at the north-eastern end of the bog and are pumped onwards by an Internal Drainage Board flood station. This consists of two weirs than can rise up to prevent water flowing into Holgate Beck, allowing it to be diverted through the Knavesmire Culvert. The water from Knavesmire Culvert reaches the Ouse near to Bishopthorpe Palace. From Askham Bog it drains north-eastwards past Dringhouses and through Holgate, where it enters a culvert by The Fox public house, then travelling some 16 feet (5 m) under the railway lines before re-appearing at Millennium Green for a short distance above ground until it is pumped into the River Ouse at Water End.

A pumping station at the outfall of the beck at Water End was installed to prevent the River Ouse back-flooding the beck. At Askham Bog, the height above sea level is 39 feet (12 m), and in the first 2.2 miles (3.5 km), the beck only falls by 4.7 inches (12 cm). At the outfall, the beck is at 33 feet (10 m) above sea level.

In Medieval times, a corn mill was located on the beck on Hob Moor. The mill was mentioned as far back as 1563, but was destroyed by fire in 1600. It was rebuilt in 1601, and was used as a place to house plague victims, which "discouraged people from taking corn to the mill". In 1868, works to install a gas plant for the North Eastern Railway led to the discovery of the York Hoard at the outfall of Holgate Beck into the River Ouse. As the outfall area of Holgate Beck is known to have been on a trade route that crossed the Ouse in that location, there is the belief that more archaeological remains lay there waiting to be discovered. In 1884, when Holgate Ward was incorporated into the City of York, the beck became the natural border.

The beck drains an area of 2,650 acres (1,072 ha), and flows across peat bogs, lacustrine sands, glacial till and York Moraines. Its catchment area includes Askham Bog, Hob Moor, Woodthorpe, Acomb and Holgate. The Environment Agency classify the watercourse as being 'heavily modified', and at the northern end it is enclosed under the railway yards and the proposed York Central Development. At the northern end of the watercourse, the beck formed the eastern edge of Millennium Green open space and is central to helping with flood alleviation of the York Central Development scheme.

Holgate Beck derives its name from the suburb that it flows through. Holgate is an Anglo-Saxon word meaning Hollow Street.

== Flooding ==
Historic flooding of York has been recorded often. Currently, Holgate Beck does not have any active flood defences (such as a barrier), however, some schemes have been implemented such as diversionary pipes to take water away to the south of the city rather the flowing northwards towards the Ouse. In 1980 and 1982, earthen banks were built at the unculverted lower reaches after flooding of Leeman Road properties in 1978. This area had also been affected by flooding in 1947. The historical flooding of 1947, 1978 and the early 1980s, has been attributed to backflow from the River Ouse when that watercourse has been in extreme flood situations. This led to the construction of the pumping station at Water End.

In 2014, the Water End Flood Alleviation Scheme created a height differential between the Ouse and Holgate Beck so that back-flooding from the Ouse was prevented. In doing so, estimates state that at least 400 homes and businesses in the area are protected from flooding. However, in times of extreme rainfall, the beck can still flood the surrounding area.

Besides the two main rivers in York (Ouse and Foss), Holgate Beck is one of five 'Critical Ordinary Watercourses' (COWs) in York which are maintained by the Environment Agency. The beck was transferred from the Marston Moor Internal Drainage Board to the Environment Agency in 2006, due to its COW designation. The EA define a COW as "..watercourses that are not classified as “main river” but which the Environment Agency and other operating authorities agree are critical because they have the potential to put at risk from flooding large numbers of people and property."

== Wildlife ==
Water vole are believed to be inhabiting the area of the beck in and around Millennium Green. This habitat is potentially at risk from the York Central Development.
