= Cumberland House (disambiguation) =

Cumberland House is a mansion in London, England.

Cumberland House may also refer to:

- Cumberland House, York, a building in England
- Cumberland House, Saskatchewan, a town and former fur trading post in Canada
- Cumberland House Provincial Park, an historic park in Saskatchewan
- Cumberland House Cree Nation, an Indian reserve in Saskatchewan
