= History of York =

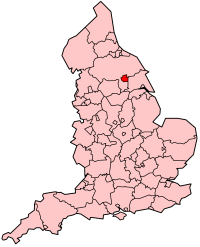
York within England

The history of York, England, as a city dates to the beginning of the first millennium AD but archaeological evidence for the presence of people in the region of York dates back much further to between 8000 and 7000 BC. As York was a town in Roman times, its Celtic name is recorded in Roman sources (as Eboracum and Eburacum); after 400, Angles took over the area and adapted the name by folk etymology to Old English Eoforwīc or Eoforīc, which means "wild-boar town" or "rich in wild-boar". The Vikings, who took over the area later, in turn adapted the name by folk etymology to Norse Jórvík meaning "wild-boar bay", 'jór' being a contraction of the Old Norse word for wild boar, 'jǫfurr'. The modern Welsh name is Efrog.

After the Anglian settlement of the North of England, Anglian York was first capital of Deira and later Northumbria, and by the early 7th century, York was an important royal centre for the Northumbrian kings. Following the Norman Conquest of 1066 York was substantially damaged, but in time became an important urban centre as the administrative centre of the county of Yorkshire. York prospered during much of the later medieval era; the later years of the 14th and the earlier years of the 15th centuries were characterised by particular prosperity. During the English Civil War, the city was regarded as a Royalist stronghold and was besieged and eventually captured by Parliamentary forces under Lord Fairfax in 1644. After the war, York retained its pre-eminence in the North, and, by 1660, was the third-largest city in England after London and Norwich.

Modern York has 34 Conservation Areas, 2,084 Listed buildings and 22 Scheduled Ancient Monuments in its care. Every year, thousands of tourists come to see the surviving medieval buildings, interspersed with Roman and Viking remains and Georgian architecture.

== Prehistoric settlement ==
Archaeological evidence suggests that people were settled in the region of York between 8000 and 7000 BC, although it is not known if these were permanent or temporary settlements. Polished stone axes indicate the presence of people during the Neolithic period in the area where the city of York is now, especially on the south-west bank of the River Ouse, just outside the city centre near where Scarborough Bridge is now. A small lithic assemblage dating to the Neolithic was found during excavations on Wetherby Road. Evidence for people continues into the Bronze Age with a hoard of flint tools and weapons found by Holgate Beck between the railway and the River Ouse, burials and bronzes found on both sides of the River Ouse and a beaker vessel found in Bootham. 2018 excavations also uncovered a pit with a radiocarbon date to the Bronze Age, from which a rubber-stone for a saddle quern was recovered.

Iron Age burials have been found near the area on the south-west bank of the Ouse where the concentration of Neolithic axes was found. At the time, the area around York was pastoral with open ground or grassland subdivided by ditched enclosures and hedgerows.

Evidence of a late Iron Age farmstead has been uncovered at Lingcroft Farm 3 miles (4.8 km) away at Naburn.

== Roman Eboracum ==
Roman wall and the west corner tower (the Multangular Tower) of the Roman legionary fort at York, with medieval additions above. A telltale layer of red Roman bricks can be seen at about head height.

The Romans called the tribes in the region around York the Brigantes and the Parisii. York may have been on the border between these two tribes. During the Roman conquest of Britain the Brigantes became a Roman client state, but, when their leadership changed becoming more hostile to Rome, Roman General Quintus Petillius Cerialis led the Ninth Legion north of the Humber.

York was founded in 71 AD when Cerialis and the Ninth Legion constructed a military fortress (castra) on flat ground above the River Ouse near its junction with the River Foss. The fortress was later rebuilt in stone, covered an area of 50 acres, and was inhabited by 6,000 soldiers. The earliest known mention of Eburacum by name is from a wooden stylus tablet from the Roman fortress of Vindolanda along Hadrian's Wall, dated to c. 95–104 AD, where it is called Eburaci. Much of the Roman fortress lies under the foundations of York Minster, and excavations in the Minster's undercroft have revealed some of the original walls.

2022 excavations in Dringhouses discovered field systems laid out in the early Roman period in the York hinterland. Evidence survived in the form of a series of ditches laid out in a grid pattern respecting the line of the nearby southern approach road to York. Pottery dates indicate use and maintenance of the field system in the 2nd century AD before falling out of use in the 3rd century.

At some time between 109 AD and 122 AD the garrison of the Ninth Legion was replaced by the Sixth Legion. There is no documented trace of the Ninth Legion after 117 AD, and various theories have been proposed as to what happened to it. The Sixth Legion remained in York until the end of Roman occupation about 400 AD. The Emperors Hadrian, Septimius Severus and Constantius I all held court in York during their various campaigns. During his stay, the Emperor Severus proclaimed York capital of the province of Britannia Inferior, and it is likely that it was he who granted York the privileges of a colonia or city. Constantius I died during his stay in York, and his son Constantine the Great was proclaimed Emperor by the troops based in the fortress. Excavations in Queen Street in 2022 uncovered artefacts indicative of high-status activity during the 2nd and 3rd centuries AD, and may have been linked with the disposal of material generated as a result of development in the colonia during the 2nd and 3rd centuries AD.

Economically the military presence was important with workshops growing up to supply the needs of the 5,000 troops garrisoned there and in its early stages York operated a command economy. Production included military pottery until the mid-third century; military tile kilns have been found in the Aldwark-Peasholme Green area, glassworking at Coppergate, metalworks and leatherworks producing military equipment in Tanner Row. New trading opportunities led local people to create a permanent civilian settlement on the south-west bank of the River Ouse opposite the fortress. By 237 it had been made a colonia one of only four in Britain and the others were founded for retired soldiers. York was self-governing, with a council made up of rich locals, including merchants, and veteran soldiers.

Evidence of Roman religious beliefs in York have been found including altars to Mars, Hercules, Jupiter and Fortune, while phallic amulets are the most commonly found type of good luck charm. In terms of number of reference the most popular deities were the spiritual representation (genius) of York and the Mother Goddess; there is also evidence of local or regional deities. There was also a Christian community in York although it is not known when it was first formed and there is virtually no archaeological record of it. The first evidence of this community is a document noting the attendance of Bishop Eborius of Eboracum at the Council of Arles (314), and bishops also attended the First Council of Nicaea in 325, the Council of Serdica, and the Council of Ariminum.

By 400 AD York's fortunes had changed for the worse. The town was undergoing periodic winter floods from the rivers Ouse and Foss, its wharf-side facilities were buried under several feet of silt and the primary Roman bridge connecting the town with the fortress may have become derelict. By this time Eboracum was probably no longer a population centre, though it likely remained a centre of authority. While the colonia remained above flood levels, it was largely abandoned as well, retaining only a small ribbon of population for a time.

== Early Middle Ages ==
=== Post-Roman Ebrauc ===
There is little written evidence about York in the centuries following the Roman withdrawal from Britain in 410, a pattern repeated throughout Sub-Roman Britain. There is archaeological evidence for continued settlement at York near the Ouse in the 5th century, and private Roman houses, especially suburban villas, remained occupied after the Roman withdrawal.

Some scholars have suggested that York remained a significant regional centre for the Britons, based largely on literary evidence. Several manuscripts of the Historia Brittonum, written c. 830, contain a list of 28 or 33 "civitates", originally used to describe British tribal centres under Roman rule but here translated as Old Welsh cair (caer) and probably indicating "fortified cities". Among these settlements is Cair Ebrauc. Later, the text states that Ida was the first Anglian king of Bernicia and ruler over Cair Ebrauc. These are generally taken as references to a successor to old Roman Eburacum. This mention has led to speculation about Ebrauc in post-Roman times.

Christopher Allen Snyder makes note of the evidence for Eboracum continuing to function, perhaps as a military outpost or the seat of a minor kingdom based on some old territory of the Brigantes. Snyder cites historian and archaeologist Nick Higham in saying that the settlement had declined so much by the end of the Roman period that it was unlikely to have been a significant post-Roman regional centre.

Scholar Peter Field suggests that the City of Legions (urbs legionum) mentioned by Gildas in his 6th-century De Excidio et Conquestu Britanniae is a reference to York, rather than Caerleon; if this were the case it could provide some contemporary information about Ebrauc.

A Peredur son of Efrawg is the hero of a 12th- or 13th-century Welsh romance; this would have been a variant of Ebrauc along with "Efrawg" or "Efrog", suggesting the city had royal associations in later tradition.

What later became parts of the North Riding and City of York were conquered by a Brythonic to early Angle version of Deira, Based around the Derwent.

=== Anglo-Saxon Eoforwic ===
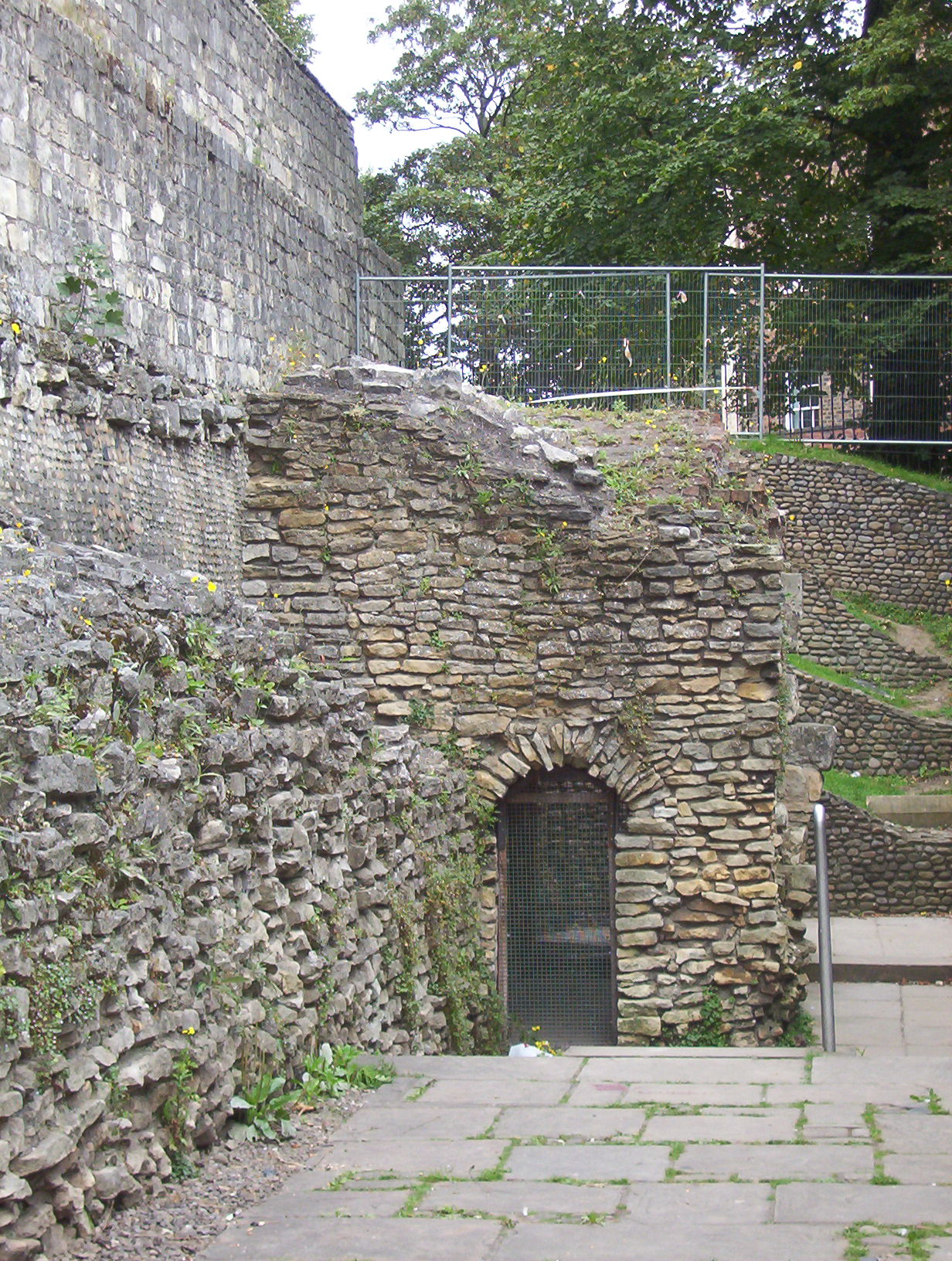
Anglian Tower

Angles settled in the area in the early 6th century. Cemeteries that are identifiably Anglian date from this period. Cremation cemeteries from the 6th century have been excavated close to York on The Mount and at Heworth; there are, however, few objects from inside the city, and whether York was settled at all at this period remains unclear. The fortress's fate after 400 AD is not clear, it is unlikely to have been a base of Romano-British power in opposition to the Anglians. Flooded area reclamation would not be initiated until the 7th century under Edwin of Northumbria. After Angle settlement of Northern England, York was the Anglo-capital of Deira and one of the capitals when the kingdom united with Bernicia, later known as Northumbria.

By the early 7th century, York was an important royal centre for the Northumbrian kings, for it was here that Paulinus of York (later St Paulinus) came to set up his wooden church, the precursor of York Minster, and it was here that King Edwin of Northumbria was baptised in 627. The first Minster is believed to have been built in 627, although the location of the early Minster is a matter of dispute.

Throughout the succeeding centuries, York remained an important royal and ecclesiastical centre, the seat of a bishop, and later, from 735, of an archbishop. Very little about Anglian York is known and few documents survive. It is known that the building and rebuilding of the Minster was carried out, along with the construction of a thirty-altar church dedicated to Alma Sophia (Holy Wisdom), which may have been on the same site.

York became a centre of learning under Northumbrian rule, with the establishment of the library and school, the ancestor of St Peter's School. Alcuin, later adviser to Charlemagne, was its most distinguished pupil and then master.

Of this great royal and ecclesiastical centre, little is yet known archaeologically. Excavations on the Roman fortress walls have shown that they may have survived more or less intact for much of their circuit, and the Anglian Tower, a small square tower built to fill a gap in the Roman way, may be a repair of the Anglian period. The survival of the walls and gates shows that the Roman street pattern survived, at least in part, inside the fortress. Certainly excavations beneath York Minster have shown that the great hall of the Roman headquarters building still stood and was used until the 9th century.

By the 8th century York was an active commercial centre with established trading links to other areas of England, northern France, the Low Countries and the Rhineland. Excavations near the junction of the River Foss and River Ouse in Fishergate found buildings dating from the 7th and 9th century. These were located away from the Roman centre of the city may form a trading settlement that served the royal and ecclesiastical century. This and other discoveries indicate an occupation pattern during the 7th to 9th century that followed the line of the rivers, creating a long linear settlement along the River Ouse and extending along some of the River Foss.

=== Viking Jórvík ===
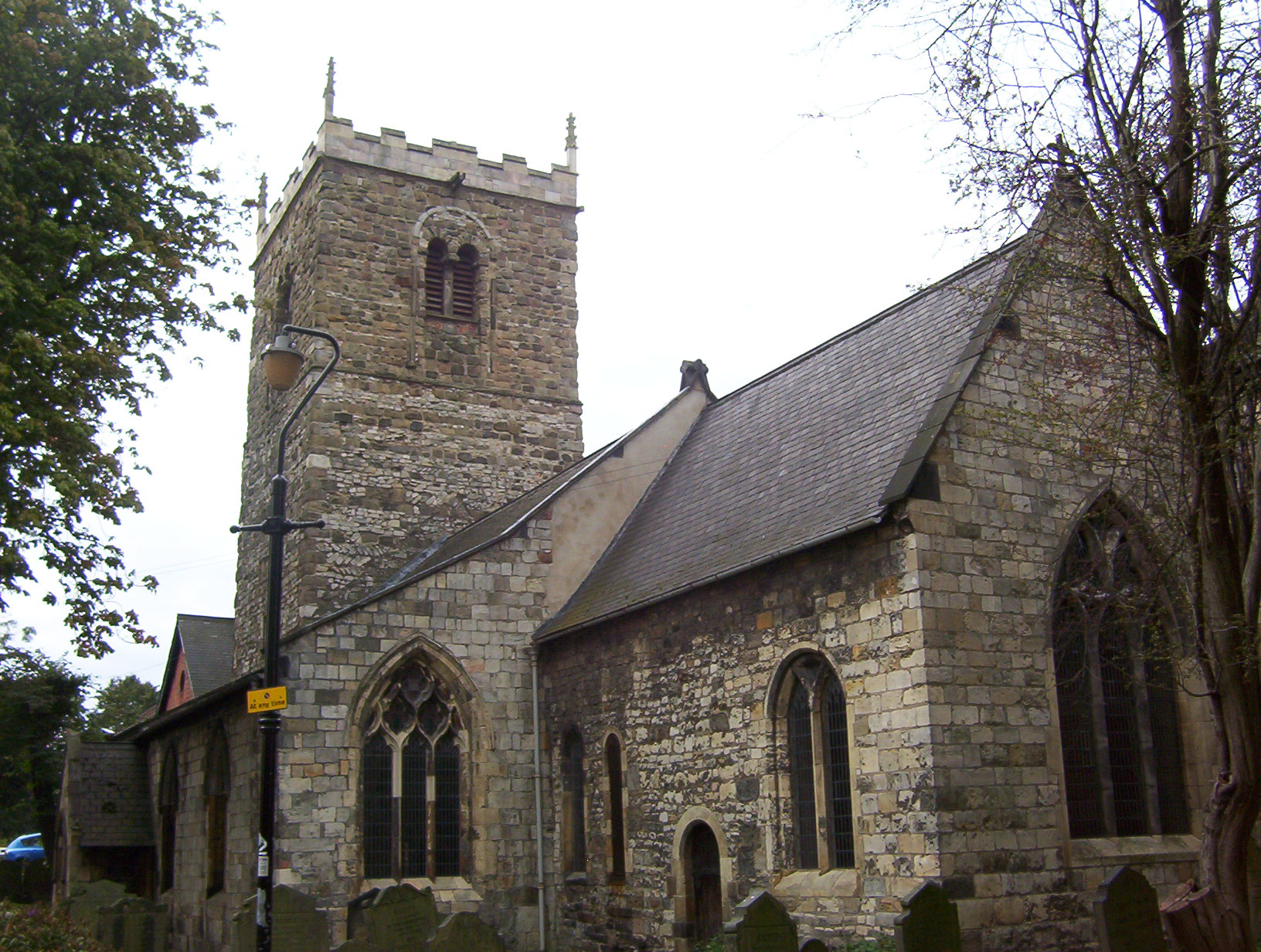
St Mary Bishophill Junior

In November 866 AD a large army of Danish Vikings, called the "Great Heathen Army", captured York, unopposed due to conflict in the Kingdom of Northumbria. The next year they held the city when the Northumbrians tried to retake it; the army left the same year putting a local puppet king in charge of York and the area around York they controlled. The army returned in 875 and its leader Halfdan took control of York. From York, Viking kings ruled an area, known to historians as "The Kingdom of Jorvik", with Danes migrating and settling in large numbers in the Kingdom and in York. In York the Old Norse placename Konungsgurtha, Kings Court, recorded in the late 14th century in relation to an area immediately outside the site of the porta principalis sinistra, the west gatehouse of the Roman encampment, perpetuated today as King's Square, perhaps indicates a Viking royal palace site based on the remains of the east gate of the Roman fortress. In 954 the last Viking king, Eric Bloodaxe, was expelled and his kingdom was incorporated in the newly consolidated Anglo-Saxon state.

A renowned scholar of this era was Wulfstan II, Archbishop of York.

Several churches were built in York during the Viking Age including St Olave's, built before 1055 on Marygate, which is dedicated to St. Olaf King of Norway and St Mary Bishophill Junior which has a 10th century tower whose height was increased in the early 11th century.

== Medieval ==
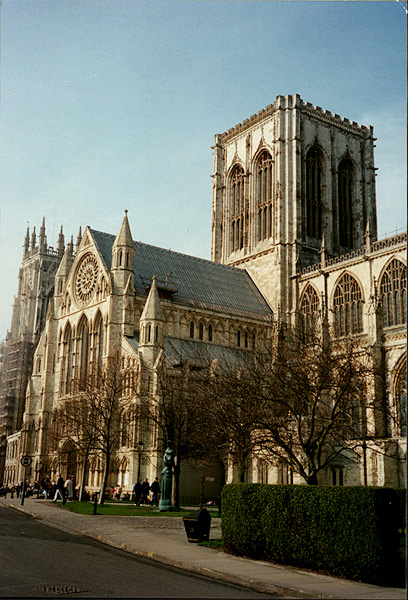
York Minster

Following the Norman Conquest of 1066, York was substantially damaged by the punitive harrying of the north (1069) launched by William the Conqueror in response to regional revolt. Two castles were erected in the city on either side of the River Ouse. In time York became an important urban centre as the administrative centre of the county of Yorkshire, as the seat of an archbishop, and at times in the later 13th and 14th centuries as an alternative seat of royal government. It was an important trading centre. Several religious houses were founded following the Conquest, including St Mary's Abbey and Holy Trinity Priory. The city as a possession of the crown also came to house a substantial Jewish community under the protection of the sheriff.

On 16 March 1190 a mob of townsfolk forced the Jews in York to flee into the castle keep (later replaced by Clifford's Tower), which was under the control of the sheriff. The castle was set on fire and the Jews were massacred. It is likely that various local magnates who were debtors of the Jews helped instigate this massacre or, at least, did nothing to prevent it. It came during a time of widespread attacks against Jews in Britain. The Jewish community in York did recover after the massacre and a Jewish presence remained in York until the expulsion of Jews from England in 1290.

Drawing of a medieval era street; one of the "Water Lanes" in York. They were demolished in 1852.

After the Battle of Bannockburn in 1314, the Vale of York became vulnerable to Scottish attacks by Robert the Bruce; that fear was realised with the Battle of Myton in 1319 and the Battle of Old Byland in 1322, following York's surroundings and suburban areas being heavily impacted during The Great Raid of 1322. The conflict ended with a great council at Bishopthorpe the following year.

York prospered during much of the later medieval era. Twenty-one medieval parish churches survive in whole or in part, though only eight of these are regularly used for worship. Many medieval era timber-framed buildings survive in the city. While Slum clearances in the 19th century removed some of the more decrepit ancient examples of medieval architecture in the city, such as the medieval Water Lanes, streets such as The Shambles still survive to this day. The Shambles mostly date from the later medieval era with many examples of timber-framed shops with overhanging upper floors. The street was originally occupied by butchers but is now a popular tourist attraction consisting of mostly souvenir shops. Some retain the outdoor shelves and the hooks on which meat was displayed. The medieval city walls, with their entrance gates, known as bars, encompassed virtually the entire city and survive to this day. The city was also designated as a county corporate, giving it effective county status.

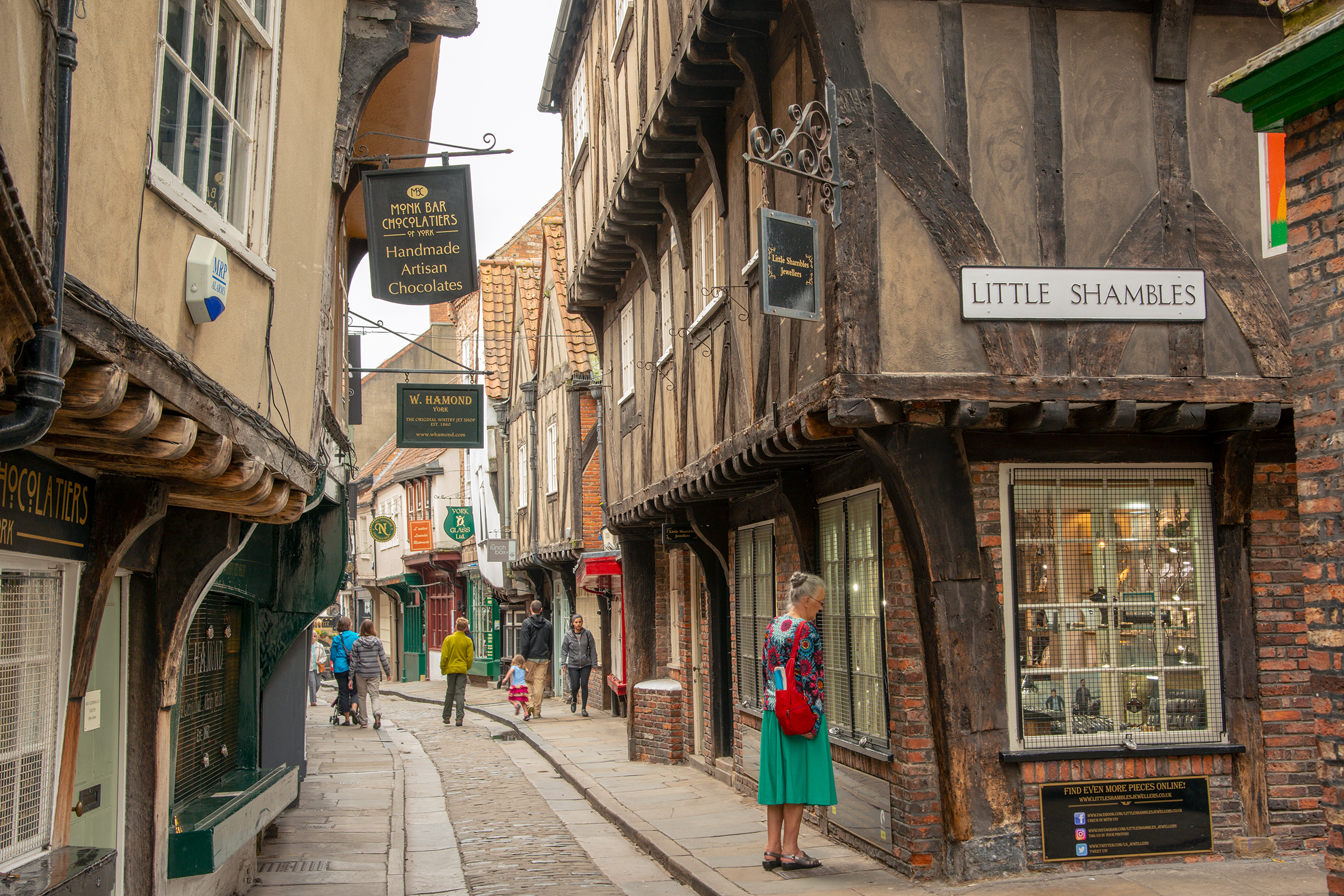
"The Shambles," a medieval street in York.

The later years of the 14th and the earlier years of the 15th centuries were characterised by particular prosperity. It is in this period that the York Mystery Plays, a regular cycle of religious pageants (or plays) associated with the Corpus Christi cycle and performed by the various craft guilds grew up. Among the more important personages associated with this period was Nicholas Blackburn senior, Lord Mayor in 1412 and a leading merchant. He is depicted with his wife Margaret Blackburn in glass in the (now) east window of All Saints' Church in North Street. There seems to have been economic contraction and a dwindling in York's regional importance in the period from the later 15th century. The construction of the city's new Guildhall around the middle of the century can be seen as an attempt to project civic confidence in the face of growing uncertainty. Brandsby-type ware and Humber ware ceramics were popular in the city at this time.

== Early modern ==
Few buildings of significance were put up in the century after the completion of the Minster in 1472, the exceptions being the completion of the King's Manor (which from 1537 to 1641 housed the Council of the North) and the rebuilding of the church of St. Michael le Belfrey, where Guy Fawkes was baptised in 1570.

During the dissolution of the monasteries all the monastic institutions in the City were closed including St. Leonards Hospital and in 1539 St. Mary's Abbey. In 1547, fifteen parish churches were closed, reducing their number from forty to twenty-five, a reflection of the decline in the city's population. Despite the English Reformation making the practice of Roman Catholicism illegal, a Catholic Christian community remained in York although this was mainly in secret. Its members included St. Margaret Clitherow who was executed in 1586 for harbouring a priest and Guy Fawkes who tried to blow up the Houses of Parliament in 1605.

Following his break with Parliament, King Charles I established his Court in York in 1642 for six months. Subsequently, during the English Civil War, the city was regarded as a Royalist stronghold and was besieged and eventually captured by Parliamentary forces under Lord Fairfax in 1644. After the war, York slowly regained its former pre-eminence in the North, and, by 1660, was the third-largest city in England after London and Norwich.

In 1686 the Bar Convent was founded, in secret due to anti-catholic Laws, making it the oldest surviving convent in England.

York elected two members to the Unreformed House of Commons.

The Judges Lodgings is a Grade I listed townhouse that was built between 1711 and 1726 and later used to house judges when they attended the quarterly sessions of the Assizes at York Castle.

On 22 March 1739 the highwayman Dick Turpin was convicted at the York Grand Jury House of horse-stealing, and was hanged at the Knavesmire on 7 April 1739. Turpin is buried in the churchyard of St George's Church, where his tombstone also shows his alias, John Palmer.

In 1740, the city's first hospital, York County Hospital, opened in Monkgate and it moved into larger premises in 1745. The building was funded by public subscription. The building was expanded on the same site in 1851, and finally closed in 1976 when York District Hospital was opened.

== Modern ==
York population 1801–2011

| Year | Pop. | ±% |
|---|---|---|
| 1801 | 24,080 | — |
| 1811 | 27,486 | +14.1% |
| 1821 | 30,913 | +12.5% |
| 1831 | 36,340 | +17.6% |
| 1841 | 40,337 | +11.0% |
| 1851 | 49,899 | +23.7% |
| 1861 | 58,632 | +17.5% |
| 1871 | 67,364 | +14.9% |
| 1881 | 76,097 | +13.0% |
| 1891 | 81,802 | +7.5% |
| 1901 | 90,665 | +10.8% |

| Year | Pop. | ±% |
|---|---|---|
| 1911 | 100,487 | +10.8% |
| 1921 | 106,278 | +5.8% |
| 1931 | 112,404 | +5.8% |
| 1941 | 123,227 | +9.6% |
| 1951 | 135,093 | +9.6% |
| 1961 | 144,585 | +7.0% |
| 1971 | 154,749 | +7.0% |
| 1981 | 158,170 | +2.2% |
| 1991 | 172,847 | +9.3% |
| 2001 | 181,131 | +4.8% |
| 2011 | 198,051 | +9.3% |

Source: Data for UK Census results for York UA

In 1796 Quaker William Tuke founded The Retreat, a hospital for the mentally ill, situated in the east of the city outside the city walls, which used moral treatment.

The Yorkshire Museum was opened in 1830, and the British Association for the Advancement of Science held its first meeting here in 1831.

Largely thanks to the efforts of "Railway King" George Hudson, York became a major centre for the railways during the 19th century, a status it maintained well into the 20th century. The Colliergate drill hall was completed in 1872 and the Tower Street drill hall was completed in 1885.

On 29 April 1942, York was bombed as part of the retaliatory Baedeker Blitz by the German Luftwaffe; 92 people were killed and hundreds injured. Buildings damaged in the raid included the Railway Station, Rowntree's Factory, St Martin-le-Grand Church, the Bar Convent and the Guildhall which was completely gutted and not restored until 1960.

During the Cold War the headquarters of the Number 20 Group, Royal Observer Corps was moved to the newly constructed York Cold War Bunker in the Holgate area of town. It was opened on 16 December 1961, was in operation until 1991, and was then turned into a museum owned by English Heritage. In 1971 York was made an army Saluting Station, firing gun salutes five times a year such as the Queen's Birthday. The date marked 1900 years of army in York. The University of York was launched on sites at Heslington and the King's Manor and took its first students in 1963. In 1975 the National Railway Museum was opened, near the centre of York.

In October and November 2000 the River Ouse rose and York experienced very severe flooding; over 300 houses were flooded though no-one was seriously hurt.

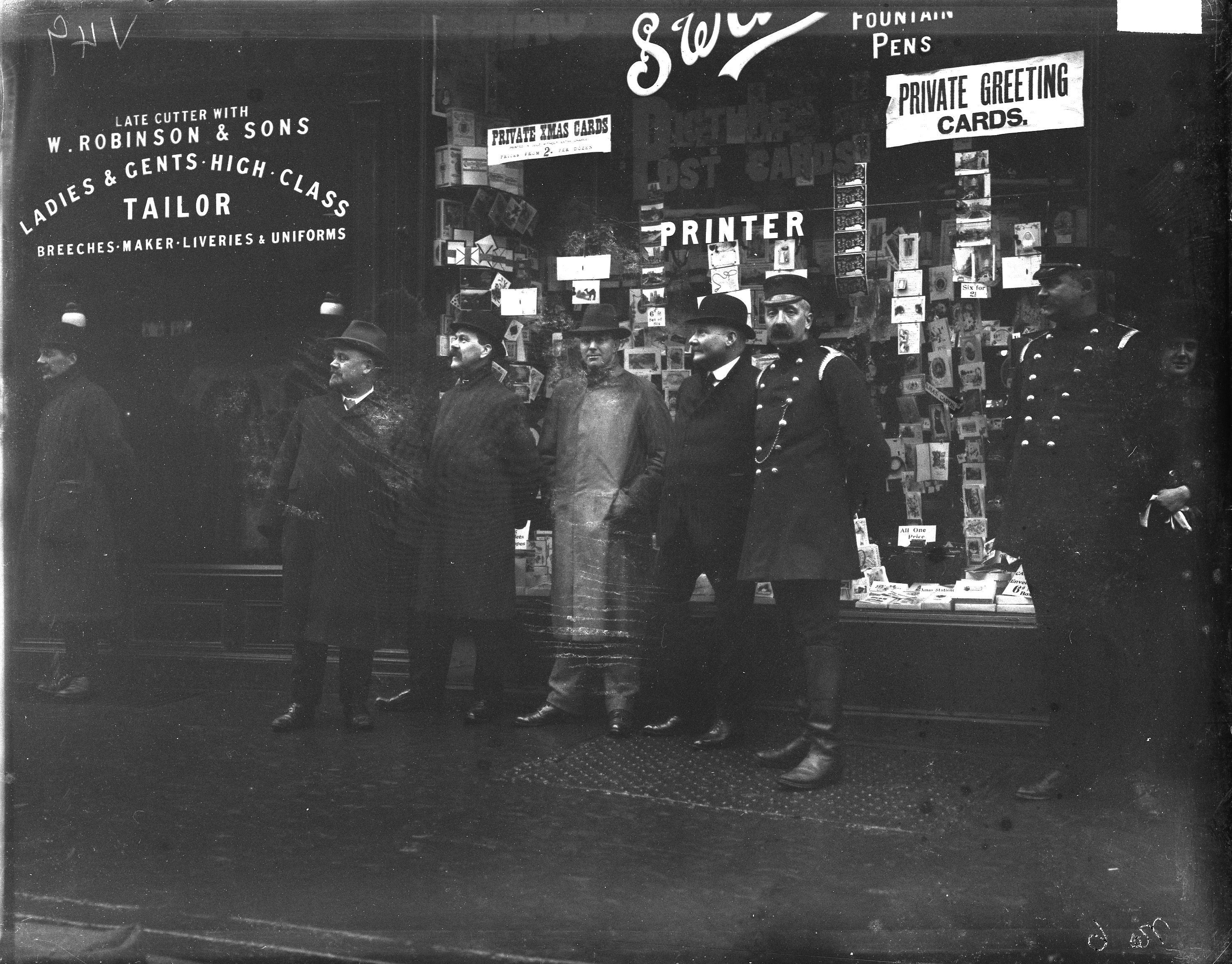
Men outside a shop in St Helen's Square around 1910

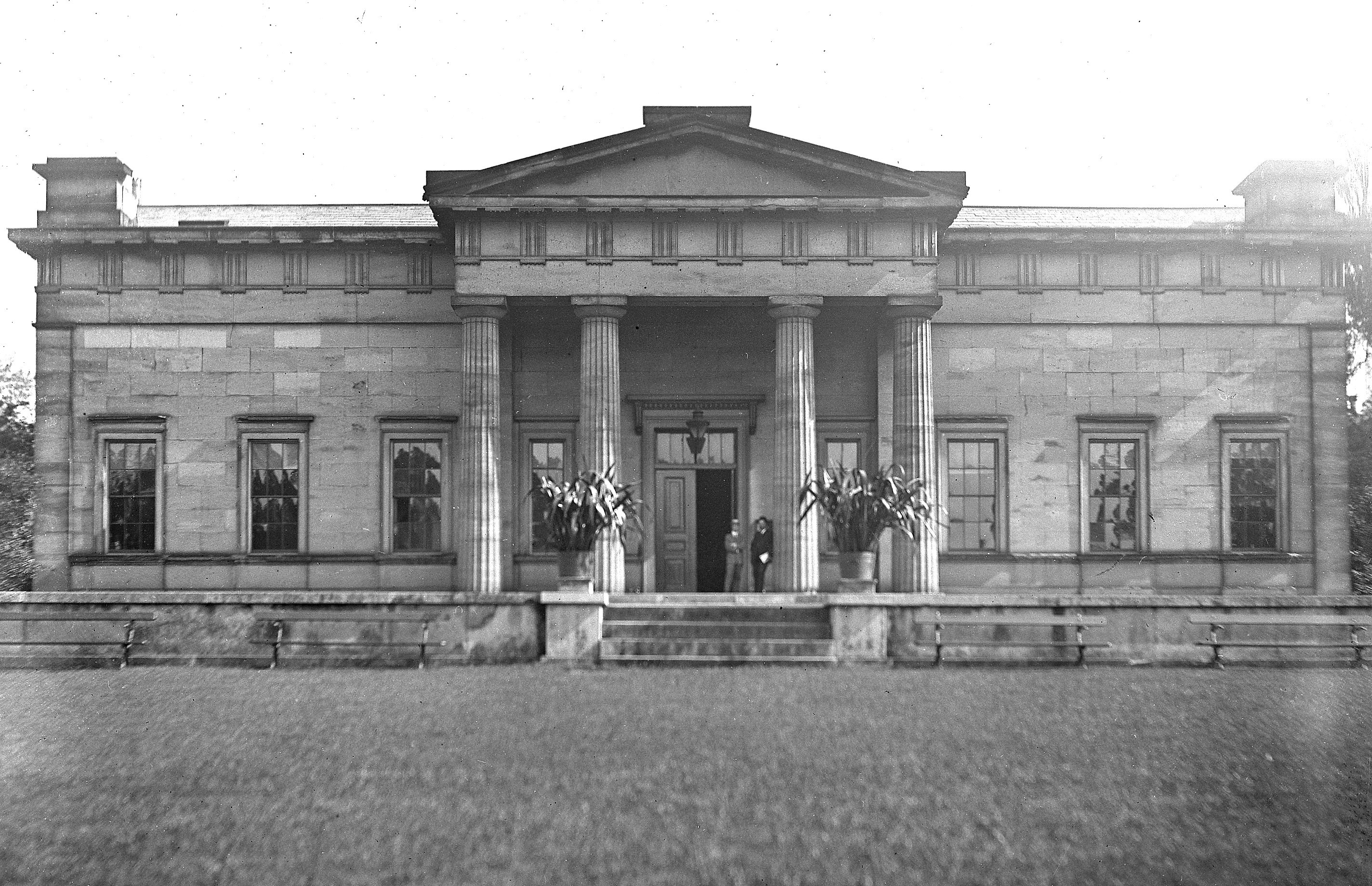
The Yorkshire Museum in around 1910

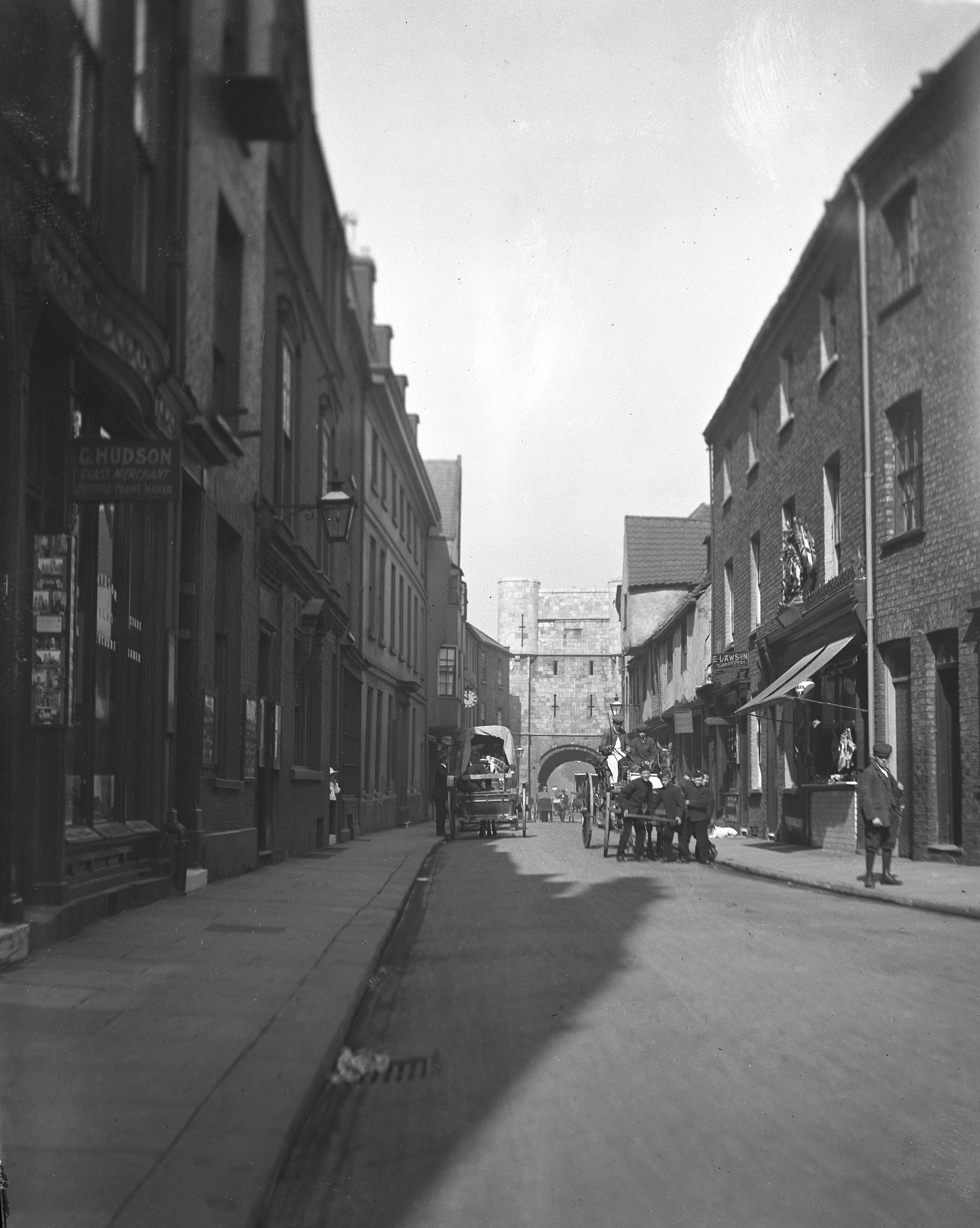
Low Petergate looking toward Bootham Bar in around 1910

== See also ==
- Timeline of York
- History of Yorkshire
- Medieval churches of York
- Religion in York
- Walker Iron Foundry
