= Kings Arms, York =

Listed pub in York, England

Kings Arms
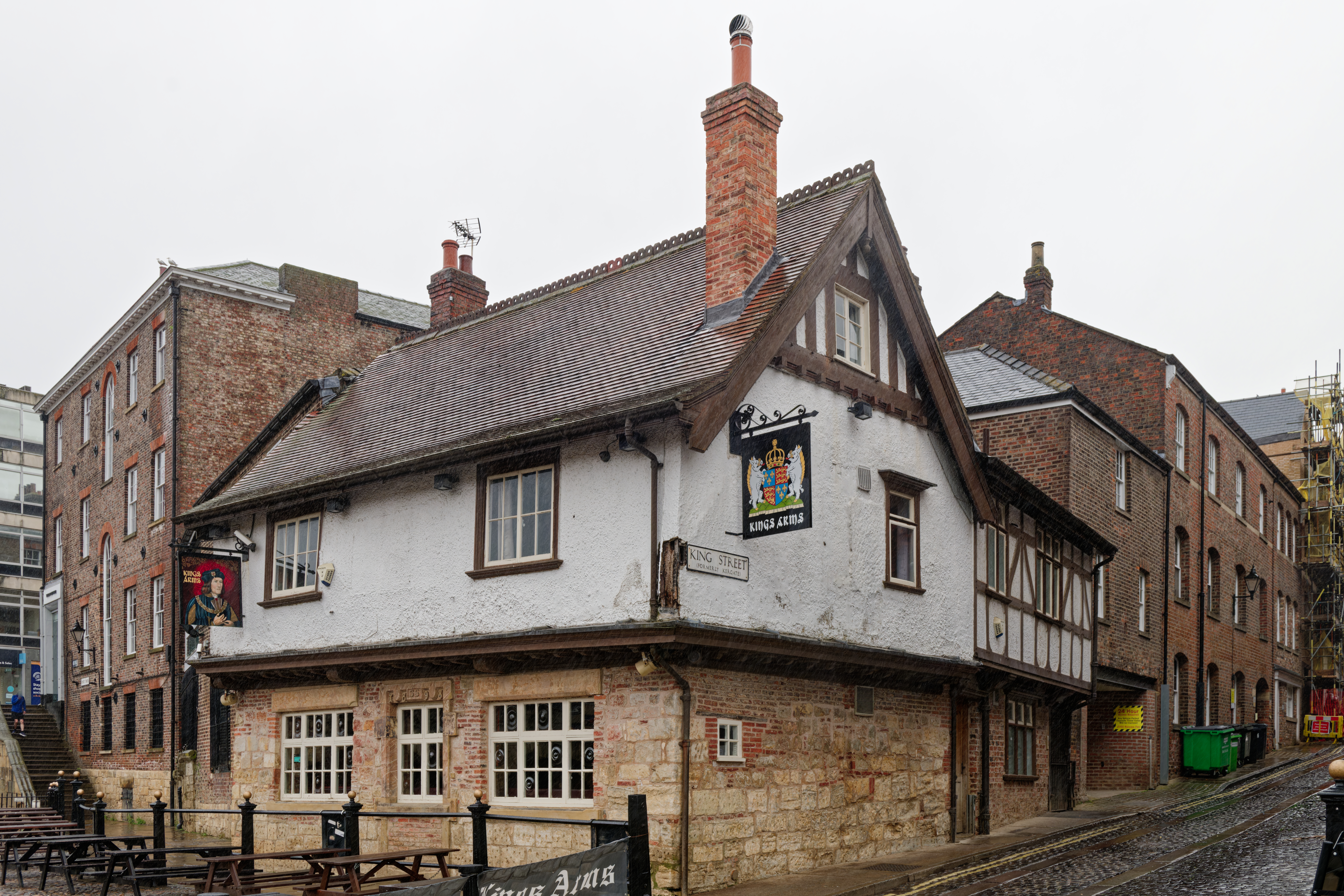
- The pub in 2024
- Former names: Ouse Bridge Inn

General information
- Type: Public house
- Location: 3 King's Staith, York, England
- Coordinates: 53.9571°N 1.0831°W
- Year built: Early 17th century
- Renovated: 1898 (partly rebuilt and extended); 1973–74 (modernised)
- Owner: Samuel Smith's

Listed Building – Grade II
- Official name: The Kings Arms public house
- Designated: 24 June 1983
- Reference no.: 1257523

The Kings Arms is a public house standing by the River Ouse in the city centre of York, England.

The building lies across King's Staith from the river, at its corner with King Street. It is the only surviving structure that formed part of First Water Lane, a medieval street demolished during a slum-clearance programme in 1852 and rebuilt as King Street. A road sign on the building reads "King Street (formerly Kergate)", acknowledging the original medieval name of First Water Lane.

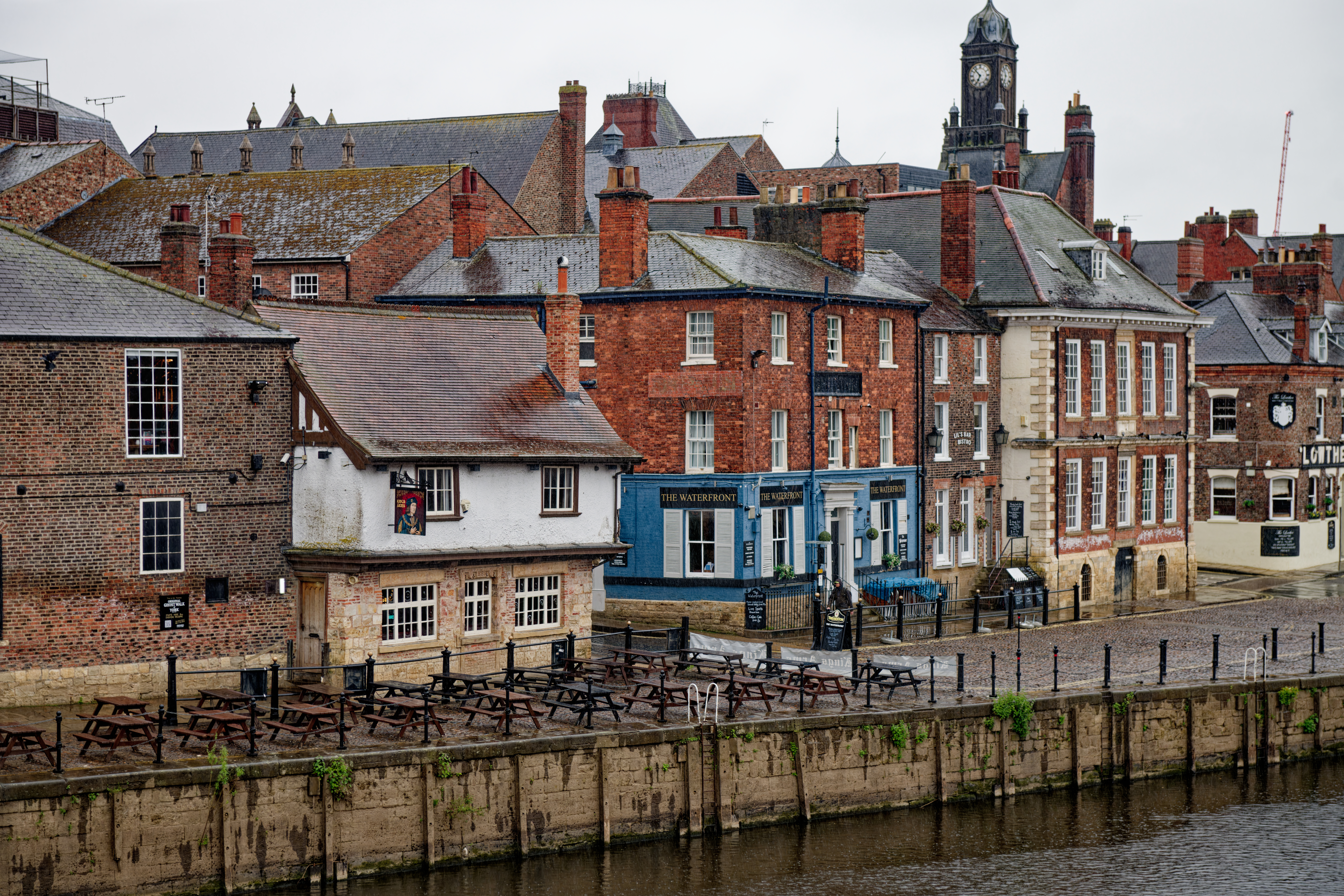
View of the pub from Ouse Bridge

It was built in the early 17th century, with the upper floor and north and east walls timber-framed. The south and west walls are particularly thick, providing some protection against flooding, and are constructed of brick and stone, some of which was reused from medieval buildings. The building originally had no fireplaces or internal walls, and is therefore believed to have been constructed as a warehouse or custom house for trade coming up the river.

The building was recorded as the "Kings Arms" pub by 1795, but in 1867 it was renamed as the "Ouse Bridge Inn", after the nearby Ouse Bridge. By 1898, it was owned by the Samuel Smith Old Brewery. The brewery renovated it with new doors and windows, and the rear wing facing King Street appears to have been completely rebuilt, with the north and east walls reconstructed in brick. In 1973, the pub was renovated again, and the "Kings Arms" name was reinstated. The pub was Grade II listed in 1983. As of June 2025, the freehold is still owned by Samuel Smith's.

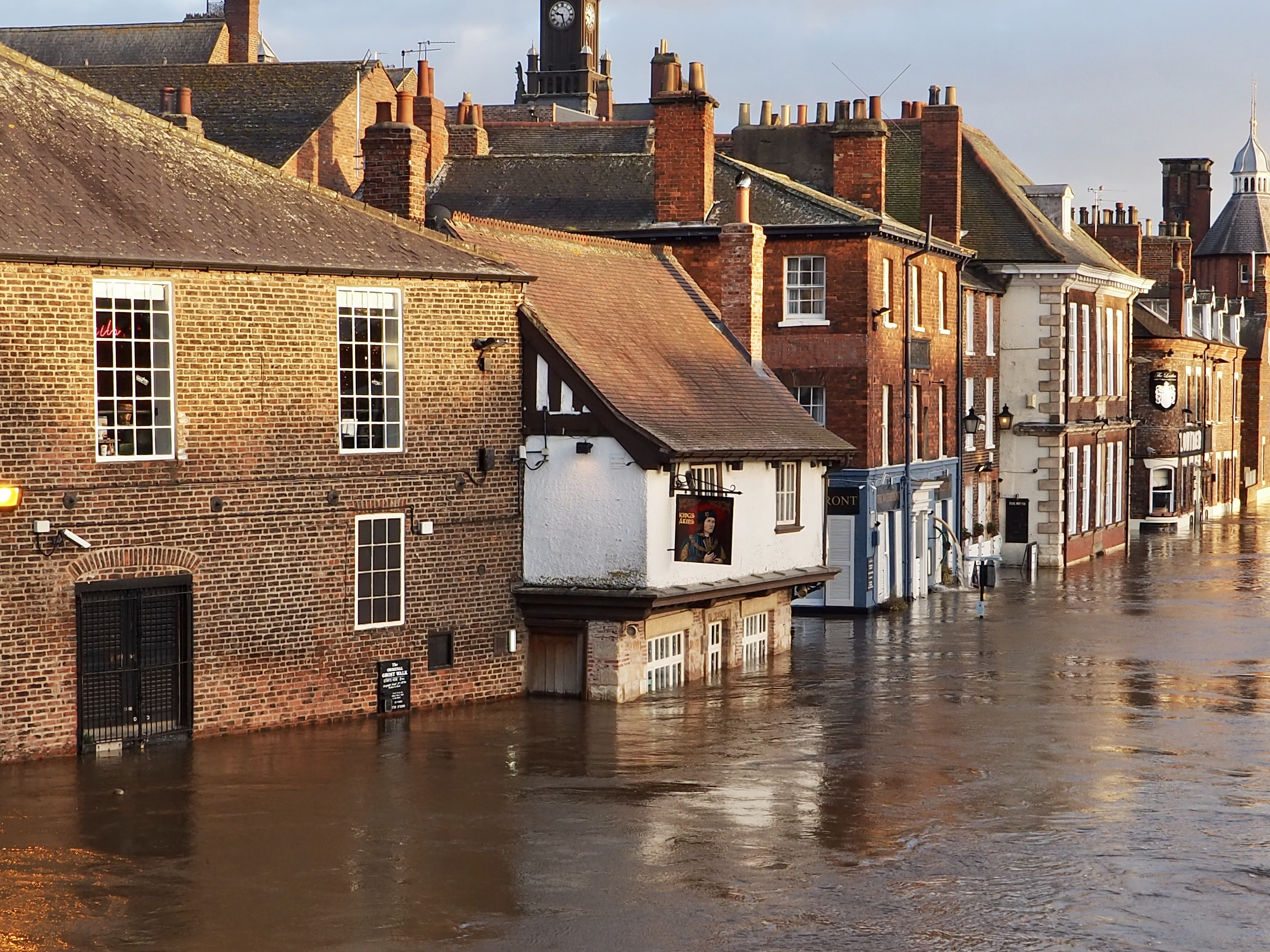
The pub during a flood, in 2022

The pub floods, on average, four times a year, and does not hold flood insurance. Historically, it would remain open for regulars even when flooded, but this is no longer permitted, as the river water may be contaminated. In 1982, the brewery introduced a new flood protocol: a flood gate is placed across the front door, and customers are served in the back bar. Once the floodwaters reach the back door, the pub is closed, and all the fixtures and fittings can be dismantled and stored upstairs. The beer and electrics are kept upstairs and therefore are not damaged, even when floodwaters rise 4.5 metres (15 ft) above usual river levels. A chart on the wall marks historic flood heights, the highest being in 2000, when floodwater nearly reached the ceiling of the bar.

The pub sign depicts Richard III. A legend claims that the bodies of executed criminals were laid out in the building before being hanged from Ouse Bridge.

== See also ==
- Listed buildings in York (within the city walls, southern part)
