= King's Staith =

Street in York, England

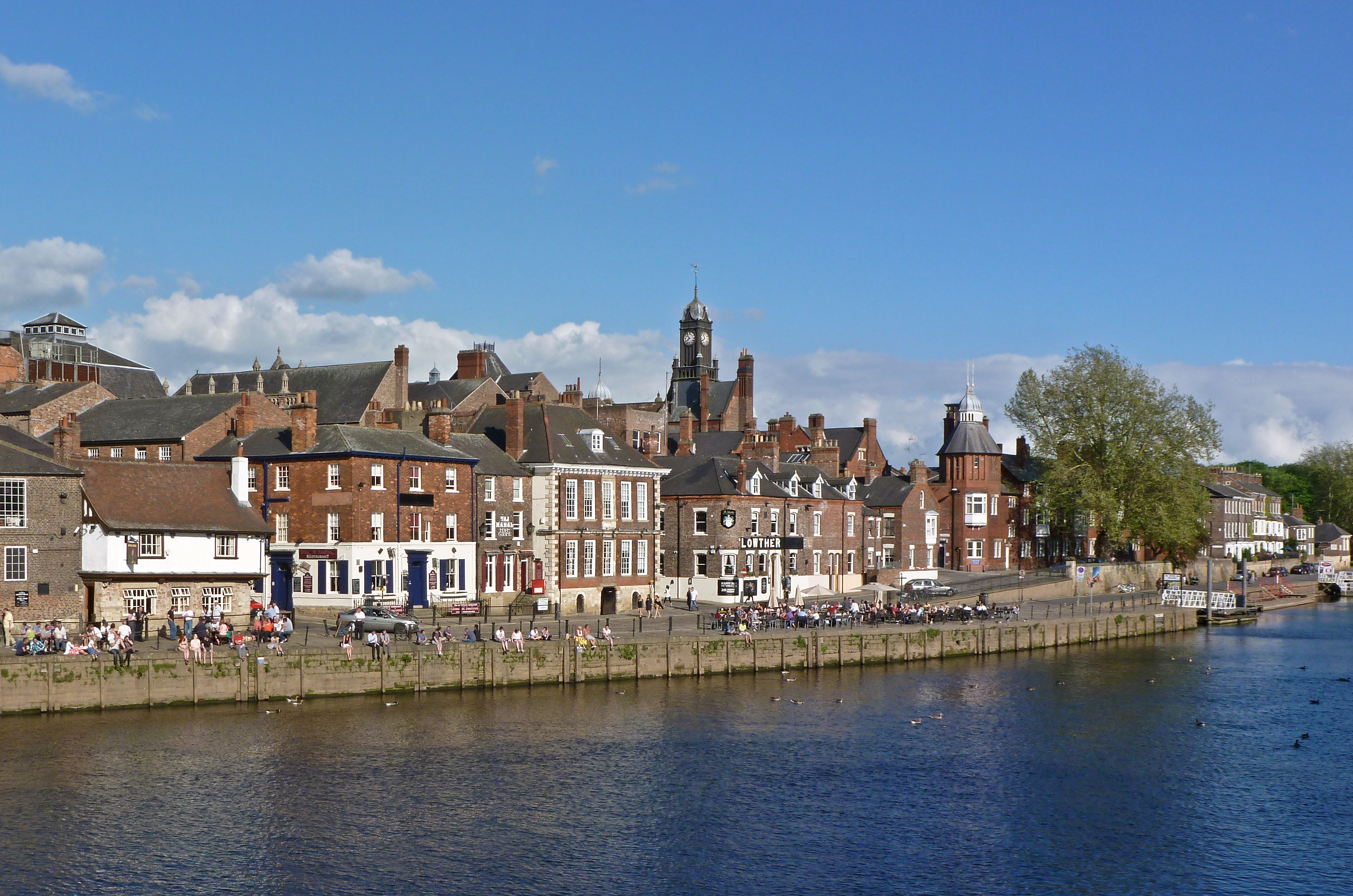
- King's Staith, from Queen's Staith
- Location within York
- Location: York, England
- Coordinates: 53°57′24″N 1°4′58.3″W
- North west end: Ouse Bridge
- South east end: New Walk

King's Staith is a street in the city centre of York, in England.

== History ==
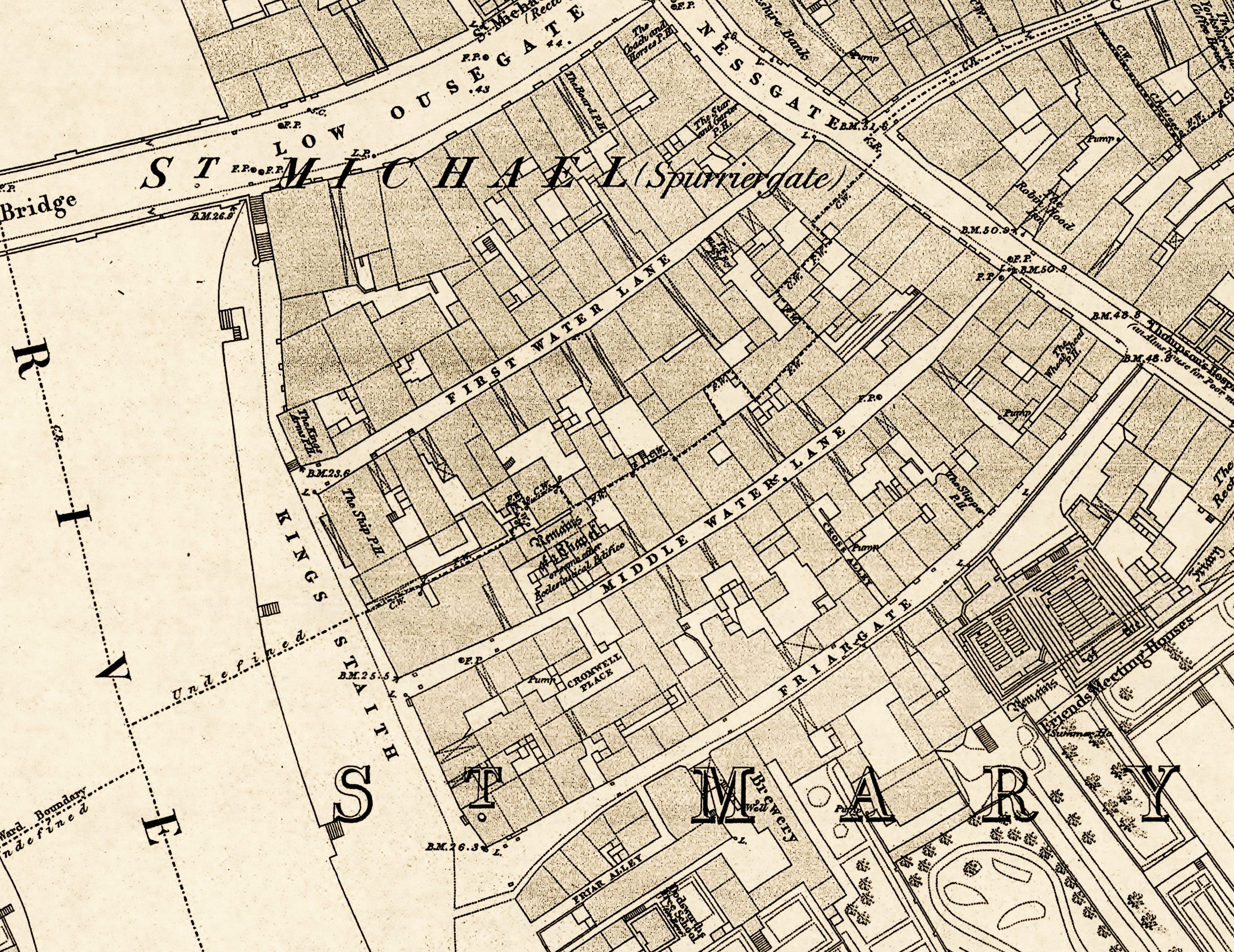
1852 Map showing Kings Staith and the medieval Water Lanes that led down to it prior to their demolition that same year.

The street was constructed in 1366 as the main quay for the city, replacing various small timber wharves. Its name has been connected to royals visiting the city in the 14th century, but the name was not recorded until the 17th century.

The King's Staith formed the water front end of three long, narrow medieval streets known as The Water Lanes. These lanes were demolished as part of a slum clearance program in 1852 but the three modern streets King Street, Cumberland Street and Lower Friargate follow roughly the same layout. Several buildings on King's Staith survived the clearances and remain to this day, including Cumberland House and the Kings Arms Pub which, from early-17th century formed the water front end of First Water Lane.

Pudding Holes, a public washing site, lay at the southern end of the street, just north of the walls of the York Franciscan Friary. In the 17th century, the street was extended beyond its walls. Nikolaus Pevsner claims that the friary's remaining waterside wall lies on the street, although the City of York Council argue that the friary has no visible remains. In 1774, the street was raised, and in 1821, new steps were constructed at its northern end, leading up to the new Ouse Bridge, replacing older steps known as "Salthole Grese" or the "Grecian Steps".

The street remained the city's main quay until the 20th century, and it is currently used by pleasure boats. Its contains some outside dining areas, and most of the buildings are occupied by pubs and restaurants. The street frequently floods, and the floodwater levels are marked inside the King's Arms pub.

== Layout and architecture ==
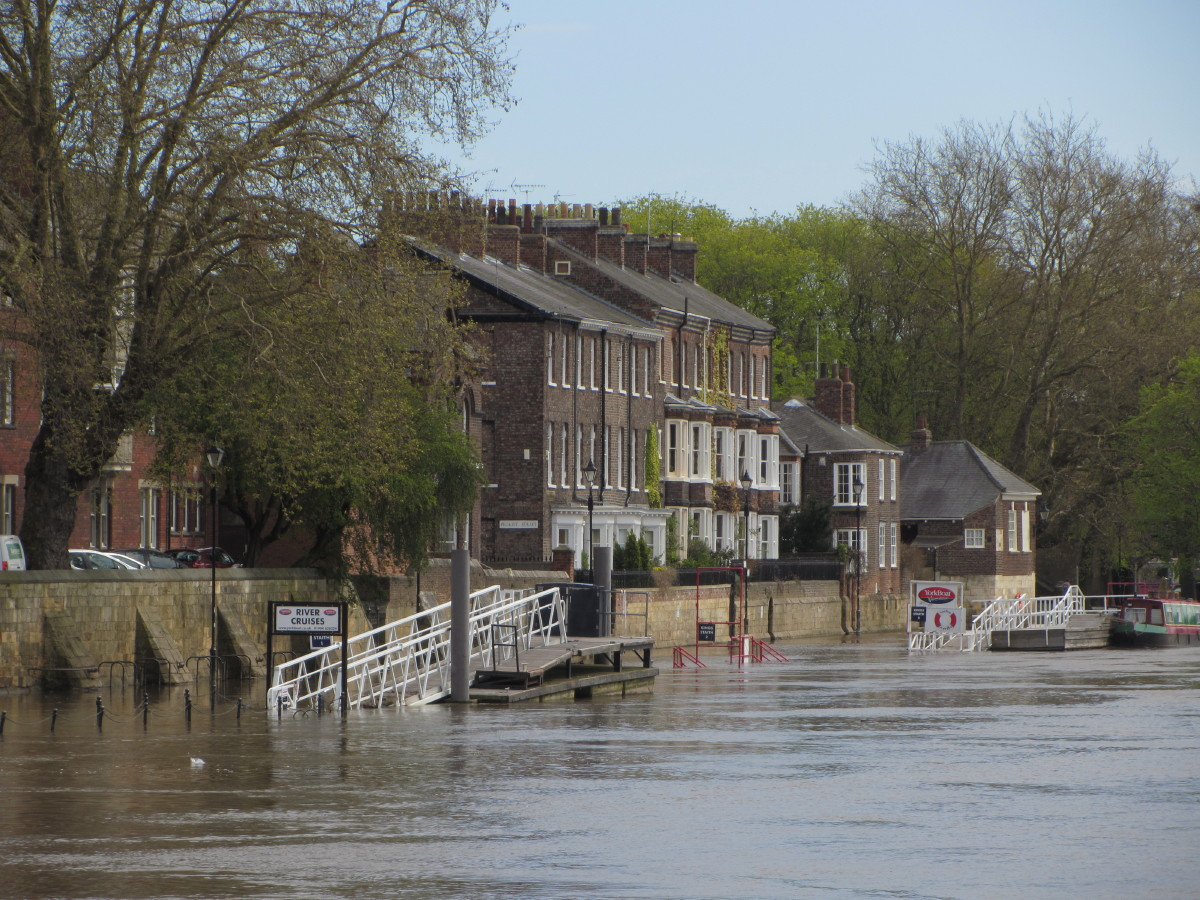
Floods on the southern part of King's Staith

The street runs south-east, from Ouse Bridge, to Davy Tower on the York City Walls, beyond which its route continues as the New Walk path through Tower Gardens. King Street, Cumberland Street and Lower Friargate lead off its north-eastern side, and steps connect it to Peckitt Street.

All the buildings on the street lie on the north-eastern side. Notable structures include the Kings Arms pub, with 17th-century origins; the 19th-century 7 King's Staith; and Cumberland House, a Grade I listed building constructed in about 1710.
