= Religion in York =

Stained-glass window of the Pilgrimage, York Minster

Religion in York can be traced back to the city's foundation in Roman times with evidence of York's first Christian community dating from this period.

In 1086, the Domesday Book listed eight churches and a Minster (not the current building). The number had declined to 39 by 1428 due to taxation; 19 medieval churches are in use today.

== History ==
=== Roman ===
==== Polytheism ====
A range of evidence about Roman religious beliefs of the people of Eboracum have been found including altars to Mars, Hercules, Jupiter and Fortune, while phallic amulets are the most commonly found type of good luck charm. In terms of number of reference the most popular deities were the spiritual representation (genius) of Eboracum and the Mother Goddess, there is also evidence of local or regional deities. Evidence showing the worship of eastern deities has also been found during excavations in York. For example, evidence of the Mithras cult, which was popular among the military, has been found including a sculpture showing Mithras slaying a bull and a dedication to Arimanius, the god of evil in the Mithraic tradition. Another example is the dedication of a temple to Serapis a Hellenistic-Egyptian God by the Commander of the Sixth Legion.

==== Christianity ====
There was also a Christian community in Eboracum although it is unknown when this was first formed and in archeological terms there is virtually no record of it. The first evidence of this community is a document noting the attendance of Bishop Eborius of Eboracum at the Council of Arles in 314. The Episcopal see at Eboracum was called Eboracensis in Latin and Bishops from the See also attended the First Council of Nicaea in 325, the Council of Sardica, and the Council of Ariminum.

On 16 March 1190, a mob of townsfolk forced the Jews in York to flee into Clifford's Tower, which was under the control of the sheriff. The castle was set on fire and the Jews were massacred. It is likely that various local magnates who were debtors of the Jews helped instigate this massacre or, at least, did nothing to prevent it. It came during a time of widespread attacks against Jews in Britain. The Jewish community in York did recover after the massacre and a Jewish presence remained in York until the expulsion of Jews from England took place in 1290.

In the intervening years, though, the pressure on the Jews of Yorkshire increased, especially by those who were in debt to them. A deed of 1249, for instance, between the Anglo-Norman Hamond de Levet (Levett) and several donors to Yorkshire's Roche Abbey, required the donors to put the "Hebrew letter with their seal," acknowledging that the Abbey had likely borrowed money from Jewish lenders in York.

Religion in York 2001
UK Census 2001	York	Yorkshire	England
Christian	74.42%	73.07	71.74%
No religion	16.57%	14.09%	14.59%
Muslim	0.58%	3.81%	3.1%
Buddhist	0.21%	0.14%	0.28%
Hindu	0.19%	0.32%	1.11%
Jewish	0.11%	0.23%	0.52%
Sikh	0.05%	0.38%	0.67%
Other religions	0.30%	0.19%	0.29%
Religion not stated	7.57%	7.77%	7.69%

== Church of England ==
Located in York are the Mother Church, York Minster, and administrative centre of the Church of England's Diocese of York, as well as Bishopthorpe Palace the official residence of the Archbishop of York the second highest ranking cleric the Church. There are 32 Church of England churches within the area of the City of York.

== Roman Catholic ==
York is part of the Central Deanery of the Diocese of Middlesbrough and has eight Roman Catholic Churches and one separate shrine to St. Margaret Clitherow, where masses are held, located in The Shambles. Masses are also celebrated at the University Catholic Chaplaincy, based at More House. The oldest active Catholic institution in the city is the Bar Convent, which was founded in 1686. The oldest active parish is that of St. Wilfrid which was formed in 1710. The current Oratory church in Duncombe Place was built in 1862–4 to a design by architect George Goldie. The oldest extant Catholic church is that of St George, which was built in 1850 to a design by architect Joseph Hansom.

All Saints RC School (on Nunnery Lane and Mill Mount)is the only Catholic Secondary School in the city and the largest in the county at large, it was the first catholic school to be designed for the education of girls, however is now co-educational but is still an integral part of the Catholic community in the city.

== Religious Society of Friends ==
There are three meeting houses of the Religious Society of Friends in York although meetings are held at other venues including The Retreat and University of York.

York has a long association with the Religious Society of Friends, known as the Quakers, and founded two schools in the city Bootham School in 1823 and The Mount in 1831. The Retreat is a large Quaker mental hospital, situated in the east of the city outside the city walls. It was founded in 1796 by William Tuke; over the next century his son Henry Tuke, grandson Samuel Tuke and great-grandson Daniel Hack Tuke also devoted themselves to mental health reform, continuing to reform The Retreat and publishing a number of works on the subject. The York-born Quaker chocolate entrepreneurs and social reformers Joseph Rowntree and Benjamin Seebohm Rowntree left an indelible mark on the city, through both their business interests and their philanthropy. They built the village of New Earswick to provide quality affordable housing for their employees, contributed to the building of York Public Library and the created Rowntree Park. The four Rowntree Trusts, funded from the Rowntree legacies, are based in York.

== Methodists ==
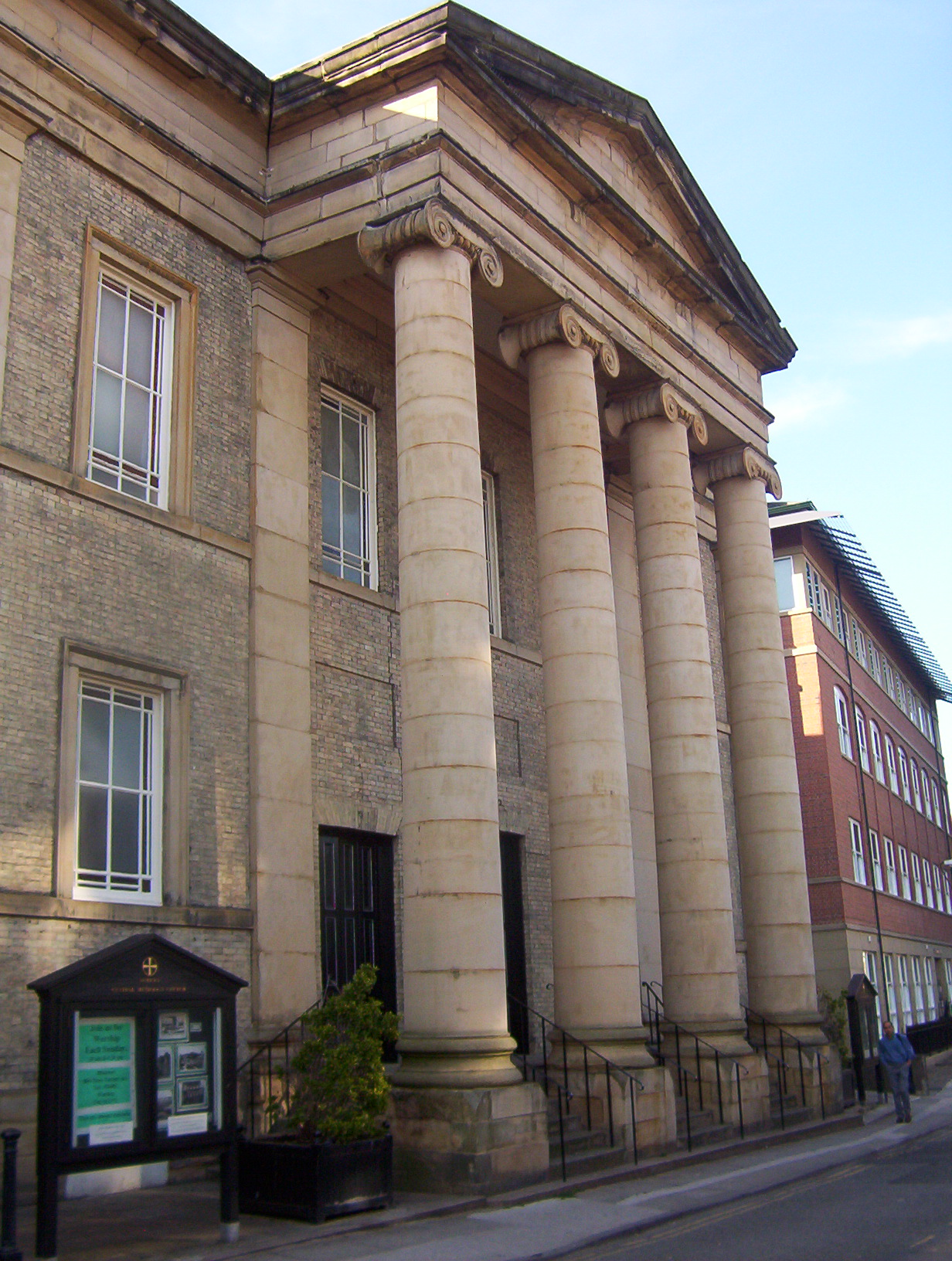
York Central Methodist Church, St Saviourgate

The York Methodist Circuit is part of the York and Hull District and comprises 36 churches and communities across the city of York and the surrounding area.

Elmfield College (1864–1932) was an important Primitive Methodist college, in Heworth, near York.

In 1932 the York and Whitby District was formed following the unification of the Primitive, Wesleyan and United Methodist churches. This was superseded by the York and Hull District in 1957 as part of a nationwide re-modelling of Methodist Districts.

== Unitarianism ==
A Unitarian chapel is located on St Saviorgate near the town centre. Its origins are found in the building of a chapel on that site in 1689.

== Judaism ==
York had a significant Jewish population during the Middle Ages, but the massacre of 1190 constituted such a calamity that a question remains as to whether Jewish authorities ever issued an official ban precluding Jews from residing in the city. No Jewish community of note existed until the late 19th century when a few European Jews settled in the town and formed a congregation that met regularly in Aldwalk. By 1968, the community had dwindled with only 45 Jews being recorded and the synagogue formally closed in 1975. In 2014, a Liberal community was established.

== Islam ==
As of 2007, there was one mosque in York which also contained a UK Islamic Mission Islamic centre. This has since been replaced by a purpose-built mosque which opened in 2018.

== Buddhism ==
Various Buddhist traditions are represented in and around York.

== See also ==
- History of York
- Medieval churches of York
- Diocese of York
- Southlands Methodist Church
