= The Water Lanes =

Three medieval streets in York, England

Coordinates: 53°57′25″N 1°04′56″W

Pencil drawing with wash highlights of First Water Lane, Drawing on paper

The Water Lanes were three medieval streets in the city of York in the north of England. They led from Castlegate road down to the waterfront of the River Ouse. The Lanes were similar in appearance to the Shambles with the jettied buildings hanging over the street. In the 19th century, they were known as the First Lane, Middle Lane and Far Water Lane, although in medieval times they had been known as Kergate, Thrush Lane and Hertergate. They were demolished in 1852.

== History ==
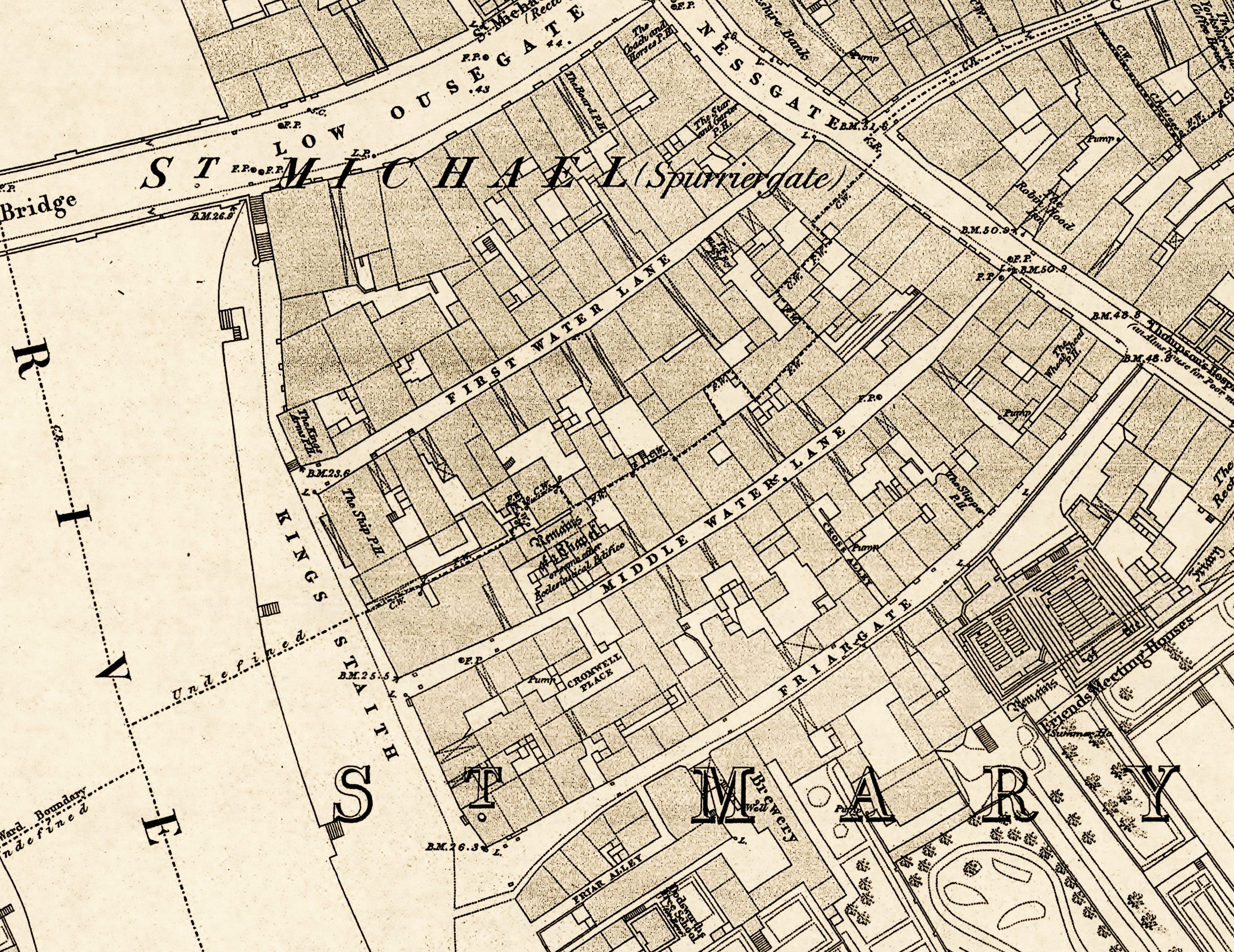
The Water Lanes as seen on a map from a survey of them from 1849.

The three Water Lanes were historically known by various names. In the 12th century, First Water Lane was referred to as Kergate, Middle Water Lane as Thursegayle, and Far Water Lane as Hertergate. The old names for the Water Lanes had a mixture of native old northern English with Old Scandinavian construction to them. With few exceptions, the names of streets in early medieval York contained strong Viking influences. The suffix “gate” derives from the Old Norse word ‘gata’ meaning street. The name Kergate came from the old west Scandinavian word "kiarr" meaning ‘marshy, low-lying ground'. The street subsequently became Cargate before being called First Water Lane. The site of First Water Lane is now occupied by King Street. Thursegayle later became more anglicised to Thrush Lane before being called either Middle Water Lane or Second Water Lane somewhat interchangeably. It is now occupied by Cumberland Street. Hertergate came from the word “hiartar”, a west Scandinavian word meaning ‘a hart or stag’. It was later renamed as Far Water Lane and is now occupied by the street Friargate.

The lanes held great appeal for artists, who enjoyed capturing the long, narrow streets and the ramshackle buildings. In particular the artist John Ruskin and his associates did several drawings of the streets in Victorian times as well as the early Victorian pioneer of photography William Henry Fox Talbot. A detailed layout of the Water Lanes and the floorplans of the individual buildings on them was recorded on a map of York that surveyed the area between 1849 and 1851 just before their demolition. This map provides an invaluable highly detailed information on the buildings that stood here.

The Lanes had associations with poverty, crime and immorality dating back to the fifteenth century. They often had the highest rates of poverty and crime in the City. The Lanes were known for their unsanitary conditions and much of York's cholera problems started in these streets. Attempts were made over many decades to look at either improving or demolishing the lanes. The police reports from the area made constant reference to the problems of crime in the streets, with offences ranging from murder to mugging, and even a case of a lady who was having her fortune told in a house on Water Lane, who found that her money had been taken from her during the reading.

By the 19th century, the Lanes had become notable slums. In February 1830, City Commissioners looked seriously at the "plan of the projected New Street from Low Ousegate, across the Water Lanes, and to the present entrance to the Castle". Although it obtained support, no firm action was decided for the area. The fact that a tenth of those who died in the York cholera epidemic of 1832 lived in the three Water Lanes spurred on the argument in support of demolishing them. Improvement commissioners in the 1840s discovered that the toilets facilities for the residents were nearly non-existent, noting that "the inhabitants have to use those of their neighbours by stealth or go into the street". After continued debate, in the 1850s the City Corporation decided that the lanes should be demolished, although work didn't finish for around twenty years. During a meeting of York City Council in 1851 when the new road across the lanes was being discussed, one person noted that "the purpose of clearing away an immense amount of property which, they would all admit harboured a class of persons they would all desire to see out of the Water Lanes".

== Demolition ==
In a bid to solve this problem, the Corporation of York took the decision in 1852 to clear them altogether. The first clearances began in this year and First Water Lane was widened and renamed as King Street. However, full-scale clearance of the Lanes did not begin until the Castlegate Improvement Scheme of 1875, which led to the construction of Clifford Street in 1881 and the final removal of the majority of the remaining slum dwellings of the Lanes. The modern road Friargate, leading to Castlegate, follows the route of Far Water Lane. Municipal buildings were established on the street, including, York's first library, York Magistrates Court, the Liberal Club and a new police station and fire station. After the demolition, many former residents were forced to move to other already overcrowded areas of the city such as the Hungate and Walmgate districts where their arrival exacerbated conditions. This and placed them once more in the sights of sanitary inspectors and city councils, who went about demolishing large parts of these areas too.

The demolition lasted over quite a number of years and, while most of the street is gone now, there remain a few structures still extant that formed parts of the Water Lanes, namely, the King's Staith, which was the water front that the lanes opened out onto. Several buildings on King's Staith survived the clearances and remain to this day, including Cumberland House and the Kings Arms Pub which, from early-17th century formed the water front end of First Water Lane and still stands to this day. Next to the Kings Arms Pub at the other side of the water front opening of Kings Street, there is another Pub called The Ship, which was a large Tudor building that formed the opening of First Water Lane, before being rebuilt in 1851 as part of the first clearance of the Water Lanes to widen the street to create King Street. This Tudor building can be seen in two photographs taken shortly before its demolition.

== Gallery ==
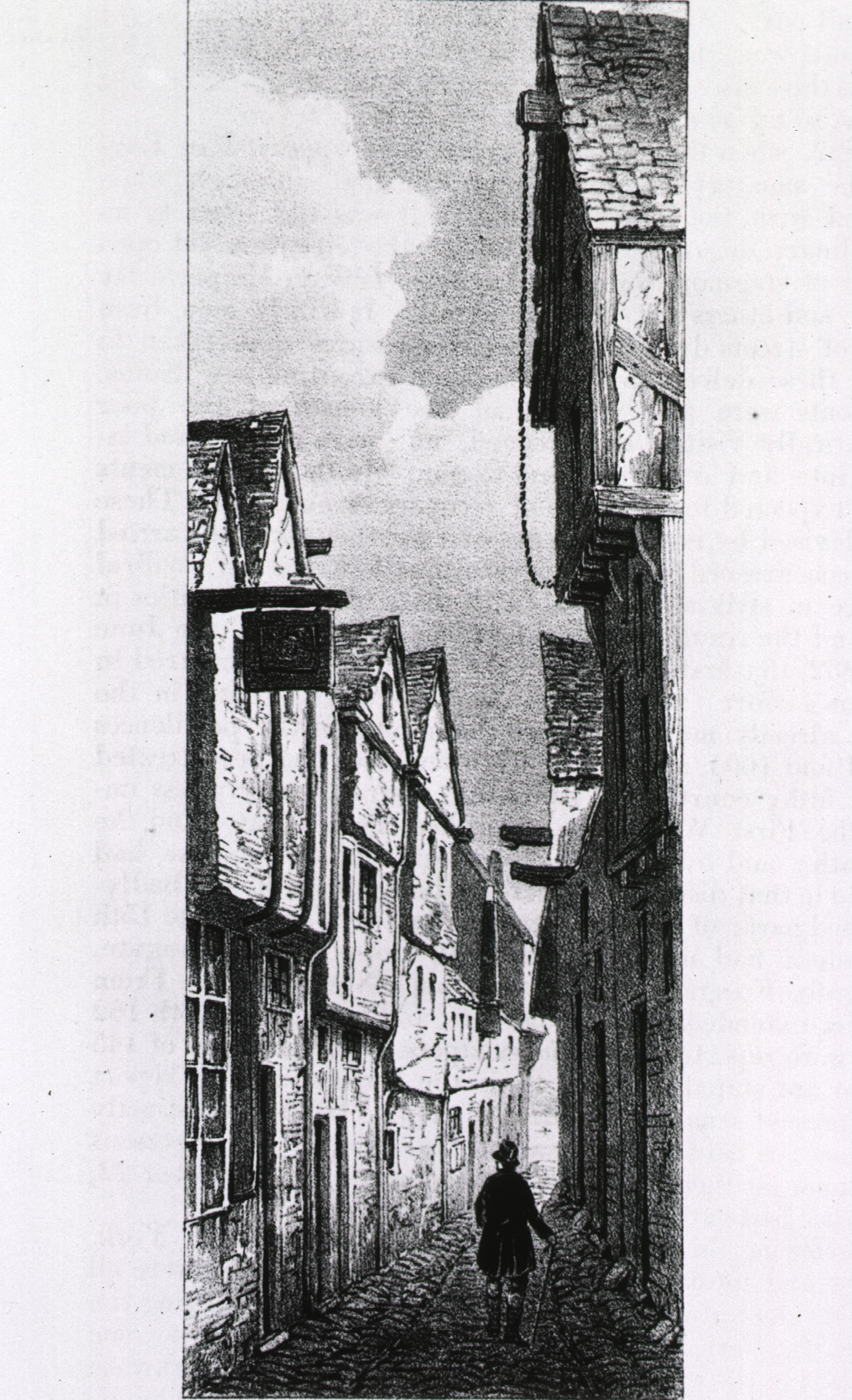
The First Water Lane in York in 1844 with a man walking down the lane, between rows of closely built houses.

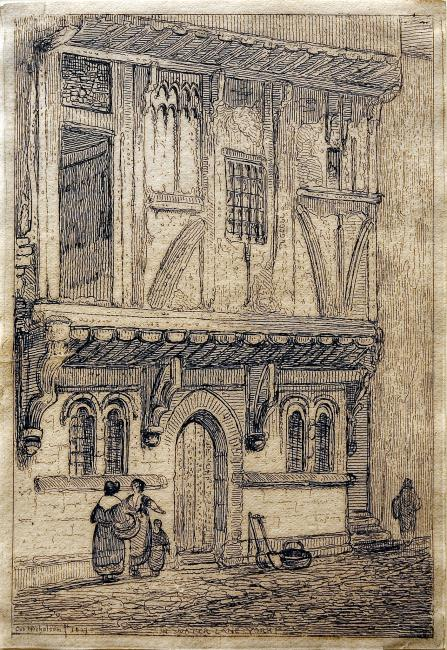
Etching of a half-timbered house in middle Water Lane York in 1827 (now Cumberland Street). Two women and a child stand in the street in the left foreground.

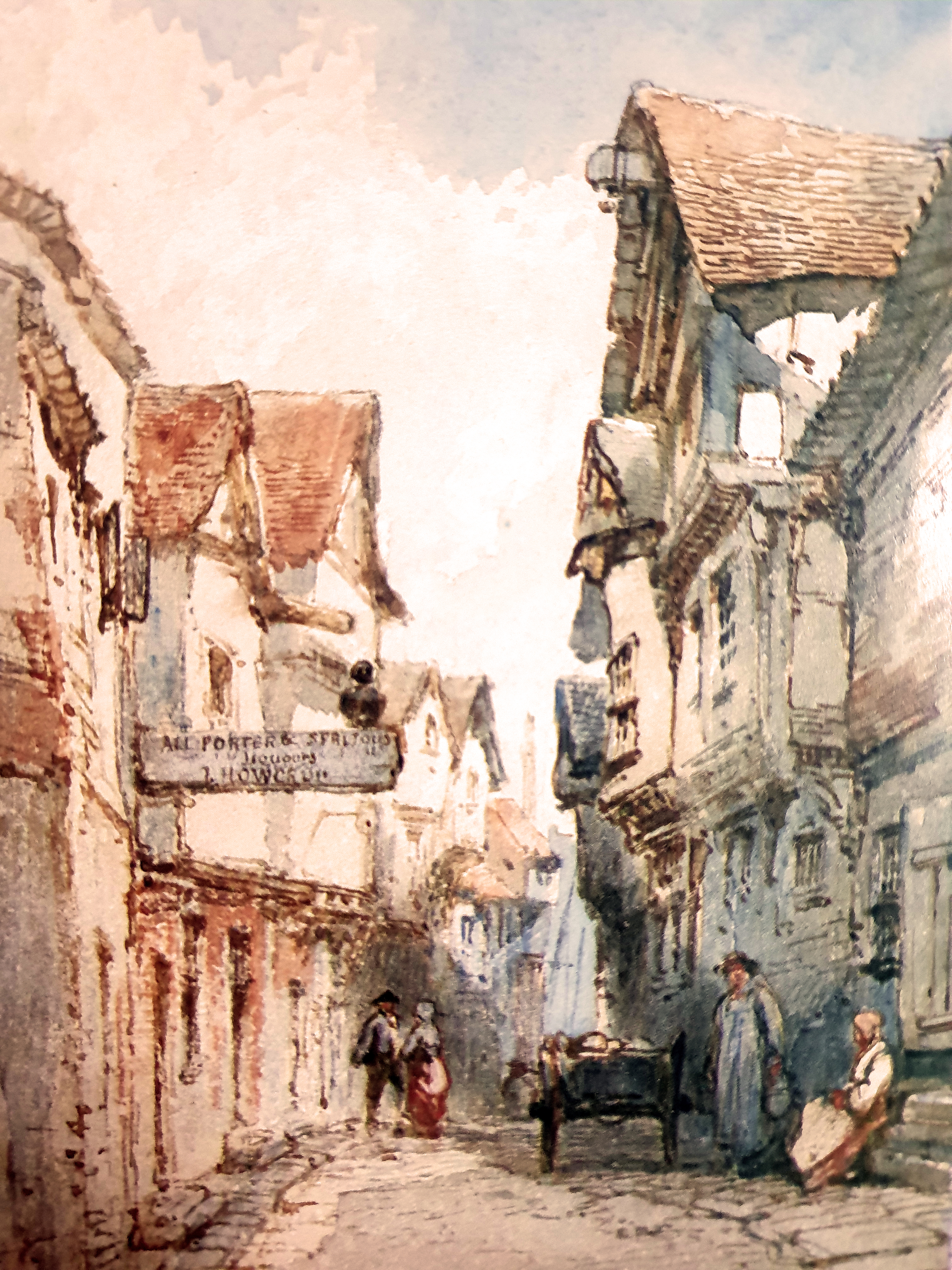
First Water Lane in York, with figures in street and cart. Two figures on right side in foreground.

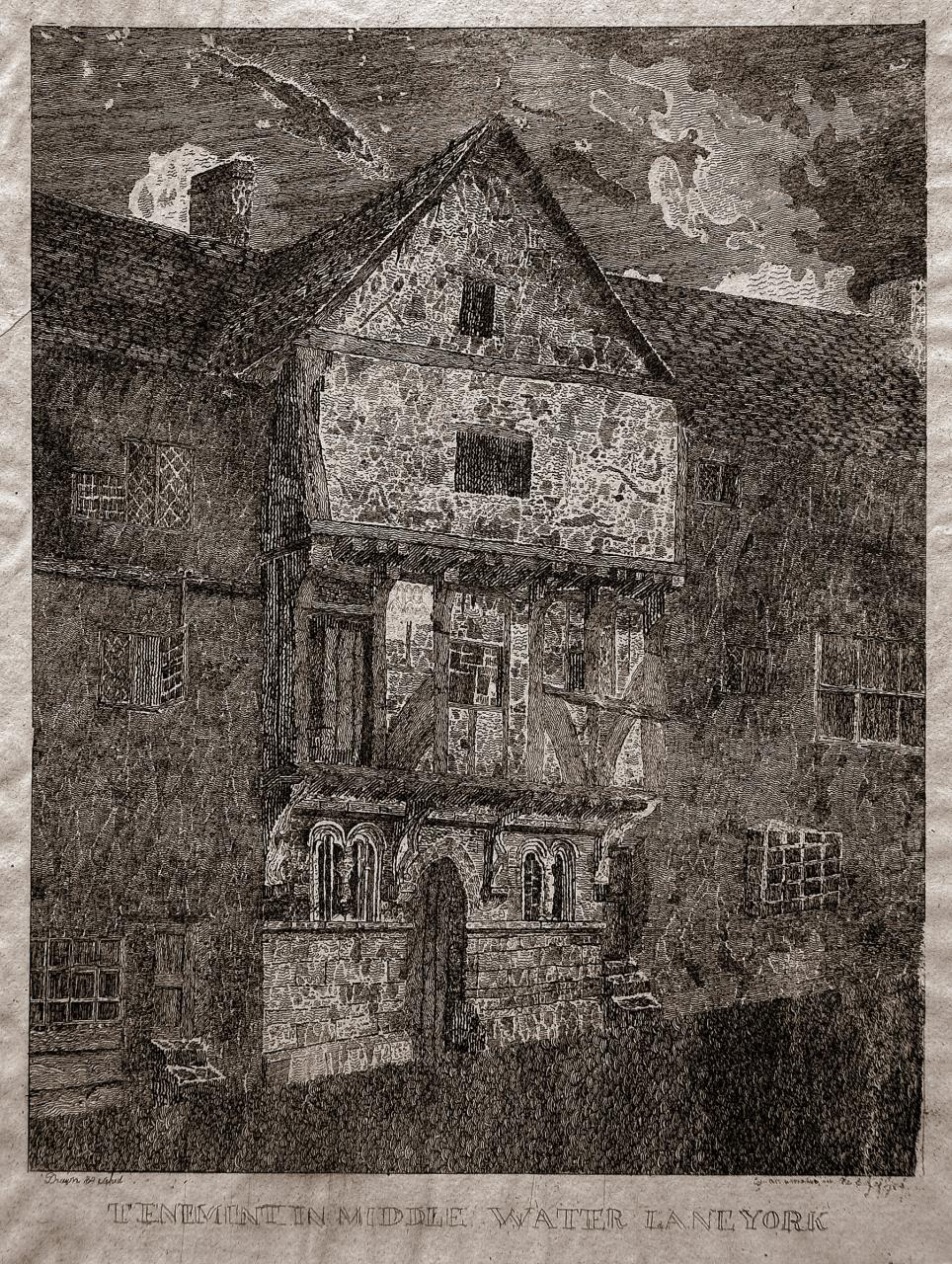
An etching of a three storey half-timbered house on Middle Water Lane, now Cumberland Street, York.
