= Cumberland House, York =

Grade I listed building in York, England

Cumberland House
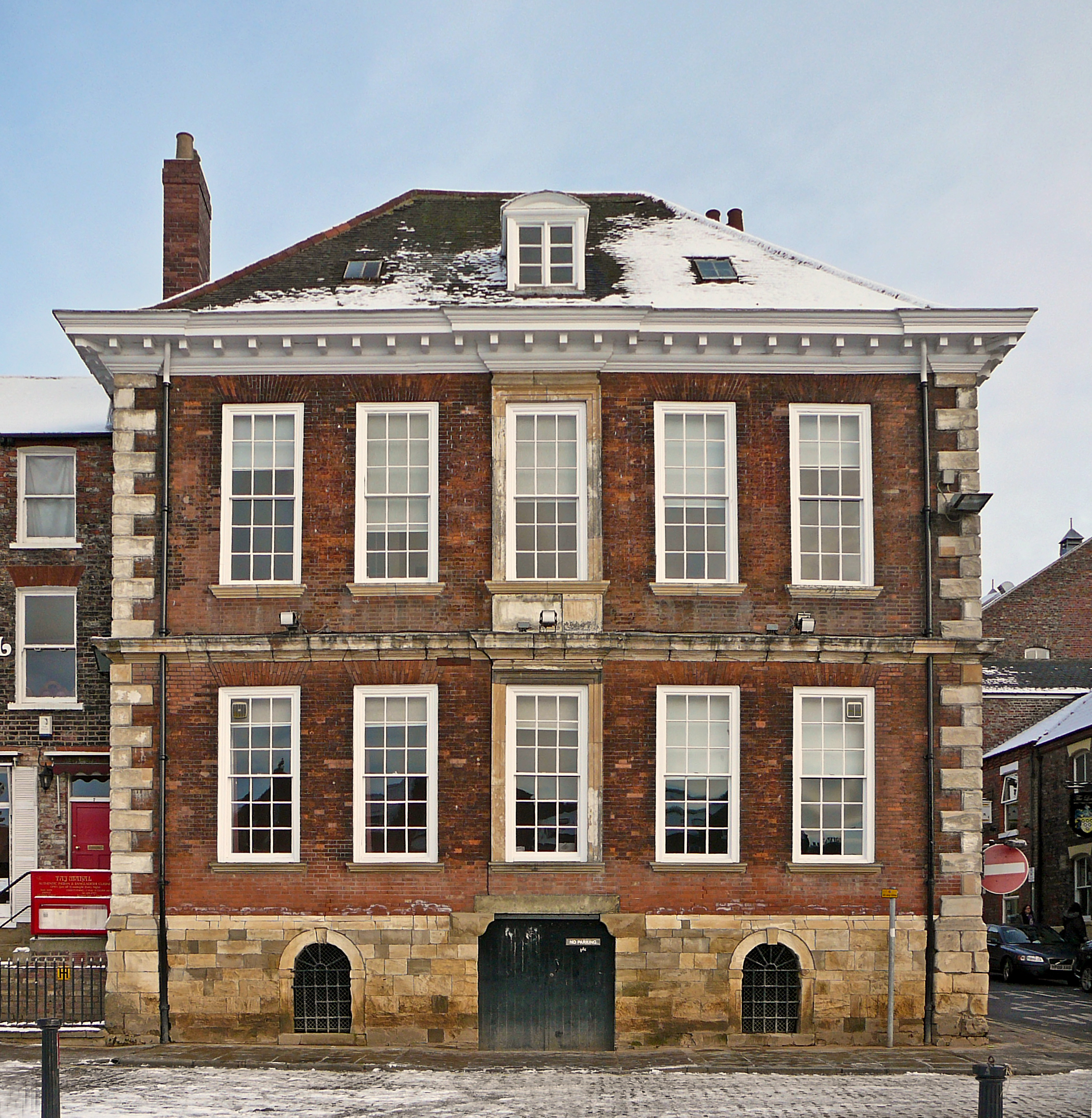
- Cumberland House, seen from King's Staith

- Location within York City Centre

General information
- Location: King's Staith, York, England
- Coordinates: 53°57′25″N 1°04′58″W
- Year built: c. 1710
- Renovated: 19th century (extended) c.1950 (restored)
- Client: William Cornwell

Design and construction
- Designations

Listed Building – Grade I
- Official name: Cumberland House
- Designated: 14 June 1954
- Reference no.: 1257526

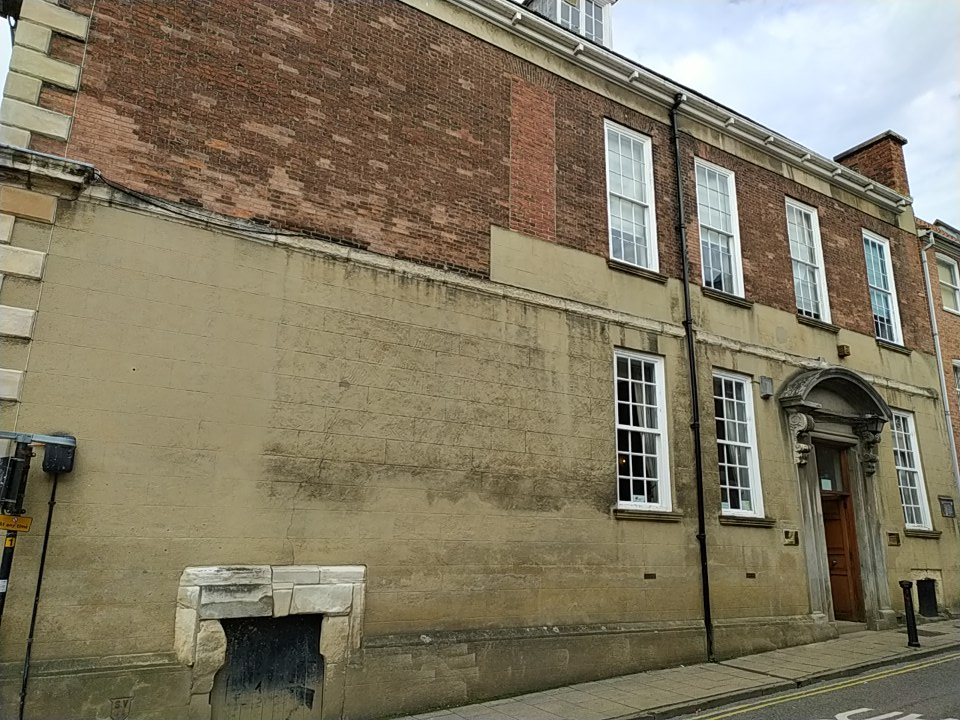
The main entrance, on Cumberland Street

Cumberland House is a Grade I listed building in the city centre of York, England.

The house lies on King's Staith, overlooking the River Ouse. While the basement is accessed from King's Staith, because the street frequently floods, the house's main entrance is on Cumberland Street. It was built in about 1710 by William Cornwell, an industrialist who subsequently became Lord Mayor of York. The house itself acquired its name in the 1740s, with the Prince William, Duke of Cumberland, supposedly having stayed there on 23 July 1746, following his victory at the Battle of Culloden.

The house formed the water front end of the entrance to a medieval street known as Middle Water Lane, until that street was demolished in a slum clearance program in the mid-19th century. The street was rebuilt and renamed as Cumberland Street in the late 19th century.

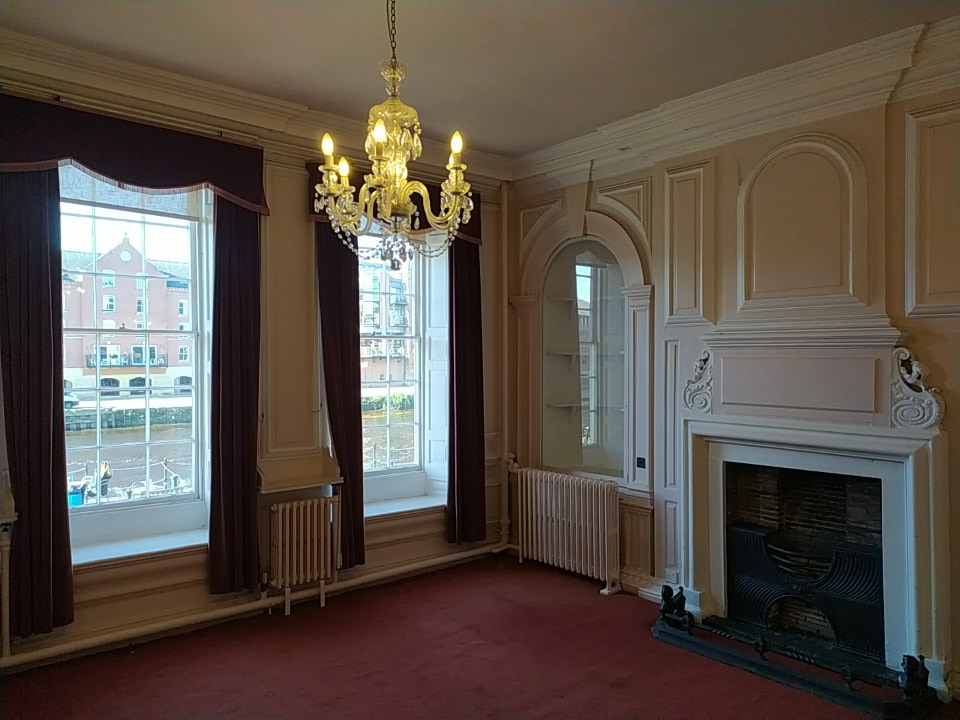
Main ground floor room

The house is built of brick, although the basement and some features are of magnesian limestone. It has two main storeys, with an attic and basement, and has five bays facing King's Staith. Inside, the two main reception rooms and staircase preserve their original features, and there are original fireplaces upstairs, but the service wing of the house, to the east, was remodelled in the 20th century. The house was restored from 1950 onwards.

== See also ==
- Grade I listed buildings in the City of York
- Listed buildings in York (within the city walls, southern part)
