= Cem Karakaş =

Turkish businessman

- Born: Ankara, Turkiye
- Education: Middle East Technical University; Massachusetts Institute of Technology; Istanbul University
- Occupation: Business executive
- Children: 2
- Website: www.afendis.com

Cem Karakaş is a Turkish businessman and a partner in Afendis Capital Management, a specialist investor in European food and pharmaceutical special situations. He is the executive chairperson of Cerealto and Glacier Ice Cream Group.

He was formerly the founding CEO of global biscuit, chocolate and confectionery company, pladis and Executive Deputy Chairman of pladis's parent company, Yildiz Holding.

Karakaş held several executive roles at Yildiz Holding, where he was credited with the acquisitions of DeMet's Candy Company and United Biscuits as well as leading the IPO of Bizim, and the overseeing the restructuring and secondary public offering of Ülker.

== Early life and education ==
Karakaş received a bachelor's degree from Middle East Technical University and a master's degree in Finance Engineering from the Massachusetts Institute of Technology (MIT), and a PhD in Finance from Istanbul University. He also attended American Institute of Baking.

== Career ==
In 2001, Karakaş joined the OYAK Group, a large Turkish institutional investor and fund management entity, where he served as a general manager and head of the groups mergers and acquisitions department. Following the acquisition of the Erdemir Group by OYAK, Karakaş was named CFO of Erdemir in 2006.

In 2010, Karakaş joined Yildiz Holding as CFO and a board member. He joined the board of Godiva in 2012, and was named CEO of Transformation and Non-food Business of Yildiz in 2013. Karakaş began serving as a board member of United Biscuits in 2014 and was named Executive Deputy Chairman of Yildiz Holding in 2015. As Executive Deputy Chairman of Yildiz Holding, Karakaş managed the integration of over 20 baked goods and confectionery businesses into the company, which led to the listing of Ulker on Borsa Istanbul, Turkey's stock exchange. He is also credited with leading the IPO of Bizim Toptam and the acquisition of DeMet's Candy and United Biscuits. Karakaş also led Turkey's largest bread business, Uno, and managed the acquisition and integration of Yildiz's retail arm.

In 2016, Karakaş became the founding CEO of Pladis, a new company created by Yildiz Holding to consolidate its core biscuit and confectionery businesses. The company combines Godiva, the international premium chocolate brand with a heritage of over 90 years, McVitie's, a global biscuit brand with a heritage of 180 years in the UK and Europe, Ulker, a biscuit and confectionery brand in Turkey and the Middle East with a heritage of over 70 years, and DeMet's Candy Company, known for its Flipz and Turtle brands, especially in the U.S. The company has operations in 180 countries across Europe, the Middle East, Africa, Asia and the Americas with 34 factories in 13 countries employing over 20,000 people. In September 2018, Karakaş stepped down from his role at pladis for sabbatical

In 2019, he founded Afendis Capital Management, a specialist investor in European food and pharmaceutical special situations.

He is a board member in Sanovel Pharmaceuticals and hepsiburada, a NASDAQ-listed digital marketplace.

He is also the chairperson of various bakery businesses in organic and gluten free space, namely Rudi's Organic in CO, USA and Promise Gluten Free in Ireland as well as Fresca Foods in CO, USA.

Throughout his career, Karakaş has led around 150 mergers, acquisitions and corporate restructurings.
