= Ülker (disambiguation) =

Ülker is a Turkish multinational food and beverage manufacturer.

Ülker may also refer to:

== People ==
- Hasan Ülker (born 1995), Turkish-German footballer
- Hüdai Ülker (born 1951), Turkish-German writer
- Murat Ülker (born 1959), Turkish businessman
- Sabri Ülker (1920–2012), Turkish businessman
- Ülker Pamir (born 1913–unknown), Turkish alpine skier
- Ülker Radziwill (born 1966), German politician

== Sports ==
- Ülker G.S.K., or Ülkerspor, Turkish basketball club
- Ülker Sports and Event Hall, in Ataşehir, Istanbul, Turkey
  - Fenerbahçe S.K. (basketball), formerly Fenerbahçe Ülker (2006–2015)
- Şükrü Saracoğlu Stadium, or Ülker Arena
  - Fenerbahçe S.K. (football)

== See also ==
- Ulke (disambiguation)
