= Pladis =

Snack and confectionery company

Pladis Foods Limited
- Trade name: Pladis Global; Pladis
- Type: Subsidiary
- Industry: Confectionery; Snack foods
- Founded: January 2016; 10 years ago
- Headquarters: London, England, UK
- Key people: Murat Ülker (Chairman); Tim Brett (President, International); Sridhar Ramamurthy (Chief financial officer; Chief executive officer, Godiva)
- Products: biscuit, chocolate, wafer, cake, gum, candy
- Brands: McVitie's; Ülker; Godiva; BN; Carr's; Flipz; Go Ahead; Haansbro; Jacob's; Sultana; Turtles; Verkade
- Revenue: ▲£3.272 billion (2025); £3.232 billion (2024)
- Number of employees: 15,000+ (2025; including Godiva)
- Parent: Yıldız Holding
- Subsidiaries: Godiva Chocolatier; Ülker Bisküvi Sanayi A.Ş. (47.2% stake; listed on Borsa Istanbul)
- Website: pladisglobal.com

Pladis Foods Limited, trading as Pladis Global or simply Pladis (styled as pladis), is a British confectionery and snack foods company with its headquarters in London, England. The company operates 26 bakeries and factories and its products reach approximately four billion people worldwide in 110 countries across Europe, the Middle East, Africa, Asia and the Americas.

Pladis was formed in January 2016 when Yıldız Holding brought together its biscuit and confectionery businesses, including United Biscuits, Ülker, DeMet's Candy Company and Godiva, under a new global snacking subsidiary. United Biscuits' UK operating business became Pladis (UK) Limited, while DeMet's Candy Company became Pladis North America, Inc.

The Pladis name was inspired by the Pleiades constellation, a group of seven stars visible from anywhere on Earth.

== History ==
Among its oldest constituent companies, McVitie's was established in Edinburgh in 1839. Jacob's was founded in Waterford in 1851 by Quaker brothers William and Robert Jacob. Verkade was founded in Zaandam, Netherlands in 1886 by Ericus Verkade. DeMet's Candy Company was founded in Chicago in 1898 by George DeMet. Godiva was founded in Brussels in 1926 by the Draps family, and Ülker in Istanbul in 1944 by brothers Sabri and Asim Ülker.

Yıldız Holding assembled its snacking portfolio through a series of acquisitions. In 2008, it acquired Godiva Chocolatier from Campbell Soup Company for $850 million. In 2014, Yıldız acquired DeMet's Candy Company for $221 million and United Biscuits, the parent company of McVitie's. In 2016, Yıldız unified these businesses to form Pladis as a single global snacking subsidiary. In 2023, Pladis began formally integrating Godiva into its brand portfolio; the process was completed in April 2024.

== Brands ==
Pladis' portfolio spans biscuits, chocolate and confectionery. Its brands include McVitie's (Digestives, Jaffa Cakes, Hobnobs, Rich Tea, Penguin), Ülker, Godiva, Jacob's (Cream Crackers, Twiglets, Mini Cheddars; UK market only), Carr's, BN, Go Ahead, Flipz, Turtles, Verkade, Haansbro and Sultana.

- Ülker: a Turkish food and beverage brand with a presence in 80 countries. Ülker manufacturers of food products including biscuits and confectionery.
- United Biscuits includes McVitie's, a leading snack food brand in the UK and Europe as well as a top five UK Food Brand. In February 2016, United Biscuits released McVitie's Digestive Nibbles, reducing traditional biscuits to a bite-sized format. In January 2017, McVities launched a line of thinner chocolate digestives, meant to be a healthier alternative than traditional biscuits. In May 2017, Pladis announced it would be launching McVitie's biscuits in the US in 2018. Jaffa Cakes is a part of McVitie's, and was reformulated in 2017. McVities also produce Hobnobs, Rich Tea, Penguins, Jacob's cream crackers, Carr's water biscuits, Crawford's, Meredith and Drew and Go Ahead.
- DeMet's Candy Company, which includes Flipz and Turtles.
- Godiva: manufacturer of premium chocolates and related products, founded in Belgium in 1926 pladis sells Godiva in grocery channels. At the May 2017 Sweet & Snacks Expo in Chicago, Pladis launched Godiva Masterpieces, which included the top three best selling case pieces from Godiva boutiques in individually wrapped candies. The line was initially sold through Costco. At the same time, Pladis announced it was releasing a uniform formulation for Godiva chocolate which was based on the original Belgian recipe developed in 1926. In September 2017, Pladis launched the Godiva Masterpieces line in the UK, and announced a partnership in which Masterpieces would be carried in Sainsbury stores. Pladis partnered with supermarkets in the UK, North America, China, Turkey, Sweden and Saudi Arabia and other countries to sell the Masterpieces line.
