= Flipz =

Brand of pretzel snack

Flipz is a type of confectionery created by Nestlé in 1997, consisting of salted pretzels covered in chocolate and other coatings.

The brand was acquired by DeMet's Candy Company in 2003. DeMet's was sold to Yıldız Holding in 2013 and, in January 2016, was brought together with United Biscuits, Ülker and Godiva under Pladis, Yildiz Holding's global snacking subsidiary. DeMet's Candy Company was subsequently renamed pladis North America, Inc.

Flipz are also produced for the United Kingdom and Ireland market by Pladis.

TV commercials for Flipz began in 1997 with the tagline "What's Your Excuse?"

== Flavors ==
- Milk Chocolate
- Dark Chocolate
- White Fudge
- Birthday Cake
- Caramel Sea Salt
- Strawberry Cheesecake
- Peanut Butter
- Cookies and Cream
- Gingerbread
- Bites/Clusterz Caramel and Salted Pretzel (USA)
- STUFF'D Milk Chocolate Peanut Butter Filled (USA)
- STUFF'D White Fudge Peanut Butter Filled (USA)
- STUFF'D Double Peanut Butter Filled (USA)
- Strawberry Shortcake (USA)
- Churros (USA)

=== Limited flavors ===
- Chocolate Mint
- S’mores
- Candy Cane
- Strawberry
- Unicornz "Purple Fudge Covered Pretzels Drizzled with Magic"
- Double Dipped Peanut Butter and Chocolate
- Pumpkin Spice Covered Pretzels
- Cinnamon Bun
- Blueberry Donut
- Snickerdoodle
- Peppermint Hot Chocolate
- Fried Chocolate Sandwich Cookie
- Sugar Cookie
