= Turtles (chocolate) =

Brand of candy by DeMet's Candy Company

DeMet's Turtles

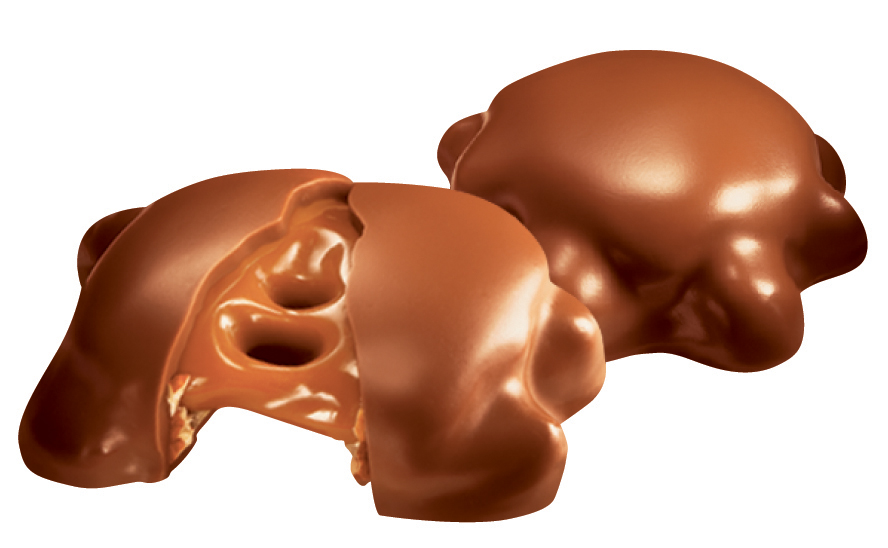
- Product type: Candy
- Current owner: Yıldız Holding (US), and Nestlé in Canada
- Produced by: DeMet's Candy Company (US), Nestlé (Canada)
- Country: United States
- Introduced: 1918 and 1949 to Canada
- Markets: North America
- Previous owners: Johnson's Candy Company; Nestlé; Brynwood Partners
- Website: demetsturtles.com

Turtles are a candy made with pecans and caramel dipped in chocolate, with a shape resembling a turtle. In the United States, the brand is associated with the former DeMet's Candy Company portfolio, which was sold to Yildiz Holding in 2013 and brought under Pladis in January 2016. DeMet's Candy Company was subsequently renamed pladis North America, Inc. In Canada, they are sold under the Nestlé brand name.

== History ==
Turtles were developed in 1918 by Johnson’s Candy Company (which became DeMet’s Candy Company in 1923), after a salesman named Earnest Woollard came into the commissary’s dipping room and showed a candy to one of the dippers, who pointed out that the candy looked like a turtle. Soon after, Johnson’s Candy Company was making the same kind of candy and selling it under the name "Turtles".

Today, Turtles candies come in all sizes, shapes and recipes, some even shaped like a turtle, with modern mold-making techniques, but the originals were produced by candy dippers on a rectangular marble 'board', similar in size to a contemporary kitchen cutting board. The original recipe, as executed on marble, was pecans, caramel and various chocolates; they were a multi-task confection, requiring several sittings.

== Trademark ==
Pecans dipped in chocolate were commonly made in the early 1900s, however, Johnson's Candy Company first protected the trademark "Turtles". In 1923, the stores dropped the Johnson name and assumed the name DeMet's, passing along the trademark.

Nestle owned the brand in the USA for a time, but sold it to Brynwood Partners' DeMet's Candy Company in 2007. In 2013, Brynwood sold the company to Yıldız Holding.

=== Canadian Market ===
In Canada, the products are still distributed and sold as a Nestlé product; promoted as "a cherished Canadian tradition since 1949". They are a popular Christmas product sold by most major retailers especially during the holiday season. The Canadian packaging features Mr. Turtle, a mascot of an anthropomorphic turtle wearing a tuxedo, a top hat, and a monocle.
