= Happy Faces =

British biscuit brand

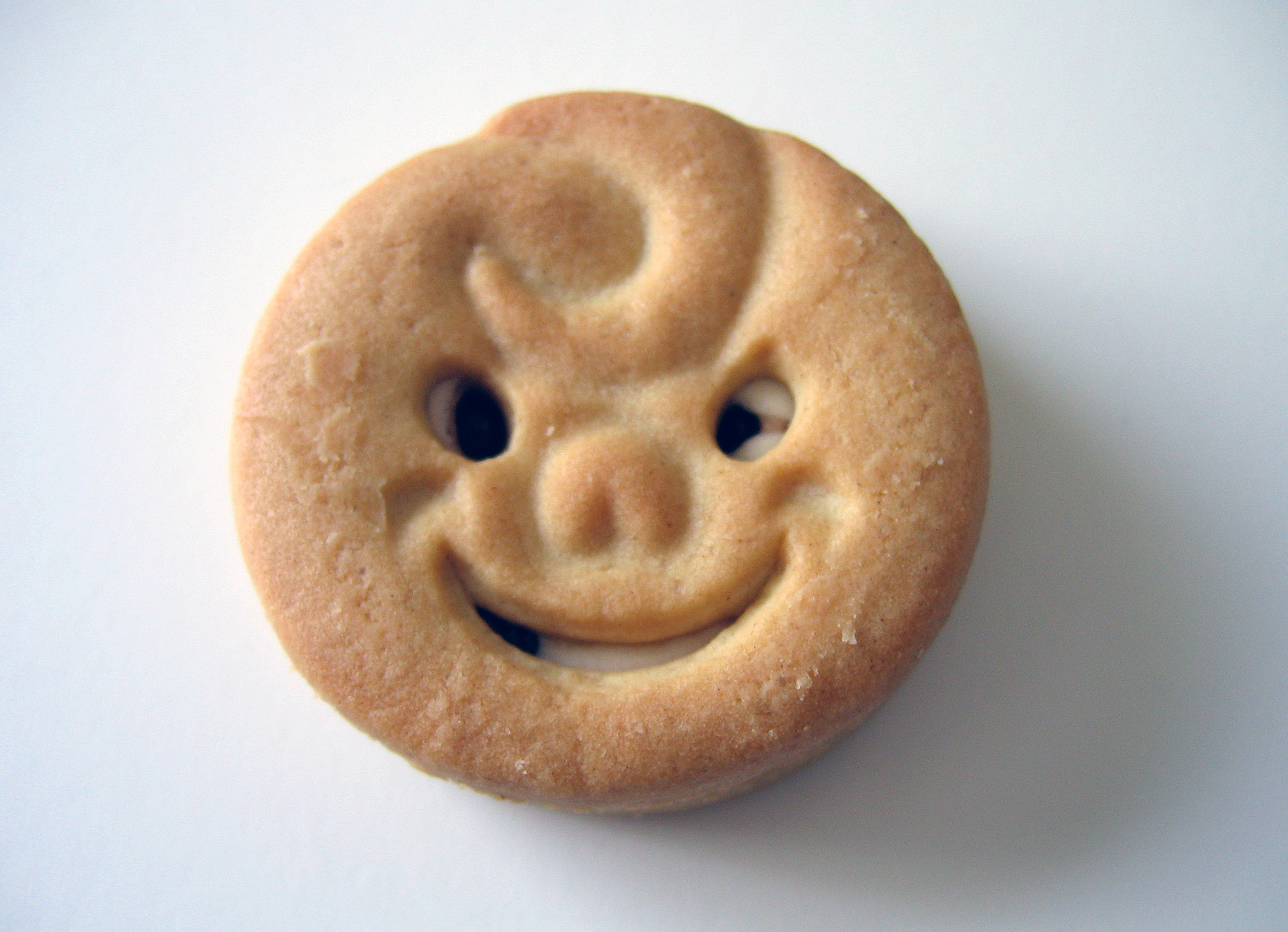
- A Happy Faces biscuit
- Type: Biscuit
- Place of origin: United Kingdom
- Created by: Jacob's Bakery Ltd.
- Main ingredients: Shortcake, raspberry jam, cream

Happy Faces are a brand of biscuit made by United Biscuits' subsidiary Jacob's Bakery Ltd. Similar to Jammie Dodgers, they are composed of two pieces of shortcake filled in the middle with raspberry jam and (unlike Jammie Dodgers) cream. The shortcake pieces are imprinted with faces (five types) that have holes where the eyes and mouth would go which allows one to see the filling. The biscuits are 45mm in diameter and sold in packs of 10. Project and Design Engineer Peter Stitson was involved in the original design process for the biscuit making machinery in the late 1960s or 70s when the company was known as Nabisco Frears. Happy Face was discontinued as a separate product in the mid 2010s and since were only found in Family Circle biscuit packs until 2020. It wasn't until May 2023 that McVities confirmed that production of Happy Faces has been resumed and the biscuit has started reappearing on supermarket shelves under the BN Brand.

In the United States, Nabisco produced a since-discontinued version called Giggles.
