= Trio (chocolate bar) =

Chocolate bar popular in the UK

- Product type: Biscuit
- Current owner: United Biscuits
- Country: United Kingdom
- Introduced: 1980s
- Tagline: I want a Trio and I want one now!

Trio is a chocolate bar sold in the United Kingdom consisting of a biscuit base topped with soft toffee cream and covered in thick milk chocolate. The Trio brand is owned by United Biscuits and sold under the McVitie's brand. Originally manufactured by Jacob's, Trio was discontinued in 2003, along with its Choc Trio variant, which featured soft chocolate cream instead of toffee cream and was introduced in 1988. There was also a strawberry variant, with soft strawberry cream in place of the standard toffee cream. The original toffee-flavoured bar returned in March 2016 following a campaign on Facebook.

The brand was known in the 1980s for its distinctive television advertisements by animator Bob Godfrey in which a cartoon character called Suzy sang along to the tune of Day-O (The Banana Boat Song): "Trio, Trio, I want a Trio and I want one now".
