= Tunis cake =

British Christmas dessert

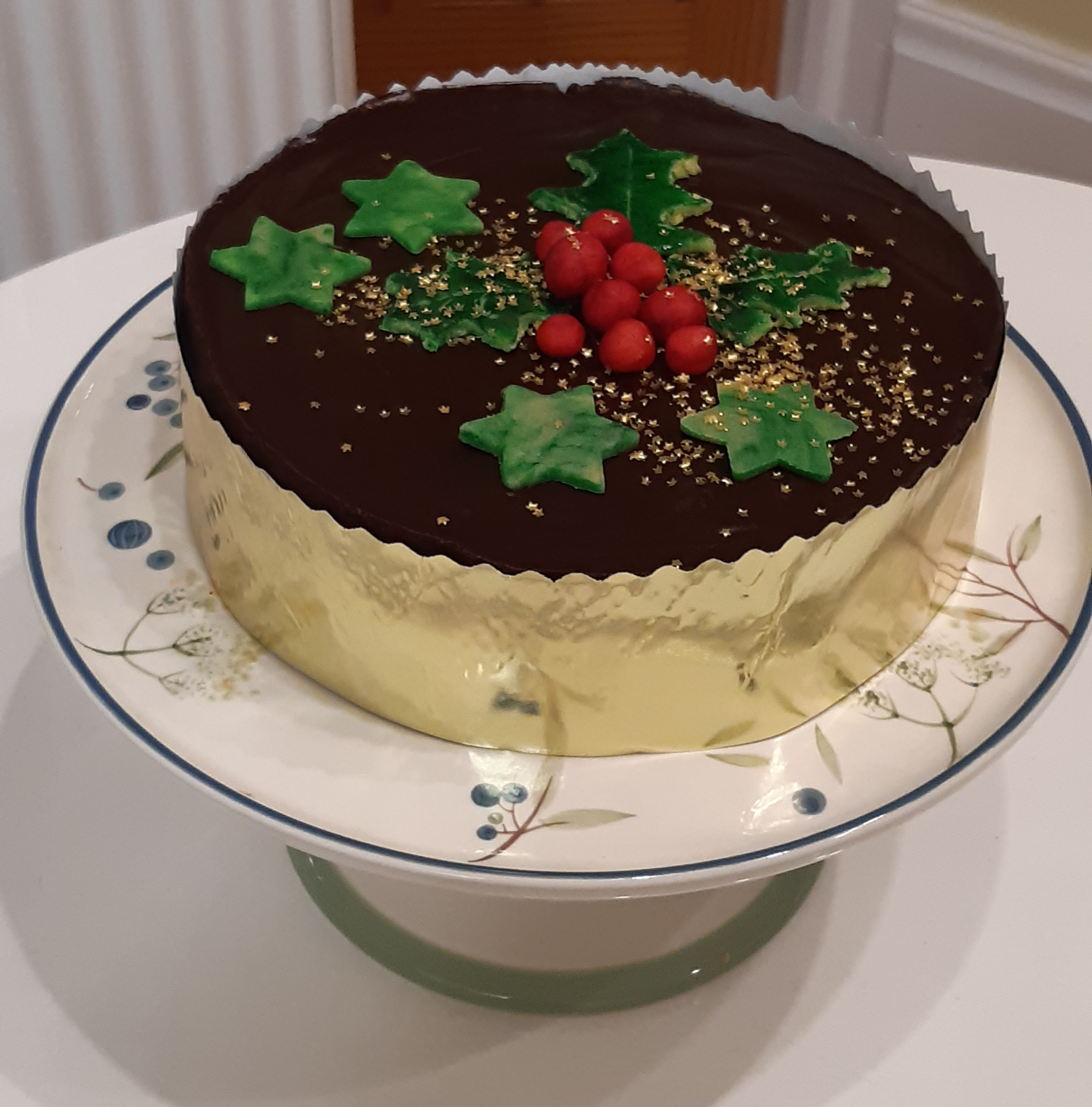
- Tunis Cake (Mary Berry recipe)
- Type: Madeira cake
- Place of origin: Scotland
- Region or state: Inverness-shire
- Main ingredients: Chocolate icing, marzipan

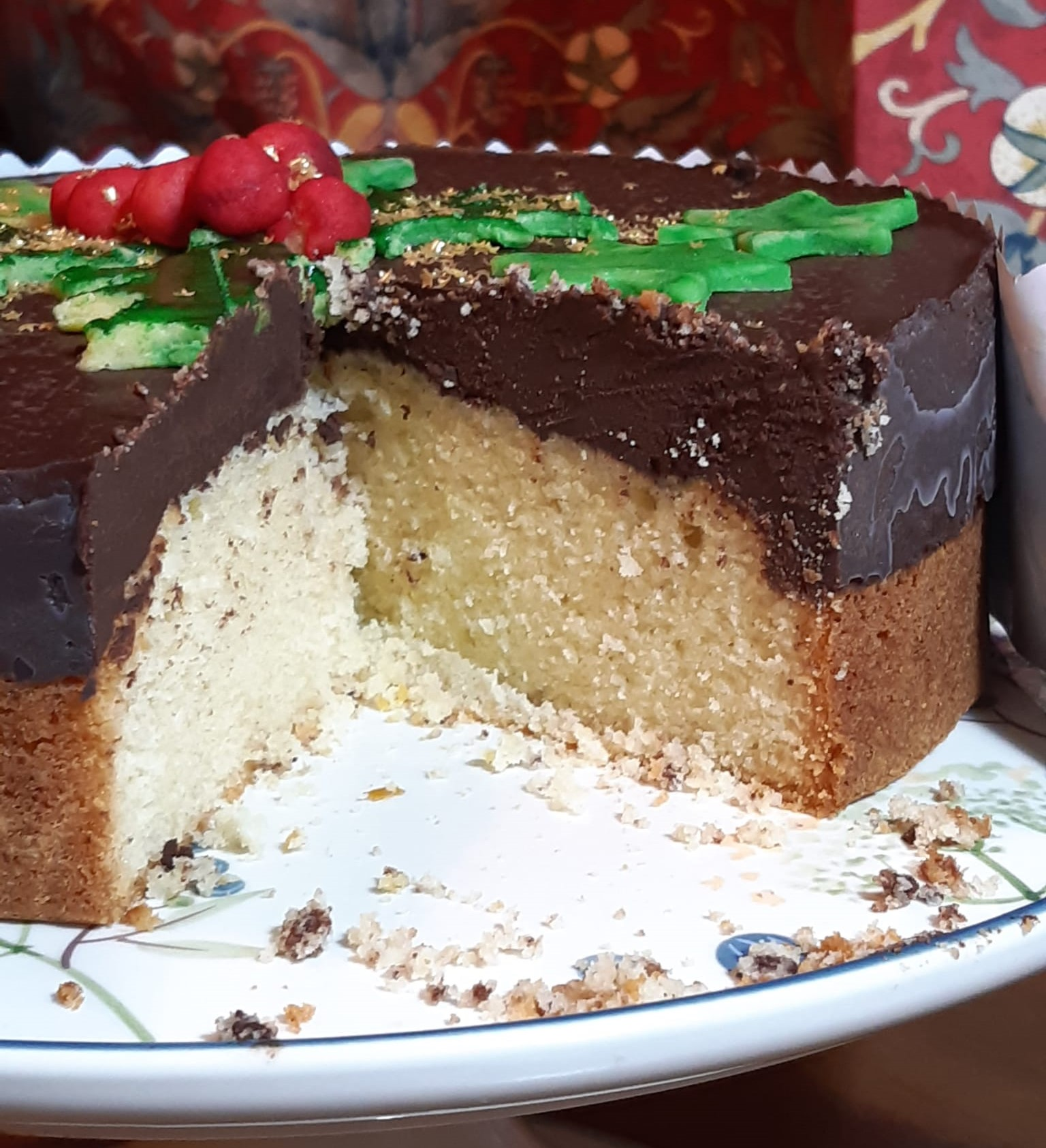
Cross-section of a Tunis Cake (Mary Berry recipe)

A Tunis cake is a Madeira cake topped with a thick layer of chocolate and decorated with marzipan fruits. It is traditionally eaten at Christmas.

It is thought that the origins of the cake are Edwardian. The Scottish bakery Macfarlane Langs produced commercial Tunis Cakes in the 1930s, and when they merged with McVitie & Price in 1948 to form a company called United Biscuits (which still owns the McVitie's brand), the recipe passed to the new company. McVitie's produced a Tunis cake until the mid 1980s. The updated recipe used by McVitie's is said to have been created by Elizabeth Ewing of Inverness, whose husband was a baker at McVitie's. Her husband had eaten a similar cake whilst stationed in Tunisia during World War II.

It is now sold seasonally by some supermarkets in the UK. The cake is usually topped with marzipan fruits. Some recipes, such as the BBC Good Food and Mary Berry recipe, top the cake with marzipan holly leaves and berries instead of marzipan fruits. An early recipe does not include the chocolate and marzipan topping.

The port city of Tunis was known for exporting North African fruits. In March 1934 the Taunton Courier and Western Advertiser printed a recipe including the North African fruits dates, figs, walnuts and prunes. In 1936 Garratt's Bakers of Lichfield included honey, dates and walnuts in their recipe, plus topping the cake with chocolate icing.
