= Carr's =

British biscuit and cracker maker

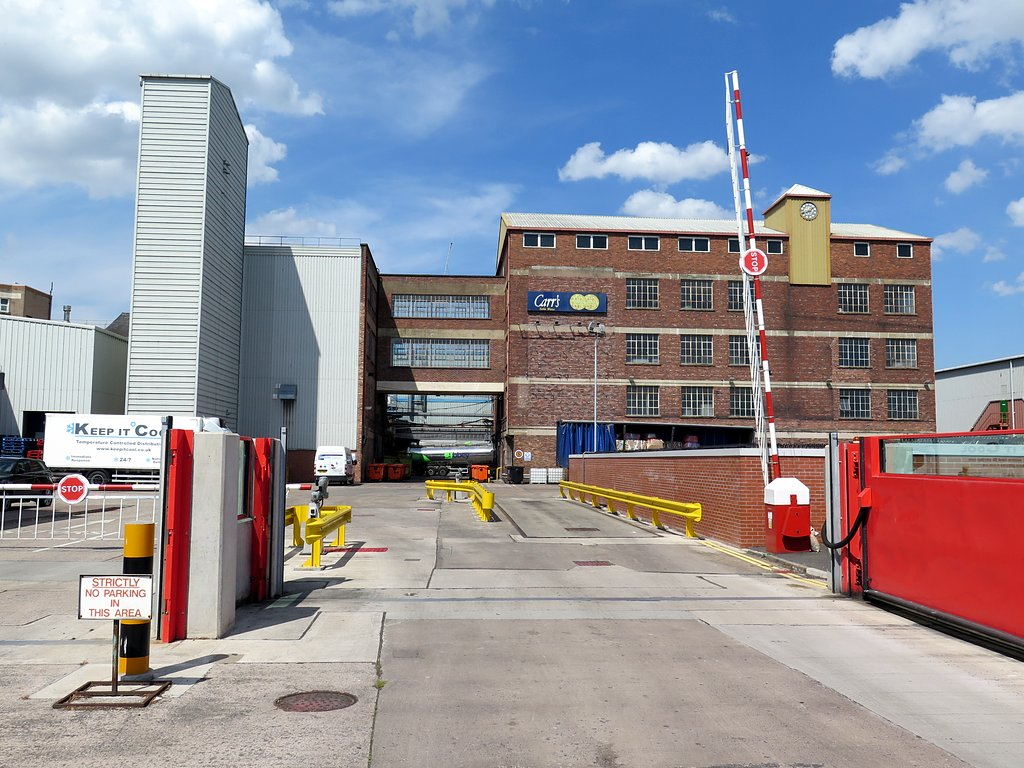
- McVities/Carr factory in Carlisle
- Type: Private (1831–1964); Subsidiary (1931–present)
- Founded: 1831; 195 years ago in Carlisle, Cumberland
- Founder: Jonathan Dodgson Carr
- Headquarters: Carlisle, United Kingdom
- Products: Biscuits (United Biscuits); Flour (Carr's Flour Mills Ltd)
- Parent: Cavenham Foods (1964–71); United Biscuits (1972–2016); Pladis (2016–present)
- Website: carrscrackers.com

Carr's is a British biscuit and cracker manufacturer, currently owned by Pladis, the global snacking company of Yıldız Holding. The company was founded in 1831 by Jonathan Dodgson Carr and is marketed in the United States by Kellanova.

== History ==
In 1831, Carr formed a small bakery and biscuit factory in the English city of Carlisle in Cumberland; he received a royal warrant in 1841. Within 15 years of being founded, it had become Britain's largest baking business.

Newspaper advertisement from The Guardian, 1922

Carr's business was both a mill and a bakery, an early example of vertical integration, and produced bread by night and biscuits by day. The biscuits were loosely based on dry biscuits used on long voyages by sailors. They could be kept crisp and fresh in tins, and despite their fragility could easily be transported to other parts of the country by canal and railway.

Jonathan Carr protested against the Corn Laws, which placed steep tariffs on imported wheat to keep the price of British wheat artificially high. This meant bread was expensive even in times of famine. Carr died in 1884, but by 1885, the company was making 128 varieties of biscuit and employing 1000 workers.

In 1894, the company was registered as Carr and Co. Ltd., but reverted to being a private company in 1908. Carrs Flour Mills Limited was incorporated after acquiring the flour-milling assets. Jonathan's four sons were less skilled at managing the business, but biscuit production remained in the family. It became part of Cavenham Foods in 1964 until 1972, when it was sold to United Biscuits group, along with Cavenham's other biscuit brands Wright's Biscuits and Kemps for $10 million. United Biscuits was sold by its private equity owners to the Turkish-based multinational Yıldız Holding in 2014; in 2016, all UB brands including Carr's were combined with Yıldız's other snack brands to form pladis.

Among members of the Carr family who worked for the business was former Commando Capt. Richard Carr MBE. He was decorated for repeated escape attempts from Italian and German prisoner-of-war camps in the Second World War.

== Business ==
The Carr's biscuit factory became part of United Biscuits in 1972, with the rest of the company continuing to operate as Carr's Group. United Biscuits was subsequently acquired by Yıldız Holding in 2014 and became part of pladis in 2016. The factory today is known officially as McVitie's, but still known locally as Carr's.

In March 2012, it was announced that Carr's Table Water Biscuits had lost its royal warrant due to 'changing tastes' in the Royal Households. Carr's promptly licensed the coat of arms of the City of Carlisle to replace the coat of royal arms on their packaging.

In 2016, the independent Carr's Group sold its flour-milling division to Whitworths Holdings Ltd, and also sold its engineering business, with the company announcing it was focusing on agricultural feed products. It rebranded as Fevara plc in 2025 and is based in Carlisle, buying up the Brazilian agribusiness company Domino Industria E Comercio in 2025.

== Flooding ==
In 2005, the Caldewgate factory in Carlisle lost two months' production due to flooding. Production resumed after a £1 million government grant.

The Caldewgate factory was flooded again on 6 December 2015, with levels exceeding five feet (over 150 cm). The floodwater damaged the brick ovens and resulted in product shortages on retail shelves. After closure of the works for a month to repair and clear flood damage, production and distribution gradually resumed in spring 2016.

== See also ==
- List of crackers
- List of royal warrant holders of the British royal family
