= Ulke =

Ulke may refer to:

- Henry Ulke (1821–1910), American photographer and portrait painter
- Ulcani (Hungarian: Ülke), a village in Dealu Commune, Harghita County, Romania

== See also ==
- Ülker (disambiguation)
