= BN (biscuit) =

Franco-British baked foodstuff brand

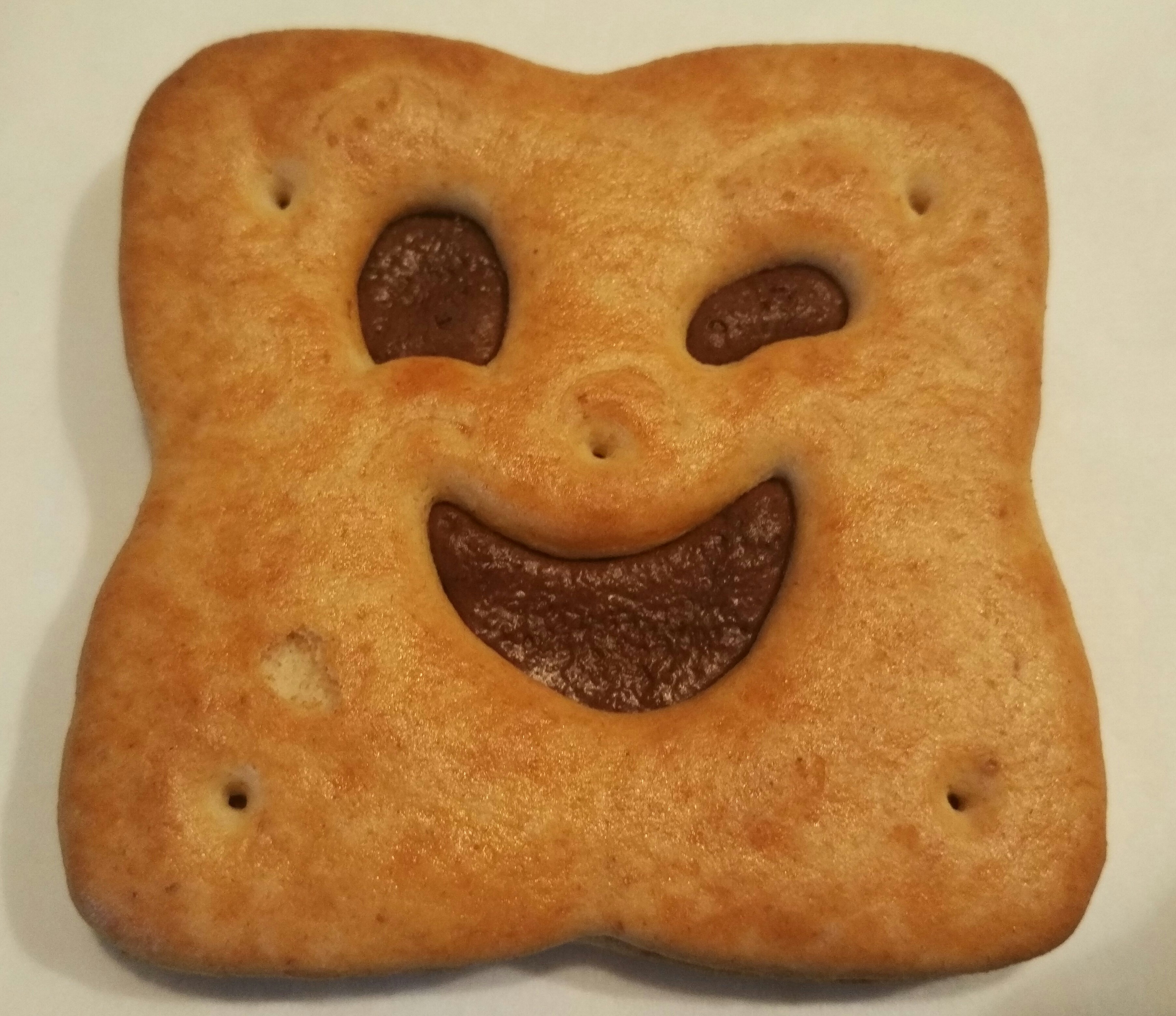
A smiling chocolate-flavoured BN.

BN Biscuits (or Biscuiterie Nantaise) is a French biscuit brand, founded in 1896. The BN range consists of sandwich biscuits with fillings. One side of the biscuit is decorated with a smiling face. The Choco BN was the first sandwich-cookie with a chocolate filling and launched in 1933.

Biscuiterie Nantaise company was acquired by General Mills in 1973, which later sold its European assets to PepsiCo in 1992. PepsiCo later sold BN to United Biscuits in 1997. In November 2014, United Biscuits was acquired by Yıldız Holding, bringing BN into Yildiz's portfolio. In January 2016, United Biscuits became part of Pladis, the global snacking subsidiary formed by Yildiz Holding.

The BN range now consists of multiple different biscuit formats, but the classic sandwich biscuit range consists of two different shapes: circles and rounded squares. One side of the biscuit is decorated with one of four different faces. There are seven different flavours of the BN biscuit: chocolate, strawberry, vanilla, hazelnut, raspberry, apricot and milk chocolate. They also come in a "Mini BN" variety.

BN Biscuits were re-launched in September 1999 in the United Kingdom, involving an advertising campaign with the name "BN BN" sung along to the tune of an arranged version "Mah Nà Mah Nà".

BN Biscuits were not sold in the UK for a 10-year gap (2003 to 2013); however, they were still sold in many French, South African, Nigerian and Afghan stores.

In 2013, BN returned to UK supermarkets with new packaging and logos, branded as "McVitie's BN". A new advert for the biscuit, part of McVitie's then-current "Sweeet" campaign, once again featured an arranged version of "Mah Nà Mah Nà" in reference to the previous campaign, albeit with the correct lyrics rather than "BN BN".

In January 2022 BN biscuits were re-launched in the UK under the McVitie's brand with the slogan 'Taste the Smile'. McVitie's returning range included BN Chocolate, BN Vanilla, Mini BN Chocolate and Mini BN Strawberry.
