= Murat Ülker =

Turkish businessperson

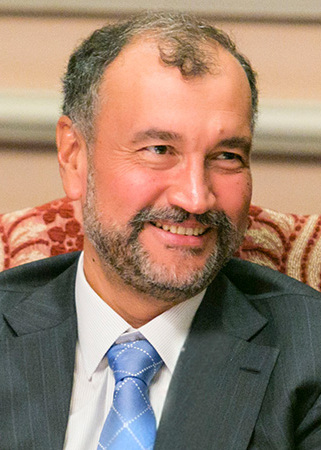
- Murat Ülker in 2014
- Born: 21 March 1959 (age 67); Istanbul, Turkey
- Education: Istanbul High School
- Alma mater: Boğaziçi University; American Institute of Baking; Die Süßwaren-Akademie
- Occupation: Businessperson
- Title: Chair, Yıldız Holding
- Spouse: Betul Atasevan
- Children: 3
- Parent(s): Sabri Ülker; Güzide İman

Murat Ülker (born 1959) is a Turkish billionaire businessperson and the former chair of Yıldız Holding. He is among the 900 richest people in the world as of July 2026.

== Early life ==
Murat Ülker was born to Sabri Ülker and Güzide İman on 21 March 1959 in Istanbul, Turkey. He attended high school at İstanbul Erkek Lisesi and graduated from Boğaziçi University with a degree in business administration. In 1982, he studied abroad at the American Institute of Baking (AIB) and Zentralfachschule der Deutschen Süßwarenwirtschaft (ZDS) and trained at Continental Baking Company in the United States. He also worked on various International Executive Service Corps projects.

== Career ==
In 1984, Ülker joined the Ülker Group, part of Yıldız Holding, as a control coordinator. Over the following years, he served as assistant general manager for enterprises, and later, as general manager.

In 2000, Ülker became the CEO of Yıldız Holding, before becoming its chairman in 2008. Under his chairmanship, Yıldız Holding expanded its business and made several acquisitions including GODIVA Chocolatier in 2008 and United Biscuits in 2014. In 2016, Yıldız formed a new global business, pladis, by bringing together three of its brands: Ülker, United Biscuits, and DeMet’s Candy Company.

== Philanthropy ==
In 2009, the Ülker family established the Sabri Ülker Foundation to make a lasting contribution to public health in the areas of food and nutrition.

In 2014, the Ülker family contributed $24 million to Harvard University. The funding, distributed over 10 years, was provided to establish The Sabri Ülker Center for Nutrient, Genetic, and Metabolic Research at the T.H. Chan School of Public Health. The center addresses chronic and complex diseases to help millions of people with illnesses such as diabetes and cardiovascular disease.

== Personal life ==
Murat Ülker is of Crimean Tat descent. He said that his father said "we are Tats, not Tatars", adding that "Tats are a mixed ethnic group that come from abroad and settled in Crimea. But when you look from the distance, you would say they look like Tatars."

He is married, with three children, and lives in Istanbul.

He is an art collector. In 2012, Ülker sponsored the retrospective art exhibition "Fifty Years of Urban Walls" at Istanbul Modern which attracted 215,000 visitors with 120 works by Burhan Doğançay.

Ülker aided in the foundation of the Ülkerspor basketball club in 1993, which later became Fenerbahçe Ülker. The club has won the league championship four times, the Presidential Cup six times, and the Turkish Cup three times. Ülkerspor also reached the quarterfinals of the FIBA European Champions Cup as well as the FIBA Korać Cup. Ülker purchased the naming rights of the Fenerbahçe Şükrü Saracoğlu Stadium for ten years. He has also sponsored the Ülker Sports Arena. Ülker previously supported other football clubs as well, but later withdrew his sponsorship.

In 2018, Ülker was named the richest businessman in Turkey with a net worth of $4.8 billion.
