= Taxi (chocolate) =

Chocolate biscuit brand

Taxi was the name of a chocolate biscuit sold under the McVitie's biscuit brand. It was produced by the European food manufacturer United Biscuits. The bar consisted of layers of wafer, caramel, and chocolate creme, and was covered in chocolate, and was suitable for a vegetarian diet. Taxi used to be available in multi-packs using a yellow and blue wrapper, in a New York taxi cab style design.
