= Penguin (biscuit) =

Chocolate flavoured sandwich biscuit brand

- Type: Biscuit
- Place of origin: Scotland
- Region or state: Glasgow
- Created by: William McDonald
- Invented: 1932
- Variations: Orange; Mint; Cake bars

Penguin is a chocolate sandwich biscuit with a chocolate flavoured coating, filled with chocolate flavour cream. It is produced by Pladis' manufacturing division McVitie's at their Stockport factory. Since 2025, the coating on the biscuits has been described as "chocolate flavour" because the amount of cocoa it contains has been reduced below the 20% minimum required to be called "chocolate".

== History ==
William Macdonald founded Macdonald Biscuits in Glasgow in 1928. After seeing some biscuits from Antwerp, Belgium he was inspired to create a chocolate covered biscuit with a chocolate cream sandwich in the centre. They were first produced in 1932 and became a McVitie's product a few years after MacDonald was taken over by United Biscuits in 1965. Each wrapper has a joke or "funny fact" printed on it and imaginative, often humorous designs featuring penguins that often pastiche famous works of art.

The Tim Tam, produced by Arnott's in Australia and first sold in 1964, was based on the Penguin. Occasional media references include tongue-in-cheek debates over which is the superior biscuit.

During the 1970s, the Penguin brand became known for their television advertising slogan "When you feel a little p-peckish, p-p-p-pick up a Penguin!”

In October 1996, Penguins were the subject of a court case between Asda and United Biscuits, who accused Asda of passing off their own brand "Puffin" biscuits as part of the Penguin brand. In March 1997, the court found in favour of United Biscuits regarding passing off, but found that Asda had not infringed the Penguin trademark.

United Biscuits had been criticised for continuing to use trans fatty acids in the cream filling of Penguins. By December 2007, United Biscuits began to advertise the absence of trans fats from Penguins, having removed the ingredient from this product line.

== Wrapper ==
The front of the wrapper typically has a penguin on it. The sides of the wrapper typically feature a joke and a penguin related fact.

According to content creator Chris Spargo, a Penguin wrapper can feature 9 unique jokes, 7 unique facts and 7 unique stylised front designs.

== Types ==
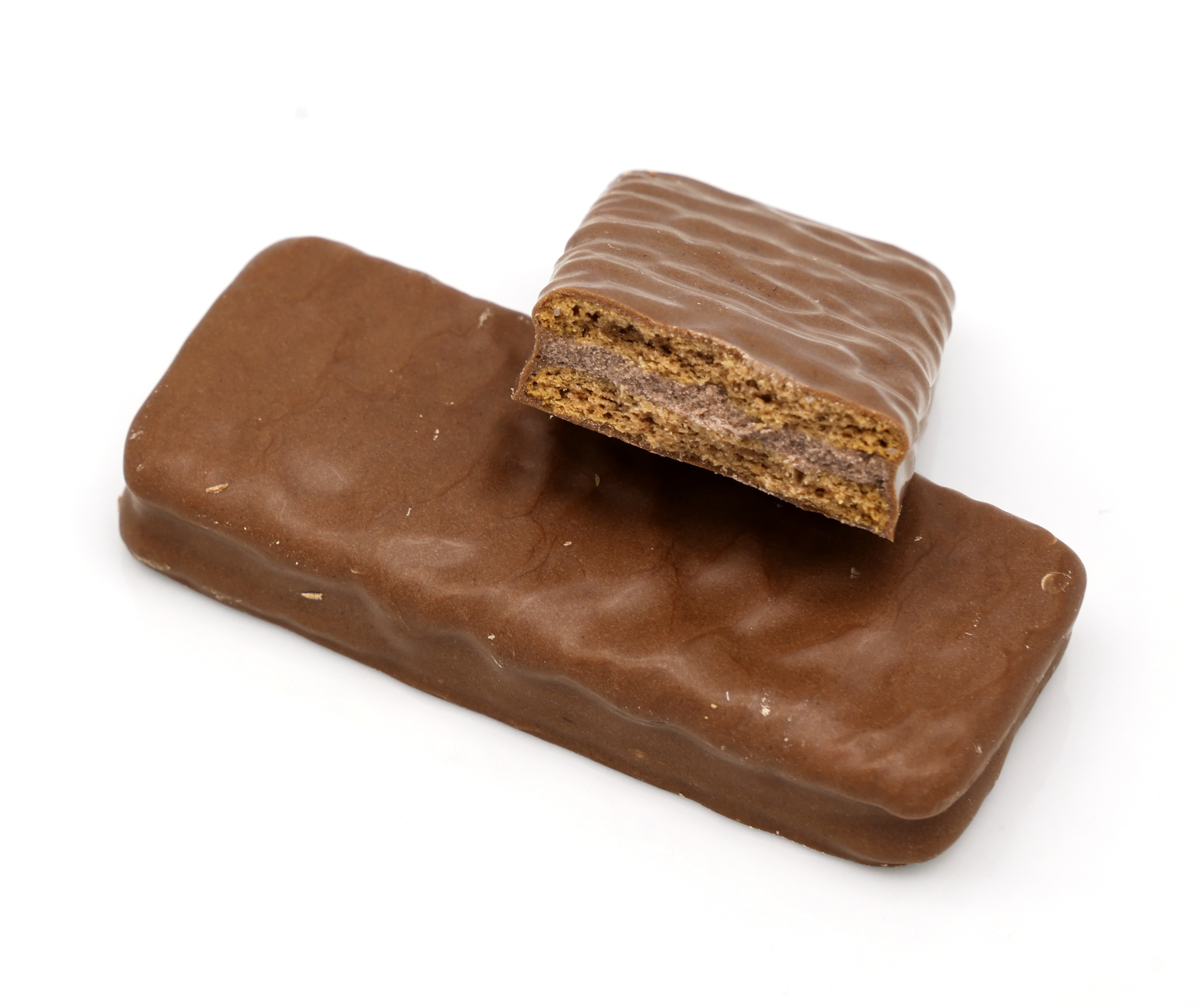
Penguin bars

There are four variations of the biscuit:

- Milk Chocolate
- Orange
- Mint
- Caramel

== Former flavours ==
- Toffee
- Dark chocolate

== Spin off brands ==
In June 2003, McVitie's produced several "sub brands" or variations of the Penguin biscuit: Penguin Chukkas, Wing Dings, Flipper Dipper, Splatz and Mini Splatz. These variations were accompanied by a £5 million promotional campaign. In January 2008, McVitie's also produced Penguin triple chocolate wafers.
