= McVitie's =

British snack food brand

- The McVitie's logo as updated in 2005
- Product type: Confectionery
- Current owner: Pladis
- Country: United Kingdom
- Introduced: 1839; 187 years ago Edinburgh, Scotland
- Markets: Worldwide
- Previous owners: McVities, Guest and Co; McVitie & Price Ltd
- Website: mcvities.com

McVitie's (/məkˈvɪtiz/) is a British snack food brand owned by pladis, a subsidiary of Yıldız Holding. The name is derived from the original Scottish biscuit maker, McVitie & Price, established in 1839 on Rose Street in Edinburgh, Scotland. The company moved to various sites in the city before completing the St. Andrews Biscuit Works factory on Robertson Avenue in the Gorgie district in 1888.

The company also established one in Glasgow and two large manufacturing plants south of the border, in Heaton Chapel, Stockport, and Park Royal, London. There are five McVitie's factories in the UK, with each producing a different types of biscuit; the Harlesden site in north-west London manufactures the chocolate digestives. McVitie's holds a Royal Warrant from King Charles III.

McVitie's are sold to more than 100 countries around the world. The best-selling biscuit manufacturer in the United Kingdom, McVitie's produces Jaffa Cakes and popular biscuits such as chocolate digestives, Hobnobs, and Rich tea. In 2020, sales of McVitie's biscuits in the UK were more than five times the next two competitors.

== History ==
=== Early history; McVities, Guest and Co ===
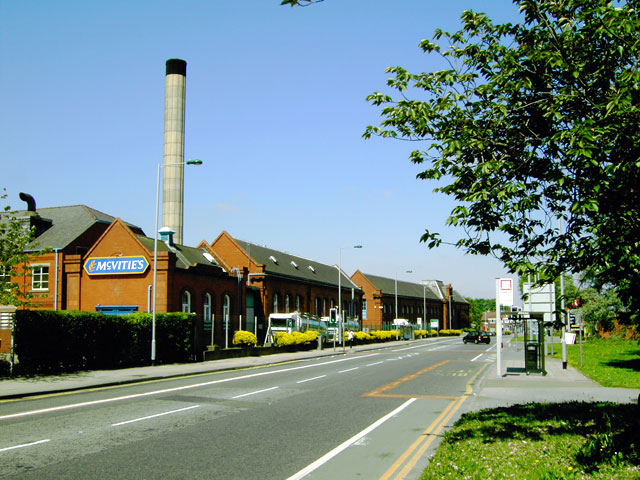
McVitie's factory in Heaton Chapel, Stockport produces over 2,000 Jaffa Cakes a minute.

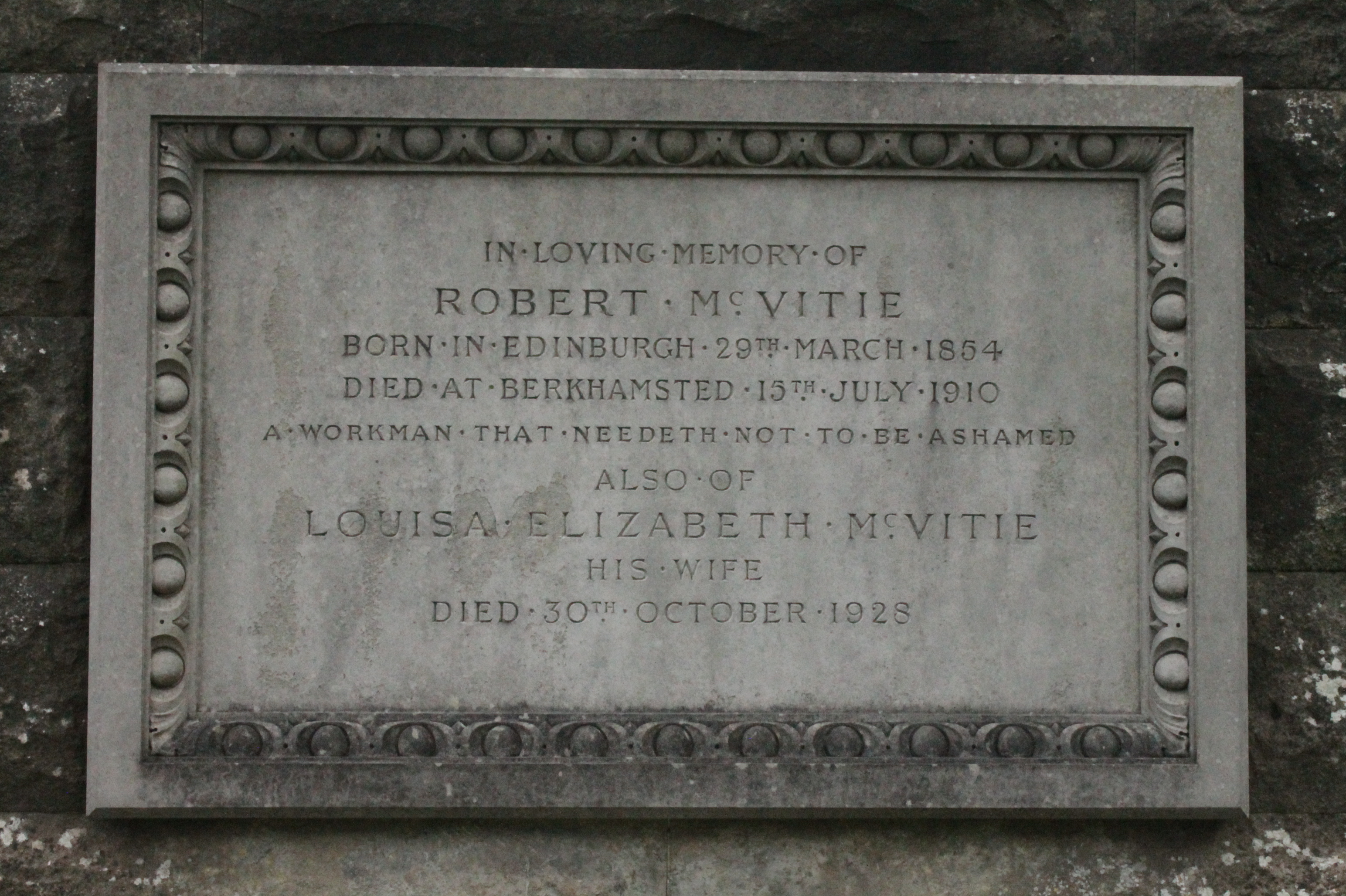
Memorial to Robert McVitie, Dean Cemetery, Edinburgh

Robert McVitie was born in Dumfries in 1809. He served an apprenticeship with a baker and in 1834 he moved to Edinburgh. He initially lived and worked at 130 Rose Street, just north of Princes Street in the New Town. In 1839, McVitie moved to the adjacent building at 129 Rose Street and started his company. It was called a "provision shop". In 1843, he opened a second shop at 14 Charlotte Place (later renamed Randolph Place) just west of Charlotte Square.

McVitie's is first described as a "baker and confectioner" rather than a provision shop in 1856 at 5 Charlotte Place. He used the basement area below the shop as the bakery. By 1865, the bakery had moved to 47 London Street just round the corner from his flat at 76 Broughton Street. In 1870, McVitie is described as a baker at 12 Antigua Street and 2 East London Street, both also near his home in Broughton Street. In 1875, the business was expanded to 23 and 24 Queensferry Street where McVitie is described as a baker and confectioner. In 1881, his eldest son, also Robert (1854–1910), was in charge of the Queensferry Street business while the other properties remained in his name until 1884 although he died in 1883. In the same year Robert junior also occupied 8 and 9 Merchant Street. In 1887, he employed Alexander Grant from Forres, an experienced biscuit maker, to aid him. He was employed as foreman of the bakery but left to set up his own bakery in Inverness, Scotland but he failed and returned to McVitie's.

In the late 19th century it was decided to split the operations of the business, with retail made a separate company. In 1898, McVitie rebranded the company as McVities, Guest and Co (usually McVities) after joining with his brother-in-law Edward Graham Guest. In 1903, they built the McVities Guest Tearoom at 135/136 Princes Street (on the corner of South Charlotte Street).

=== 1875–1947; McVitie & Price ===
In 1875, the company had been joined by Charles Edward Price as a salesman. His success in this role led to a partnership in 1888 to create McVitie & Price. In 1888, they built the huge St Andrews Biscuit Works on Robertson Avenue in the Gorgie district of south-west Edinburgh. Price left in 1910 following the death of Robert.

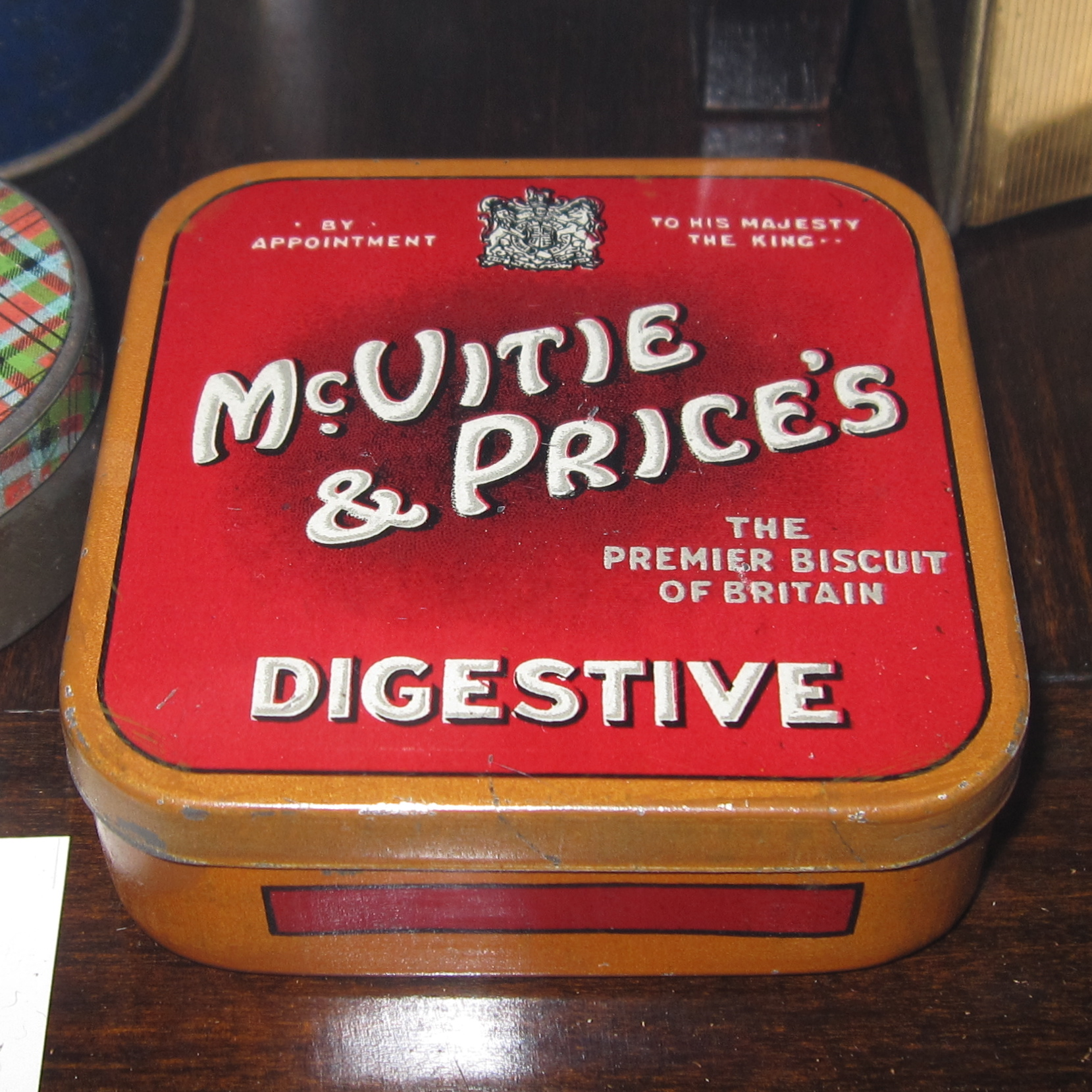
An early 20th century McVitie & Price's Digestive biscuit tin, located in the Victoria and Albert Museum, London. Plain digestives were launched in 1892.

In 1891, the London salesman for the company George Andrews Brown persuaded the company to redesign their Rich Tea biscuit to a smaller size to accommodate the London taste. The original Gorgie factory burned down in 1894, but was rebuilt the same year to a much improved technical standard. It remained operative until 1969 when production ceased and operations were transferred to the English sites which had been established at Harlesden, north-west London in 1902 which is the largest biscuit factory in the UK, and Manchester in 1914.

Robert McVitie died married but childless in 1910 in Berkhamsted rather than at his home 12 Greenhill Gardens in south Edinburgh. He is commemorated in Dean Cemetery in Edinburgh. After his death, McVitie & Price Limited was incorporated as a joint–stock limited company in 1911 placing Alexander Grant as managing director and principal share-holder. The firm acquired the Edinburgh bakery of Simon Henderson & Sons in 1922.

=== 1948–2001; United Biscuits Group ===
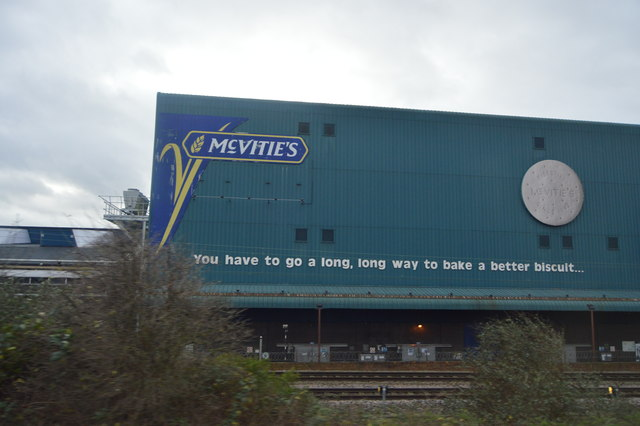
McVitie's factory in Harlesden, north-west London

McVitie & Price merged with another Scottish bakery company, Macfarlane, Lang & Co., Ltd, in 1948 to become United Biscuits Group. McVitie's brand products are manufactured in five United Kingdom factories: the two former McVitie & Price factories in Harlesden, England and Stockport, England; a former Macfarlane, Lang & Co. factory named Victoria Biscuit Works in Glasgow; a former Carr's factory named The Biscuit Works established 1831 in Carlisle, England; and the McVitie's Cake Co. factory (formerly Riley's Toffee Works) in Halifax, England.

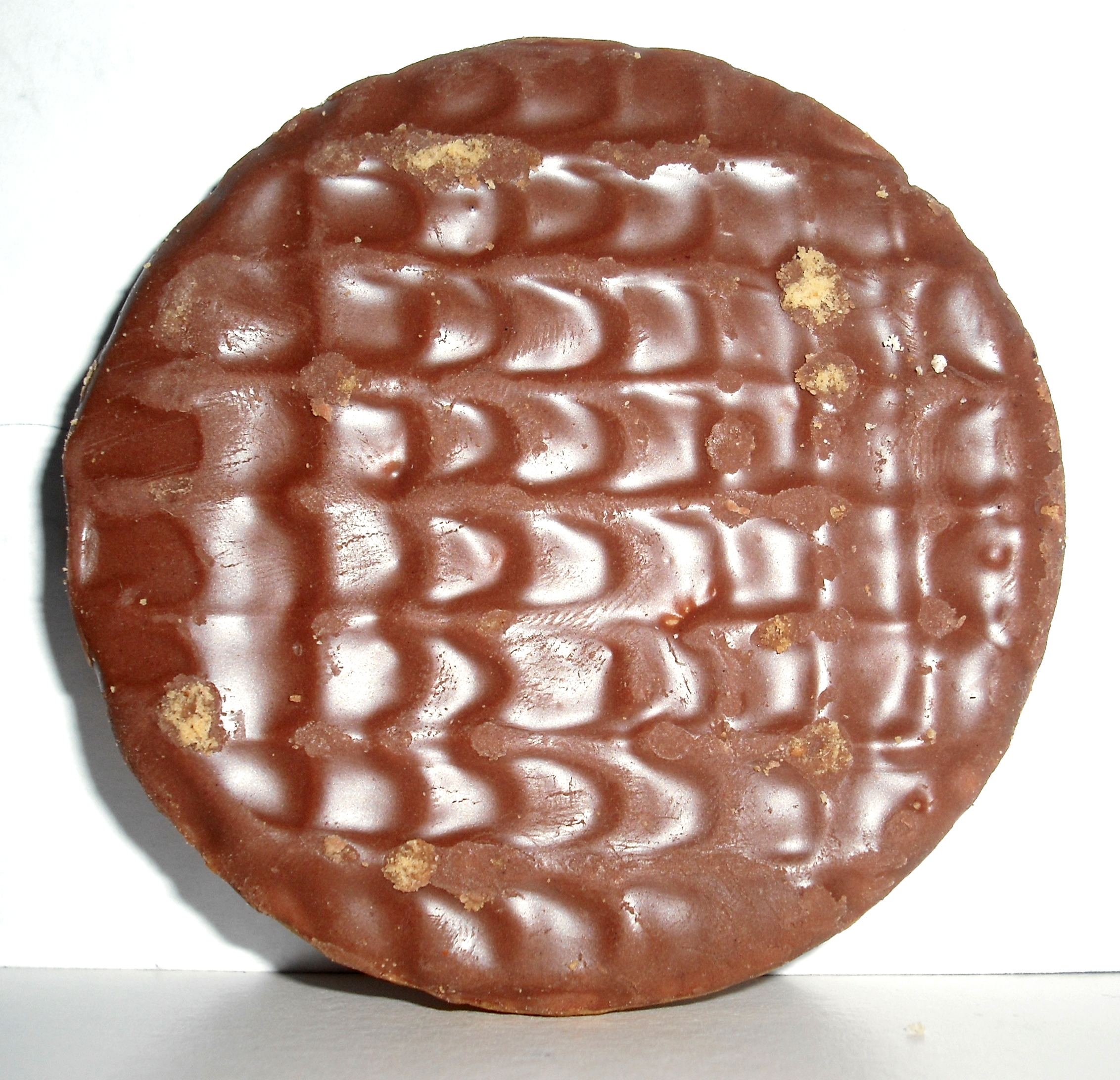
McVitie's chocolate digestive. First produced in 1925, travel writer Bill Bryson called it a “British masterpiece”. It is the UK's most popular biscuit to dunk into tea.

McVitie & Price's first major biscuit was the McVitie's digestive, created in 1892 by a new young employee at the company named Alexander Grant. The biscuit was given its name because it was thought that its high baking soda content served as an aid to food digestion. Grant later became managing director of the company. In 1923, he was the main benefactor in establishing the National Library of Scotland giving an endowment of £100,000. Grant donated a further £100,000 in 1928 to assist with the building of the National Library premises on George IV Bridge in Edinburgh. In 1924, Ramsay MacDonald, prime minister of Britain's new Labour Government, admitted that Grant had given him a Daimler car and £30,000 of shares in McVitie's. Grant had been MacDonald's childhood friend, and shortly after received a baronetcy (hereditary knighthood) from the prime minister. The affair, regarded by many as corruption by the prime minister, severely shook the government.

The McVitie's Chocolate Homewheat Digestive was created in 1925. Over 71 million packets of McVitie's chocolate digestives are eaten in the United Kingdom each year, equating to 52 biscuits per second. Hobnobs were launched in 1985 and a milk chocolate variant followed in 1987. Launched in 1927, Jaffa Cakes were ranked the best selling biscuit-sized cake in the UK in 2012.

=== 2002–present; Recent history ===
Some of the products in the McVitie's line were rebranded McV in 2002, but they were replaced in 2005 with a restyled version of the McVitie's brand logo. In 2007, United Biscuits licensed the McVitie's brand to Meiji Seika Kaisha Ltd for biscuit production in Japan. In 2009, McVitie's biscuits were voted as the most popular biscuits to dunk in tea, with McVitie's chocolate digestives, Rich tea, and Hobnobs ranked the country's top three favourite biscuits in 2009.

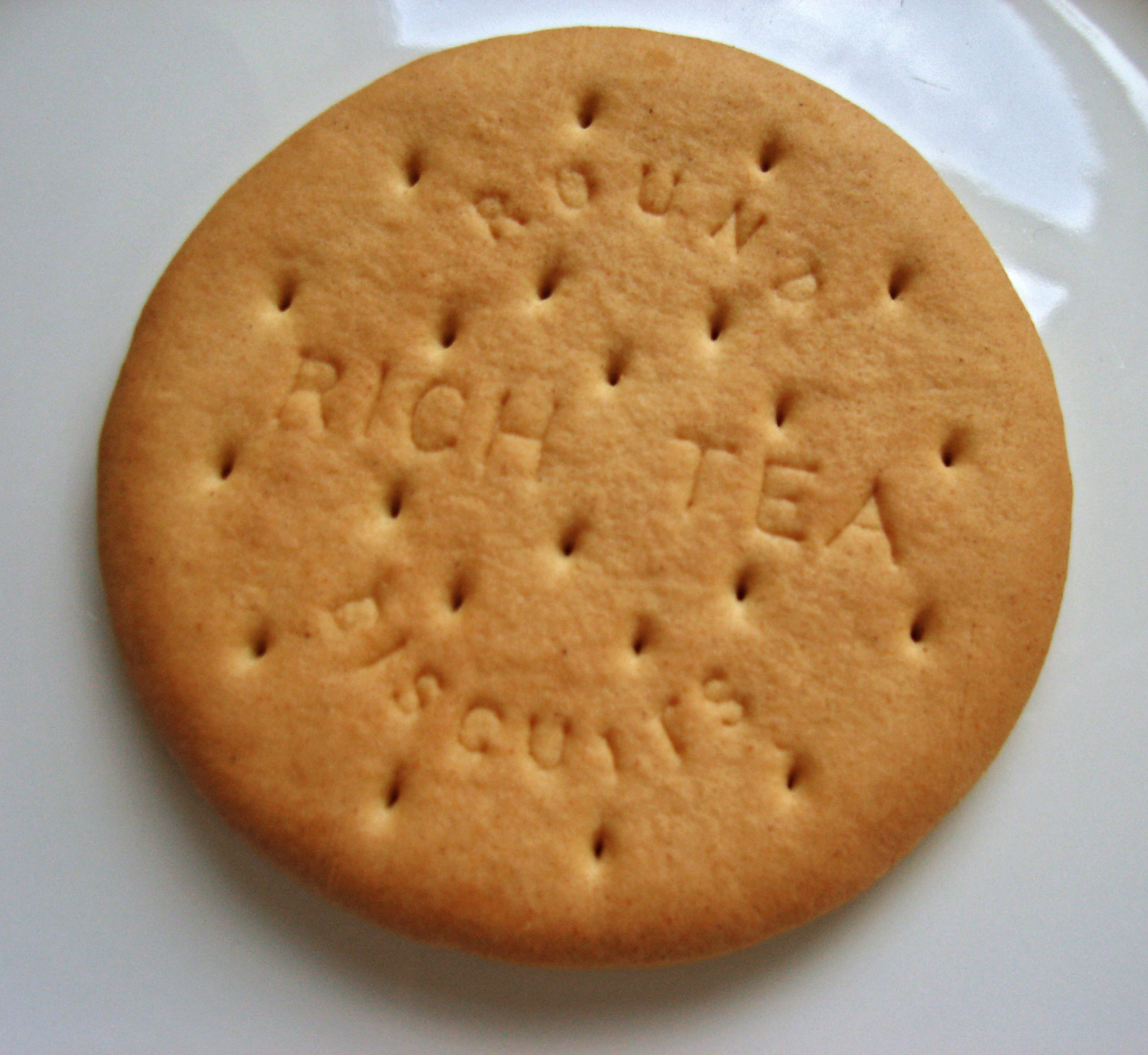
McVitie's Rich tea biscuits were launched in 1891.

In June 2014, McVitie's announced their intention to make 157 shop floor roles redundant at their Stockport manufacturing facility. This redundancy announcement was due to the modernisation agenda of the company and involved a move from an 8-hour 5-day operation to a 12-hour 7-day operation. In November 2014, United Biscuits, including McVitie's, was acquired by Yildiz Holding. In January 2016, Yildiz Holding brought together United Biscuits, Ülker, DeMet's Candy Company and Godiva under Pladis. United Biscuits' UK operating business subsequently became Pladis (UK) Limited.

In 2020, sales of McVitie's biscuits in the United Kingdom were more than five times their closest two competitors in the biscuit category (Kit Kat and Cadbury biscuits). In 2022, McVitie's ended 192 years of heritage and closed their last factory in Scotland, completely cutting ties with the brand's Scottish roots. The same year, McVitie's became the main sponsor of Britain's Got Talent. In 2023, McVitie's struck a deal to sponsor English championship football club Hull City.

== Wedding cakes ==
Although not their core operation, it is noteworthy that McVitie's were commissioned in 1893 to create a wedding cake for the royal wedding of the Duke of York and Princess Mary, who became King George V and Queen Mary. The cake was over 7 feet (2 metres) high and cost 140 guineas. It was viewed by 14,000 people and was important publicity for the company. Afterwards, the company received many commissions for royal wedding and christening cakes.

In 1947, McVitie & Price made the principal wedding cake for Princess Elizabeth (future Queen Elizabeth II) and Philip Mountbatten, which was served at the wedding breakfast. McVitie's were commissioned to make a chocolate biscuit cake as a groom's cake for the 2011 Wedding of Prince William and Catherine Middleton.

== Products ==
=== Biscuits ===
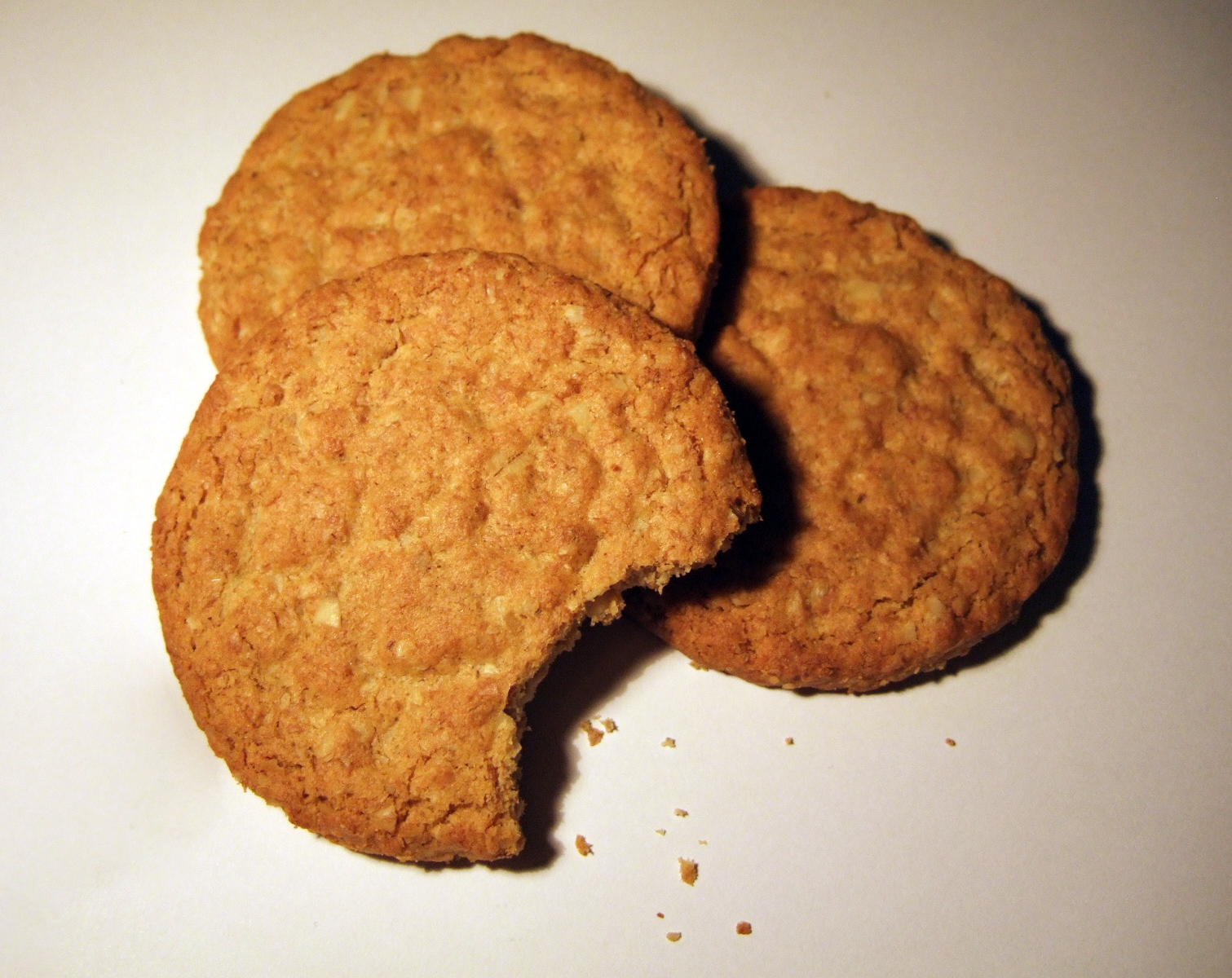
McVitie's launched Hobnobs (plain pictured) in 1985. The chocolate version (first produced in 1987) ranks high in UK polls for dunking.

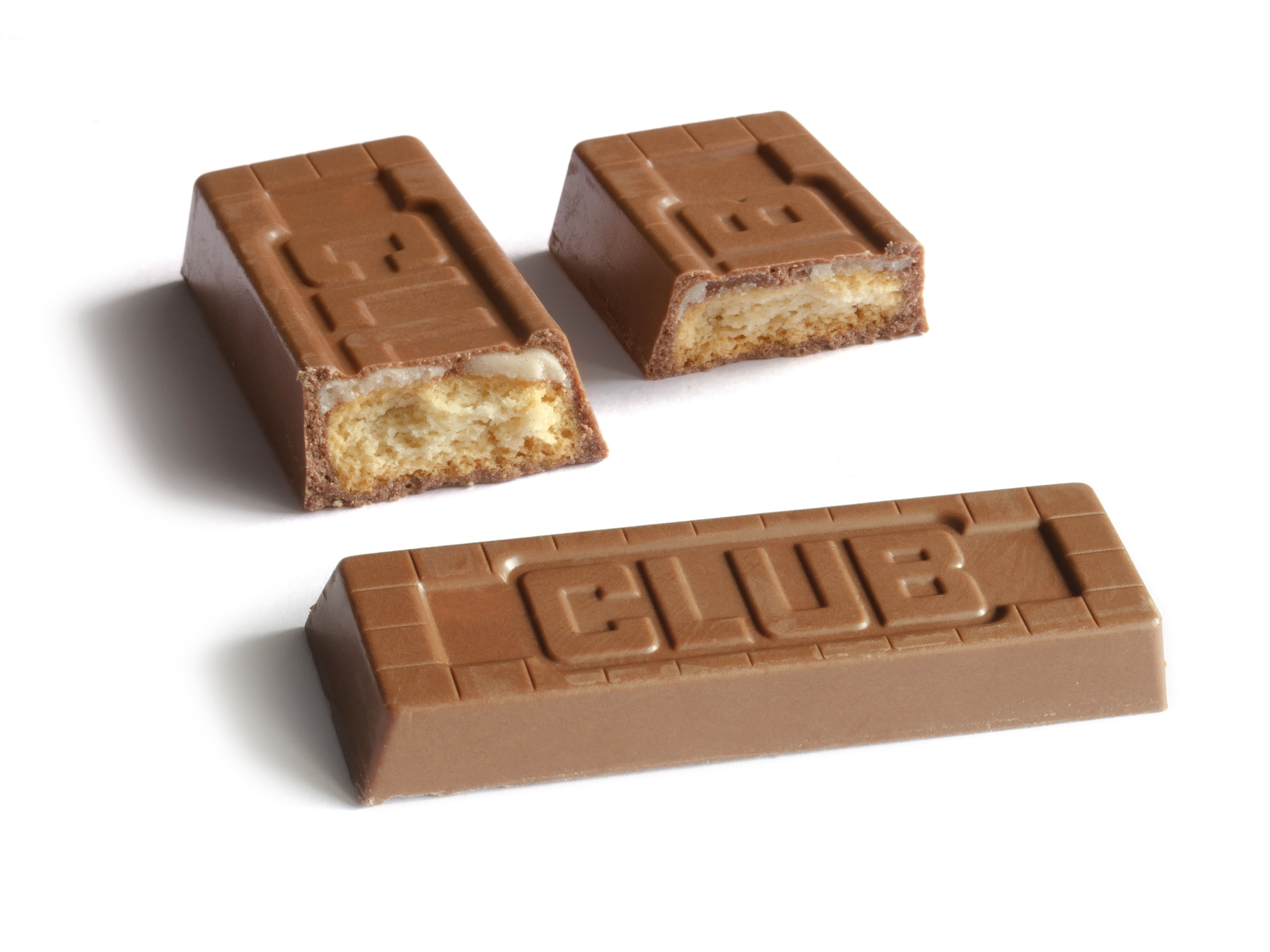
McVitie's-branded Club mint flavoured biscuit

- Abbey Crunch
- All Butter Shortbread
- BN
- Chocolate Digestives
- Club Biscuits.
- Cookies, including Boasters.
- Deli Choc
- Digestives
- Digestives Lights
- Fig Roll
- Fruit shortcake
- Ginger Nuts
- Gold Bar
- Hobnobs
- Iced Gems
- Marie finger biscuit
- Minis
- Penguin
- Rich Tea
- Tasties
- Taxi
- Trio
- United (discontinued)
- V.I.Bs (Very Important Biscuits)

=== Cakes ===
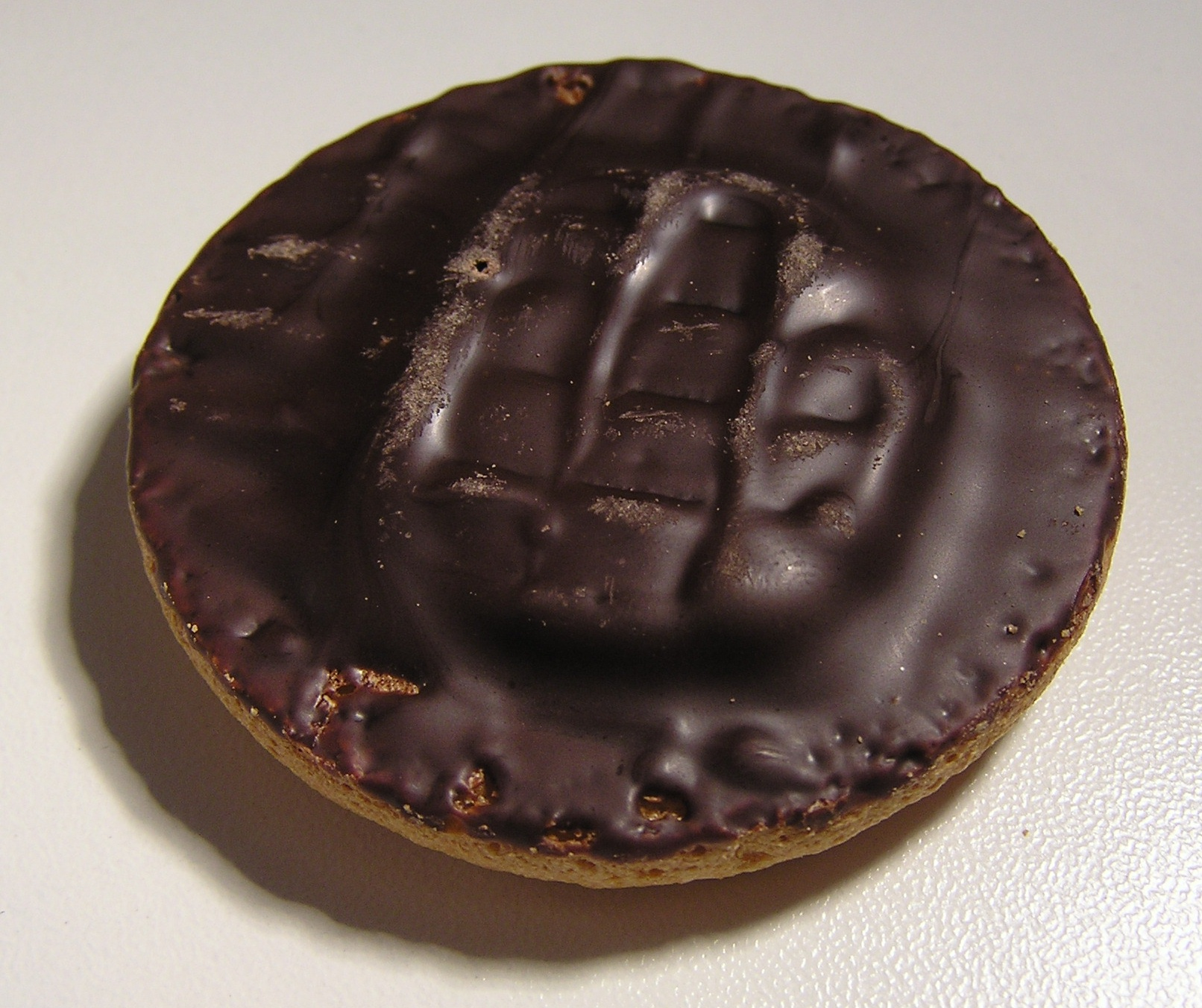
Classed a cake in a UK court ruling, McVitie's launched Jaffa Cakes in 1927.

- Carrot Cake
- Fruit cake
- Jaffa Cakes
- Jamaica Ginger Cake
- Lemon Cake
- Lyle's Golden Syrup Cake
- Mini Rolls
- Moments Brownies
- Tunis Cake
- Waffles

=== Other snacks ===
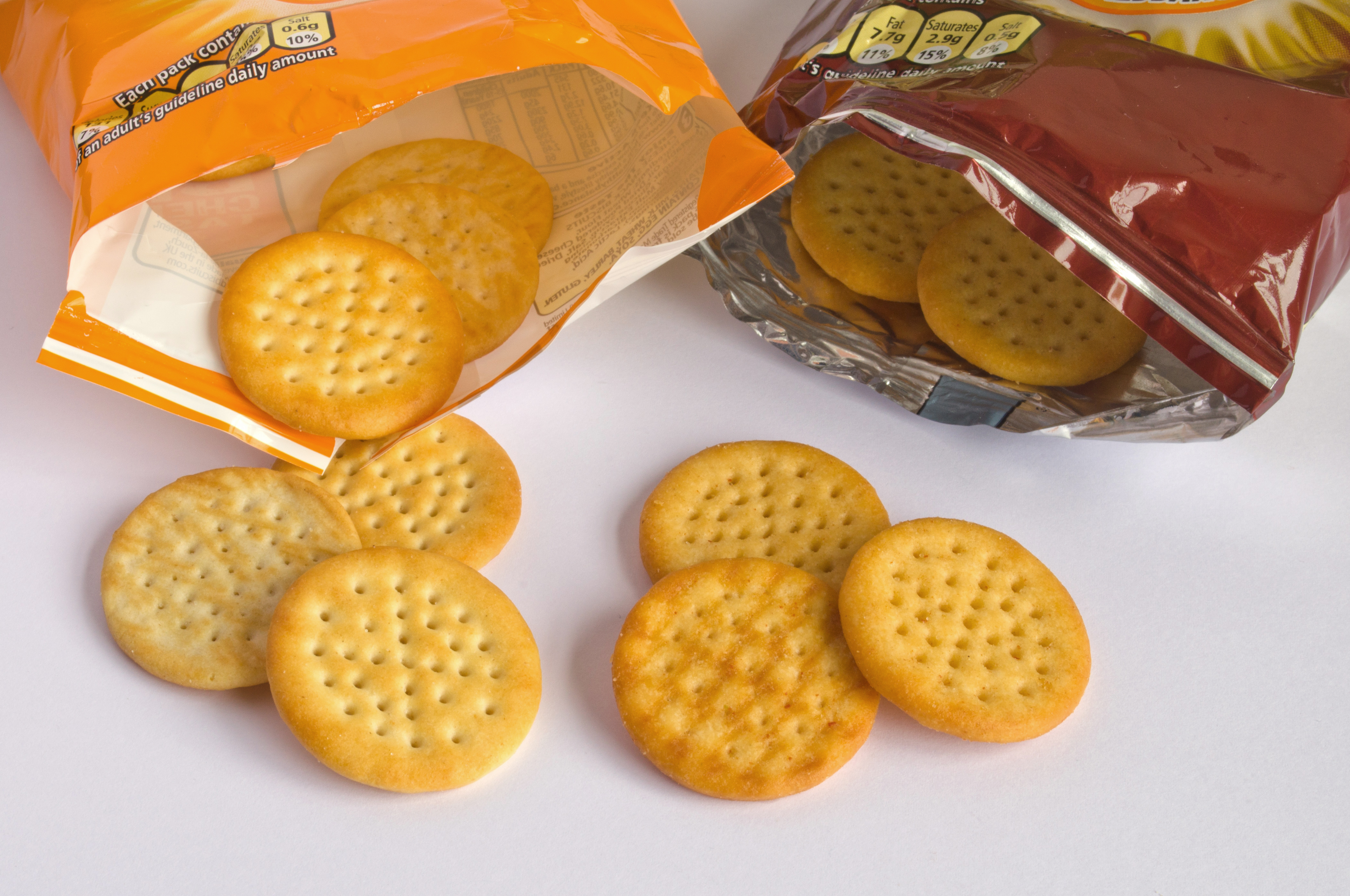
Mini Cheddars ("original" and "BBQ" flavours)

- Breakfast
- Cheddars
- Cracker Crisps
- Blissfills
- Digestive Thins
- Family Circle
- Krackawheats
- McVities Digestive Slices
- Minis
- Mini Cheddars
- Nibbles (Digestive and Hobnob varieties)
- Victoria Biscuit Selection

== See also ==
- Burton's Biscuit Company
- Fox's Biscuits
- Jacob Fruitfield Food Group
- Huntley & Palmers
- Sunshine Biscuits (Australia), a licensed manufacturer of McVitie's biscuits
