= Twiglets =

British snack brand shaped like twigs

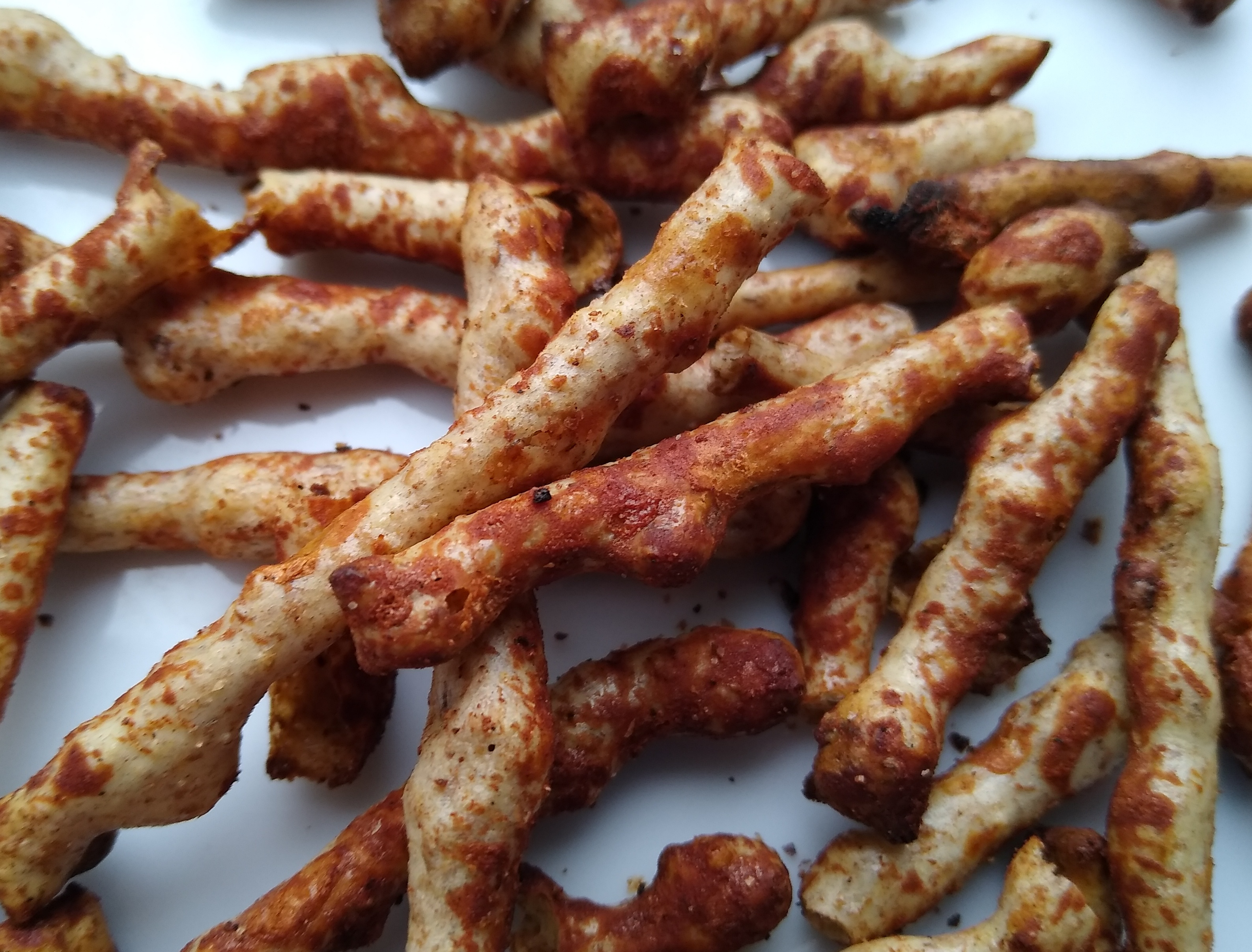
Twiglets

Twiglets are a wheat-based snack marketed in the United Kingdom that have a "distinctive knobbly shape" similar to that of twigs and a speckled-brown-over-pale-colour appearance. The taste of Twiglets, which has been compared to that of Marmite, primarily derives from the yeast extract used in the coating. Twiglets are packaged in 24 g, 45 g, 105 g, 150 g bags, and in 200 g cylindrical containers.

== History ==
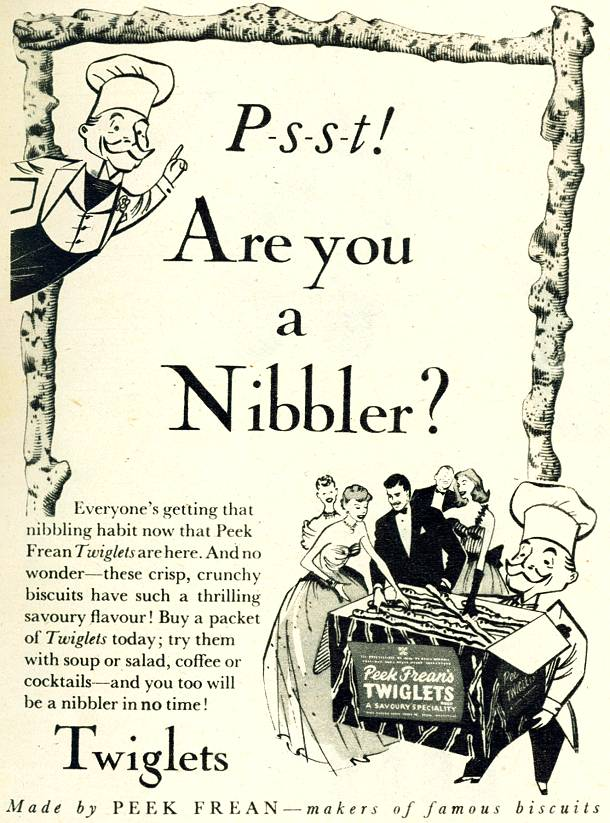
1930s advertisement for Twiglets featuring a caricature of the inventor, J. Rondalin

Twiglets were invented in 1929 by French biscuit maker J. Rondalin, a technical manager at Peek Freans' Bermondsey factory, who added brewer's yeast to a leftover batch of Vitawheat dough. They were first launched onto the consumer market in 1932 by Peek Freans. Today, Twiglets are manufactured in Aintree by United Biscuits subsidiary Jacob's.

During the Christmas season, Twiglets were traditionally sold in drum-shaped tin boxes as a high-class cocktail accompaniment from the 1930s until the 1970s. In modern times, the tin boxes have been substituted with large cardboard tubes decorated with seasonal themes.

In the early 1990s, a range of tangy Worcestershire sauce Twiglets were introduced. Jacobs also released a curry flavoured edition from 1999 to 2001, in collaboration with several Indian restaurant chains in Northern England. From 2010 until 2012, Tangy Twiglets were briefly re-released as a limited edition to commemorate Twiglets' 80th anniversary.

Twiglets used to be manufactured partly from grain prepared using hammer milling machinery located at the Parker Brothers Lark Roller Mills in Mildenhall. The machinery was powered by water turbines fed by water from the river Lark and this process created the broken grains that give Twiglets their crunchy irregular shape and texture. This water-powered mill operated until the last decade of the 20th century in this capacity.

To celebrate the 85th anniversary of Twiglets in August 2014, United Biscuits hosted an event known as Camp Twiglet on the Cotswolds farm of Blur's Alex James. This included three wigwams made from Twiglets which were attributed to a local artist named Mrs Cakehead.

== See also ==
- Liquorice allsorts
- Cheetos
- Nik Naks (British snack)
- Pirouline
