= Hasan Ülker =

Turkish-German footballer

Personal information
- Full name: Hasan Ülker
- Date of birth: 23 June 1995 (age 31)
- Place of birth: Wuppertal, Germany
- Height: 1.78 m (5 ft 10 in)
- Position: Midfielder

Team information
- Current team: Karagümrük

Youth career
- –2009: Wuppertaler SV
- 2009–2013: TSG Sprockhövel

Senior career*
Years	Team	Apps	(Gls)
2013–2015	TSG Sprockhövel	56	(13)
2015–2017	Hansa Rostock II	25	(14)
2015–2016	Hansa Rostock	11	(1)
2017–2018	Menemen Belediyespor	1	(0)
2018–	Karagümrük	0	(0)
- * Club domestic league appearances and goals as of 28 August 2017

Hasan Ülker (born 23 June 1995) is a Turkish-German footballer who plays as a midfielder for Turkish club Karagümrük.
