= Hüdai Ülker =

Hüdai Ülker (born 1951) is a Turkish German writer. She was born in Yugoslavia.

== Life ==
Ülker was born in 1951 in Štip. He studied mechanical sciences in İzmir, and later at the universities of Berlin and Anatolia. Since 1985, he's the Berlin's member of the Verband deutscher Schriftsteller (VS)

== Works ==
- Gurbet insanları, Izmir : Sanat-Koop Yayınları, 1983.
- Belgrad liegt hinter diesem Berg, Erzählungen 1985
- Meyhane. Zwei Erzählungen; Express Edition Berlin, 1986
- Annelieses Aufstand, Erzählungen 1988
- Ruhlar krali, İzmir: Anadolu Matbaacilik, 1996

== Prizes ==
- Literaturpreis der Volkshochschule Tiergarten/Kreuzberg, Berlin 1982
- Literaturpreis für Siemens-Mitarbeiter, Berlin 1988
