= AIB International =

International baking organization

Coordinates: 39°11′58″N 96°34′31″W

The American Institute of Baking, now known as AIB International, was founded in 1919 as a technology and information transfer center for bakers and food processors.

== Organization ==
Staff includes experts in the fields of baking production, experimental baking, cereal science, nutrition, food safety, and hygiene. AIB is headquartered in Manhattan, Kansas.
