= United Biscuits =

British food manufacturer

United Biscuits (UK) Limited
- Trade name: United Biscuits
- Formerly: United Biscuits (Holdings) plc
- Type: Subsidiary
- Traded as: LSE: UB
- Industry: Food
- Founded: 18 March 1948; 78 years ago
- Defunct: January 2016
- Successor: Pladis
- Headquarters: United Kingdom
- Products: Sweet and salty snacks
- Parent: Yıldız Holding

United Biscuits (UB) was a British multinational food manufacturer known for brands including McVitie's, Jacob's and Twiglets. The company was listed on the London Stock Exchange and was a constituent of the FTSE 100 Index until it was acquired by Finalrealm, a consortium of financial investors, in May 2000. It was bought by Yıldız Holding in November 2014. In January 2016, United Biscuits was brought together with Ülker, DeMet's Candy Company and Godiva under Pladis, Yildiz Holding's global snacking subsidiary.

United Biscuits manufactured in a number of countries across Europe, such as the Netherlands, France and Belgium. It also had a manufacturing site in India. The company's headquarters were in Chiswick Business Park in west London.

== History ==
United Biscuits (UB) was formed in 1948 by a merger of two Scottish family businesses: McVitie & Price and MacFarlane Lang. In 1962, United Biscuits acquired William Crawford & Sons, a Scottish baker founded in Leith in 1813, for £6 million. In 1965, the company also acquired William MacDonald & Sons for £2.8 million, and brought the Penguin brand to the group.

The company was listed on the London Stock Exchange as United Biscuits plc on 27 July 1948.

In 1972, United Biscuits acquired Carr's of Carlisle, makers of Table Water biscuits, from James Goldsmith's Cavenham Foods for £2.75 million. Two years later, in 1974, it acquired the US-based Keebler Company for $53 million. It also owned the Wimpy Bar fast food restaurant chain between 1977 and 1989, before selling it off to Burger King.

United Biscuits acquired the frozen food company Ross Young's from Hanson in 1988 for £335 million.

It sold Keebler for $500 million in 1995 after giving up efforts to break into the American market. In 1998 PepsiCo purchased Smith's Snackfood Company from United Biscuits.

United Biscuits was de-listed from the London Stock Exchange and acquired in May 2000 by Finalrealm, a consortium of financial investors, as well as Nabisco Holdings Corporation. As part of the transaction, UB acquired Nabisco's European businesses and divested several parts of its international business in Scandinavia, continental Europe, Asia (Keebler Malaysia and Singapore), several brands including TUC and 70% shareholding in Fazer Keksit (Biscuit) in Finland to Groupe Danone and Far East (China, Hong Kong, and Taiwan) to Nabisco. The company sold Young's Bluecrest in 2001, in order to concentrate on the sweet biscuit sector. In September 2004, United Biscuits bought the UK portion of Groupe Danone's Jacob's Biscuit Group for £240 million, including Cream Crackers and Twiglets. In July 2006, the company sold its Southern European biscuits business to Kraft Foods, which in turn left the owner syndicate.

In October 2006, MidOcean Partners sold the company to a consortium made up of the Blackstone Group and PAI Partners. The deal was completed in December 2006.

In December 2012, UB agreed the sale of its KP Snacks business to Intersnack for £500 million. On 3 November 2014, private equity funds managed by Blackstone and PAI Partners announced the sale of United Biscuits to Yıldız Holding.

== Brands ==
- Carr's
- Crawford's
- Tasties
- Delacre
- Verkade
- Go Ahead
- Wing Dings
- Flipper Dipper

=== Jacob's ===
- Biscuits for Cheese
- Mini Cheddars
- Cheddars
- Cheeselets
- Choice Grain
- Cornish Wafer
- Cream Crackers
- Essentials Crackers
- Mediterraneo
- Thai Bites
- Water Biscuits
- Twiglets
- Crinklys
- Oddities
- TUC (UK market only)

=== McVities ===
- Ginger Nuts
- Digestives
- Hobnobs
- BN
- Rich Tea
- Penguin
- Taxi (discontinued)
- Lyle's
- Mini Rolls
- Club
- Gold
- Iced Gems
- Happy Faces
- Jaffa Cakes
- United (discontinued)

== United Biscuits Network ==
The United Biscuits Network, a closed-circuit radio network serving their factories across the UK which was active from 1970 to 1979, spawned the career of UK radio presenter Steve Allen and TV and radio personality Dale Winton.

== In popular culture ==
In his 2009 book The Pleasures and Sorrows of Work, Alain de Botton chronicles his tour and brief experiences with employees of United Biscuits as they launched the "Moments" biscuit line.

== See also ==
- Burton's Biscuit Company
- Huntley & Palmers
- Jacob Fruitfield Food Group
- Tunnock's
