= Sabri Ülker =

Turkish businessman (1920–2012)

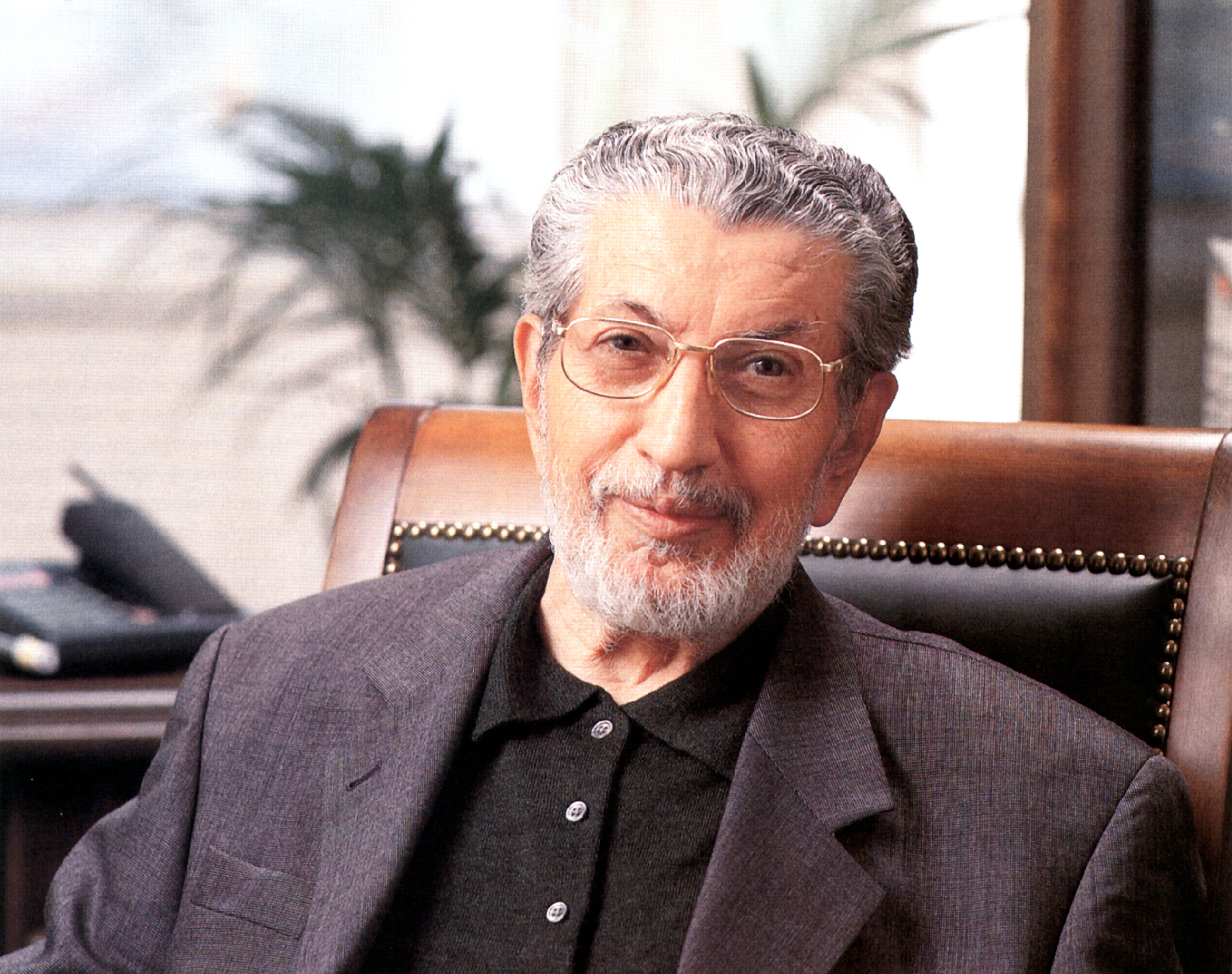
- Sabri Ülker
- Born: Sabri Berksan; 1920; Crimea
- Died: 12 June 2012 (aged 91–92); Istanbul, Turkey
- Resting place: Topkapi Cemetery, Istanbul
- Education: Marmara University
- Occupation: Businessman
- Known for: Founder, Ülker
- Spouse: Güzide Iman
- Children: 3, including Murat Ülker
- Website: sabriulker.com.tr

Sabri Ülker (1920 – 12 June 2012) was a Turkish industrialist and businessman, and the founder of Ülker.

== Early life ==
Sabri Ülker was born in 1920 in Crimea. His family is of Crimean Tatar origin and fled to Turkey to escape the Russian Civil War.

Having spent his early childhood in Crimea, Sabri Ülker immigrated to İstanbul 1929 together with his family.

== Education ==
Arriving in İstanbul at the age of 9, he started his education at Kadırga Elementary School.

After the elementary school, he studied at İstanbul High School for a brief period. Upon winning the right to attend the public boarding school during his 2nd year at junior high, he went to Bilecik. He graduated from Bilecik Junior High School and then Kütahya High School. During World War 2, he had his college degree at Sultanahmet Academy of Economics and Commerce (Marmara University, today).

== Career ==
He founded the Ülker company in 1944. It became known as Yıldız Holding in 1989.

Ülker has also led social development projects. He was among the founders of the Turkish Foundation for Combating Soil Erosion (TEMA).

== Personal life ==
He was married to Güzide Iman, born in Balıkesir in 1924, the daughter of a tradesman father Muharrem İman, and his wife Sabih. They had three children, Ali Ülker, who died young, Ahsen Özokur and Murat Ülker.

He died on 12 June 2012.

== Legacy ==
The Sabri Ülker Center at the Harvard T.H. Chan School of Public Health in Cambridge, Massachusetts is named in his honor.

=== Awards in his name ===
- Sabri Ülker Environment Award
- Sabri Ülker Science Award
