= Godiva Chocolatier =

Belgian-based chocolaterie

- Type: Subsidiary
- Industry: Confectionery production
- Founded: 1926
- Founder: Joseph Draps
- Headquarters: 333 West 34th Street, New York City, U.S.
- Area served: Worldwide
- Products: Food and Beverage (Chocolate and Coffee)
- Owner: Yıldız Holding (as Pladis); MBK Partners (Japan, South Korea, Australia, New Zealand)
- Parent: Campbell's (1974-2007); Yıldız Holding (2007–present)
- Website: www.godiva.com

Godiva Chocolatier (/ɡəˈdaɪvə/; French pronunciation: [gɔdiva]) is a multinational chocolate maker owned by Turkish conglomerate Yıldız Holding and operating as part of Pladis, Yildiz's global snack and confectionery subsidiary.

Founded in Belgium in 1926, it was purchased in 1974 by American food manufacturer Campbell Soup Company, which owned and operated the company until its sale to Yıldız in November 2007. In 2019, South Korean private equity firm MBK Partners purchased Tokyo-based Godiva Japan, operations in South Korea, Australia, and New Zealand as well as a production facility in Belgium for a deal valued at over US$1 billion.

In 2019, Godiva had planned to open 2,000 Cafés worldwide over the next 6 years, a concept that would introduce more coffee chain-type products including espresso drinks and croissant sandwiches. However, in January 2021, Godiva announced it would close all its 128 brick-and-mortar locations across North America by the end of March 2021, due to the lockdowns and restrictions of the COVID-19 pandemic drastically reducing in-person shopping, but would maintain wholesale operations.

Godiva has factories in Turkey, the United States, and Belgium. Chocolate sold in the United States is manufactured exclusively at facilities in Reading, Pennsylvania, and Turkey. In 2019, a class action lawsuit alleged Godiva falsely marketed its chocolate as being made in Belgium. In 2022, a United States District court approved a settlement of the case in which Godiva agreed to pay up to $15 million to consumers who filed claims.

Since 2024, the Yıldız-owned portion of Godiva operates as a subsidiary of confectionery and snack foods company Pladis.

== History ==
=== Family-run business ===
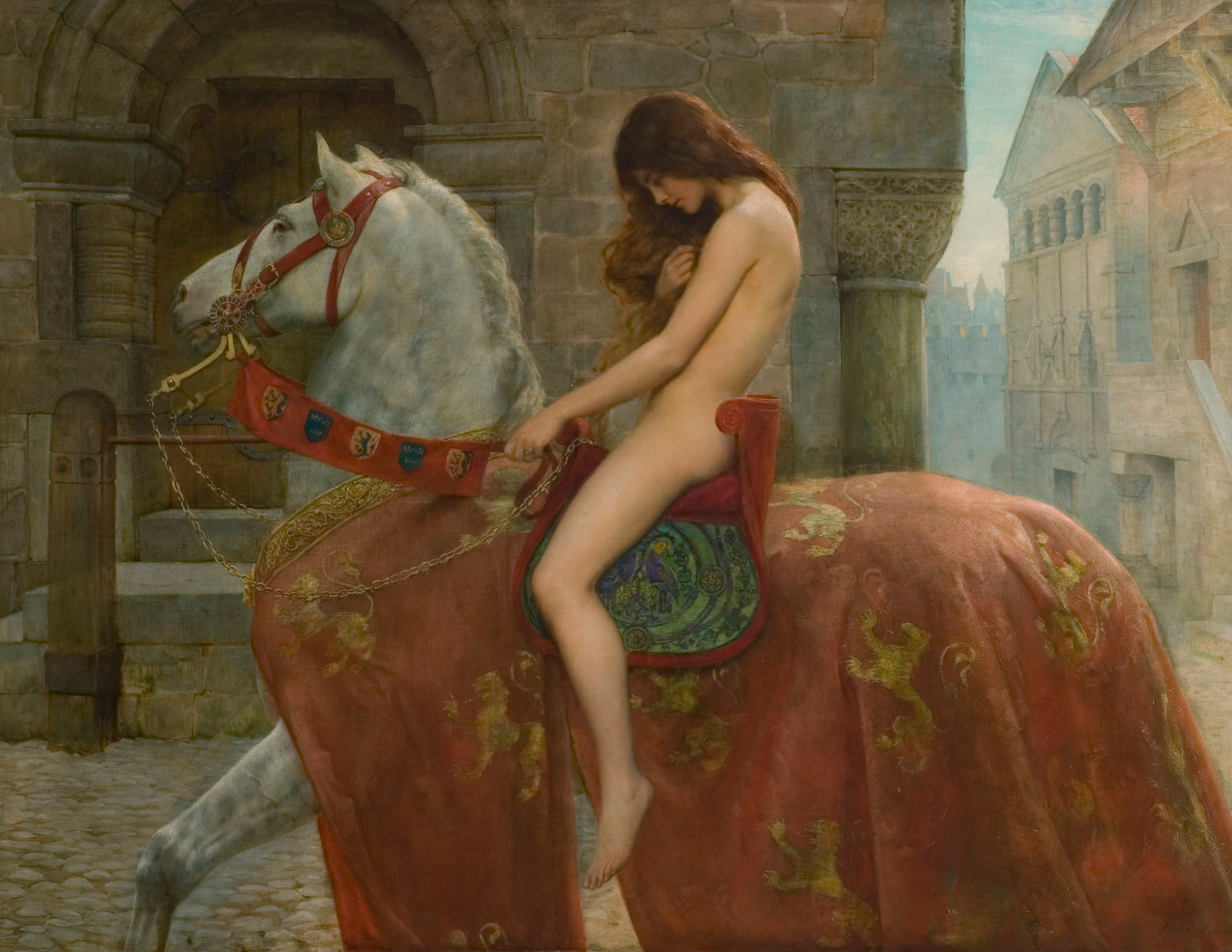
Lady Godiva, 1897 painting by John Collier

Godiva's origins begin in Brussels in 1926 when Pierre Draps began making pralines at a home-workshop to sell in the Belgian department store Sarma, among other retailers. Pierre's three sons, Joseph, Francois, and Pierre Jr., all learned and worked for the family business from an early age. After Pierre's death shortly before World War II, his three sons continued the workshop on the ground floor of the family home in Molenbeek.

In 1945, the Draps began using the brand name “Godiva.” The name was an idea from Joseph Draps' wife Gabrielle, in reference to the English noblewoman Lady Godiva. The brothers opened their first shop shortly afterward in the Brussels municipality of Koekelberg (on Boulevard Léopold II). Less than 6 months later, a second shop followed in Knokke.

By 1958, Godiva had twenty stores in Belgium and opened its first shop outside Belgium in Paris on the Rue Saint Honoré. That same year, Godiva's chocolates gained international exposure during the 1958 World Exhibition in Brussels.

=== Acquisition by Campbell Soup Company ===
In 1966, the Campbell Soup Company acquired a one-third stake in Godiva and began distributing the products in the United States for the first time, where they were sold at shopping centers. Campbell operated a manufacturing facility in Reading, Pennsylvania, to produce Godiva chocolate for the American market. In 1972, the first Godiva shop in North America was opened on New York City's Fifth Avenue. That same year, Godiva chocolates became available in Japan in a department store in central Tokyo. In 1974, full ownership of Godiva was sold by the Draps Family to the Campbell Soup Company. In the decades following, Campbell greatly expanded Godiva's presence in the United States and around the world.

=== Yıldız Holding Ownership ===
By 2007, Godiva had annual sales of approximately $500 million. In August of that year, the Campbell Soup Company announced it was exploring strategic alternatives, including possible divestiture, for its Godiva Chocolatier business; the company said the "premium chocolate business does not fit with Campbell's strategic focus on simple meals". In December 2007, Campbell announced that it entered into an agreement to sell Godiva to Yıldız Holding, which is based in Istanbul, Turkey, and which also owns the Ülker group and the largest consumer goods manufacturer in Turkey. The acquisition was completed in March 2008 for $850 million.

According to AFR on October 31, 2017, Godiva continued to own and operate more than 450 shops worldwide.

In May 2012, Godiva opened Café Godiva in London's Harrods department store, which offers Godiva's chocolate beverages, pastries and chocolates (the café permanently closed by 2022). The company also has a store in the Harrods Food Hall.

In 2016, Godiva celebrated its 90th anniversary and opened its 100th store in China. In 2017, the business opened its first store in Australia, inaugurated its Pierre Draps Chocolate Research & Development Centre in Brussels and opened its North American flagship store at Rockefeller Center in Midtown Manhattan. In 2018, Godiva opened its first café-concept in Brussels (permanently closed by 2022).

In Japan in February 2018, Godiva took out a full-page ad in the Nihon Keizai Shimbun financial newspaper, recommending the retirement of the giri choco practice. As part of this practice, women are expected to buy chocolate for their male colleagues, friends, bosses and sometimes family members on St. Valentine's Day. The public's reaction to the ad was generally seen as favorable though some accused the ad as a stealth marketing ploy.

=== Ownership and operations in four countries sold to MBK Partners ===
In 2019, a Korean private equity firm, MBK Partners agreed to purchase Godiva’s operations in Japan, South Korea, and Australia (and rights to future expansion in New Zealand) as well as its production facility in Belgium. Yıldız would retain the brand ownership in all markets, granting a perpetual license for use of the brand to MBK Partners. The transaction details were not disclosed, but estimated to be 1 to 1.5 billion USD.

=== Two companies, one brand ===
==== Yıldız ====
In 2019 Yıldız's Godiva opened its first café-concept location in New York City, with plans to open 2,000 more around the world over the next 6 years. In 2021, the company announced the cancellation of its plans to pursue its café concept and the closing of all its physical locations in North America. Godiva also closed most of its retail locations in Europe.

In April 2024, the Yıldız-owned portion of Godiva was integrated into the confectionery and snack foods company Pladis, a subsidiary of Yıldız formed in 2016.

Its biggest markets are the US and China.

==== MBK Partners ====
MBK Partners independently own and operate Godiva in Japan, South Korea and Australia, including 300+ shops selling a variety of products including chocolate, biscuits, cake, ice cream, and drinks. Since 2021, the company has expanded into cafés and bakeries under the Godiva branding.

== Civic engagement ==
The company is a participating member of the World Cocoa Foundation and Cocoa Horizons Foundation, and a partner of Save the Children. Godiva began The Lady Godiva Program, which partnered with FEED Projects in its first year. Godiva also partners with the Earthworm Foundation to continue their commitment to ensuring the sustainability of the cocoa industry and is in agreement with the Cocoa & Forests Initiative to stop deforestation and forest degradation concerning the production of cocoa.

With its Seeds for Progress Foundation, Godiva facilitates access to education for children living in coffee-growing communities. In 2020, the company announced the launch of The Lady Godiva Initiative, which is Godiva's pledge to annually honour and award $25,000 grants to five non-governmental organizations (NGOs) in the United States, Canada, Belgium, England and China that are doing the work of empowering women.

== Locations ==
In 2016, Godiva had approximately 650 retail stores throughout the world. Godiva's global presence increased rapidly, especially in such non-Western countries as China and Japan.

In 2021, Godiva announced that it would close its 128 stores in North America because of decreased mall traffic sales; customers could instead purchase products through Godiva's online marketplace and through grocery, club, and retail partners. While not widely announced, Godiva closed most of its locations across Europe as well.

As of March 2025, Godiva maintained eight locations across Europe - three in London, two in Brussels, and three in Portugal. The company has a far more significant presence in Asia, including China, Hong Kong, Singapore, Malaysia, Indonesia, and Turkey, among other countries.

MBK Partners operates Godiva stores, including cafes and bakeries, across Japan, South Korea, and Australia. As of March 2025, it has over 300 locations in Japan, 35 in Korea, and 8 in Australia.

== Manufacturing ==
Godiva has factories in Brussels, in Reading, Pennsylvania, and in Turkey. Godiva chocolate sold in the United States has been manufactured in Reading, Pennsylvania, since the 1960s and adjusted for US tastes. Currently, most of the chocolate sold in the USA is made in Turkey. Since 2024 Godiva chocolate has been unavailable in Israel due to Turkey banning all exports to Israel.

In 2017, Yıldız changed its global manufacturing to end the use of alcohol in the chocolate liquor used for pralines, enabling Halal certification. Godiva available in the United States had already always been made without alcohol to comply with state laws restricting alcohol in candy.

== Legal disputes and controversies ==
=== Legal dispute against Geneva pub ===
Lawyers of the company have sent a series of letters warning the Lady Godiva pub in Geneva, Switzerland, that they are infringing upon the chocolatier’s intellectual property, with the latest asking the pub to cease and desist from using the name. Pru Porretta, who was behind the revival of Dame Goodyver's Daye in Coventry, England, where a procession through the city's streets includes Porretta representing Lady Godiva riding a horse, commented, "I think it's very sad. Godiva was a great woman who challenged her husband to stop the terrible things that were happening to the people. I'm sure Lady Godiva wouldn't care for a company which seems to be taking something that wasn't theirs originally and wants to use it for themselves and nobody else. It's about our rich heritage. I would say it's morally wrong".

As of 2025, Lady Godiva English Pub has continued operating in Geneva. Godiva chocolatier has no retail locations in Switzerland.

=== Misleading marketing and false advertising ===
Godiva has been accused of falsely advertising its products as made in Belgium in markets in which this is not the case, including the United States. The company has also been owned and operated by non-Belgian food conglomerates since the 1970s. Despite this, Godiva prominently features the text "Belgium 1926" as part of its logo, labels some of its products as Belgian, uses phrases like "Belgian craftsmanship", and implies or claims it is still a Belgian company in its marketing materials.

In 2019, a class action lawsuit in the United States was filed against Godiva alleging false and misleading marketing. In 2022, a New York District court approved a settlement in which Godiva agreed to pay up to $15 million to consumers who filed claims. Six state attorneys general sent the judge a letter outlining concerns that the terms of the deal allowed Godiva to artificially depress claims, resulting in a claims rate of less than 3% as well as efforts by Godiva to invalidate claims post-settlement.

=== Child labor ===
Godiva has been involved in a controversy over chocolate manufacturers' use of child labor in the production of cocoa. Among major global chocolate manufacturers, Godiva was rated the worst in efforts to reduce child labor in their supply chains.

=== Heavy metals found in chocolate ===
Godiva's milk chocolate was found to be heavily contaminated with nickel in a laboratory test done by the German consumer institute Stiftung Warentest in 2018. A 2022 Consumer Reports investigation found certain dark chocolate bars, including Godiva, have high enough levels of lead that a single ounce per day would put an adult over the level deemed harmful by public health authorities. In 2023, a class action lawsuit was filed alleging Godiva's dark chocolate contains unsafe lead levels.

Gallery
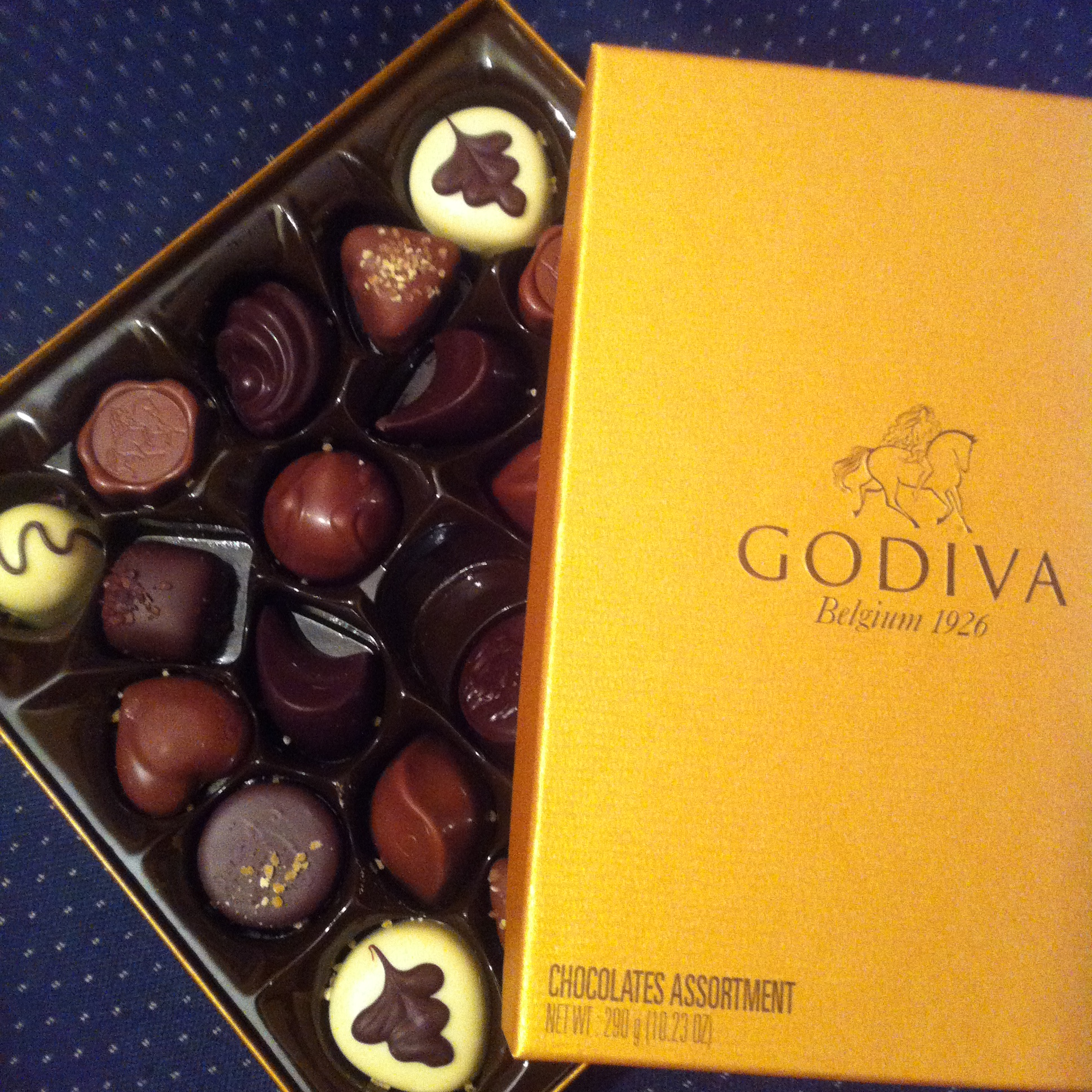
Godiva Golden Box 24 pralinen

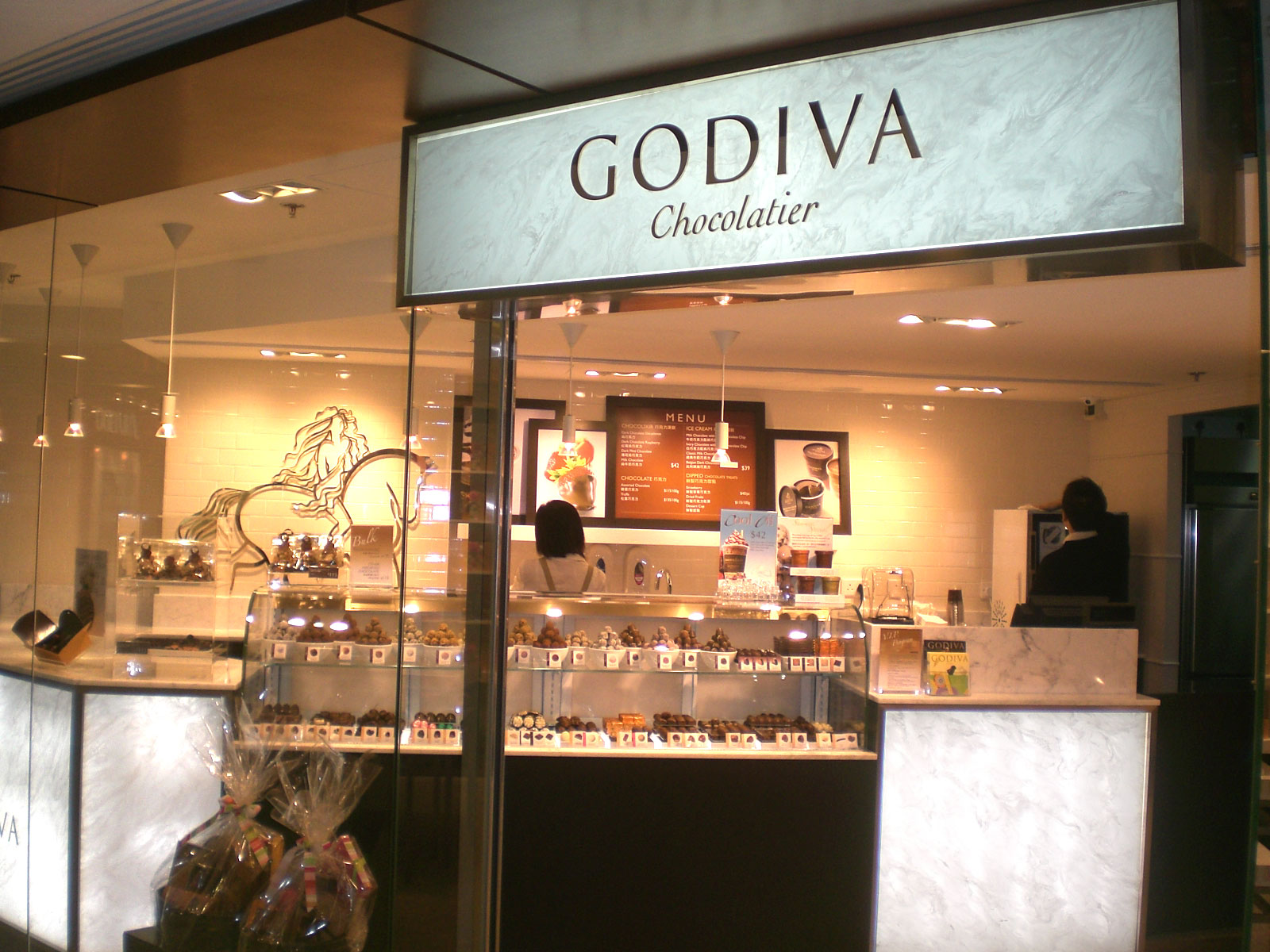
A Hong Kong branch

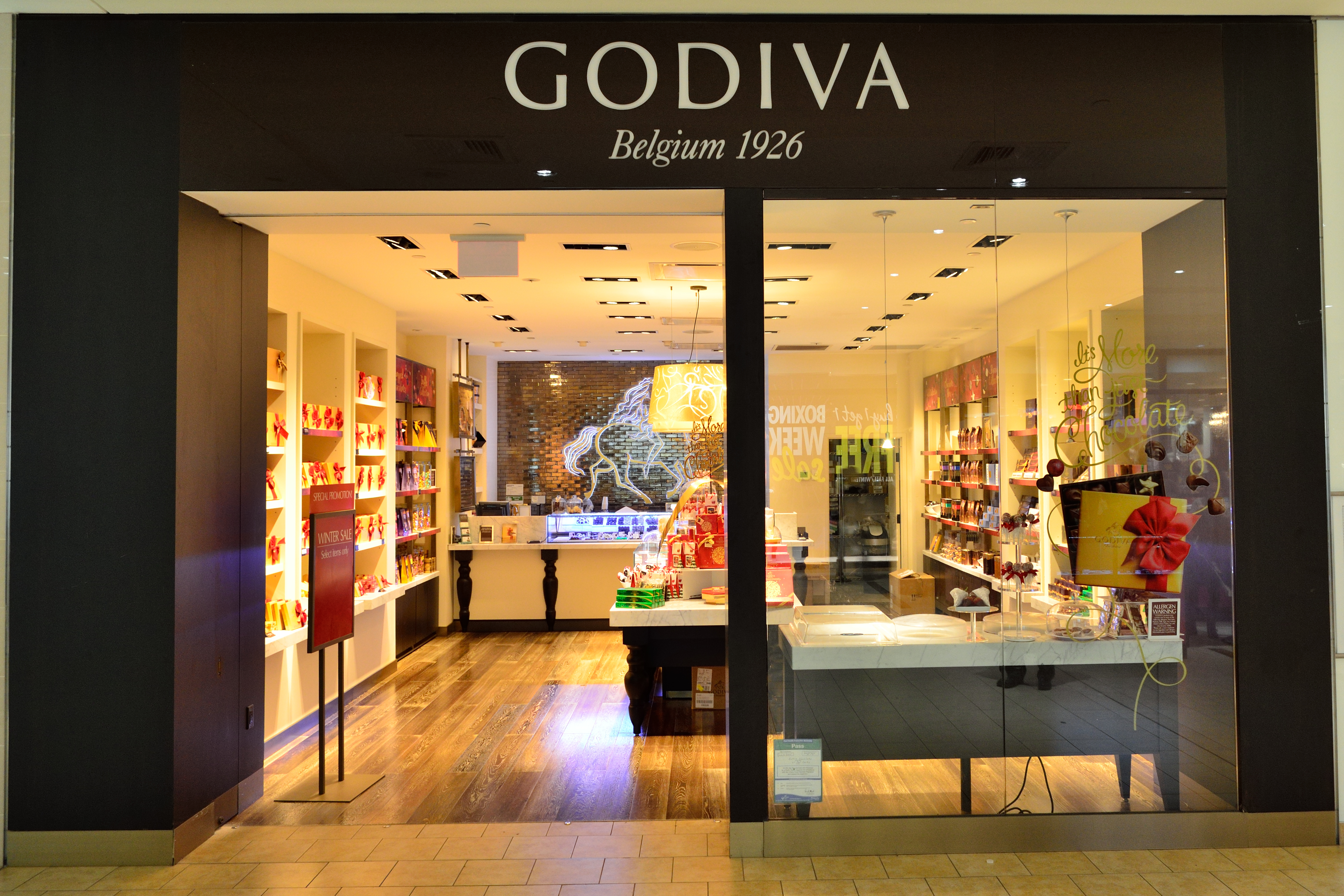
A Godiva store in North America

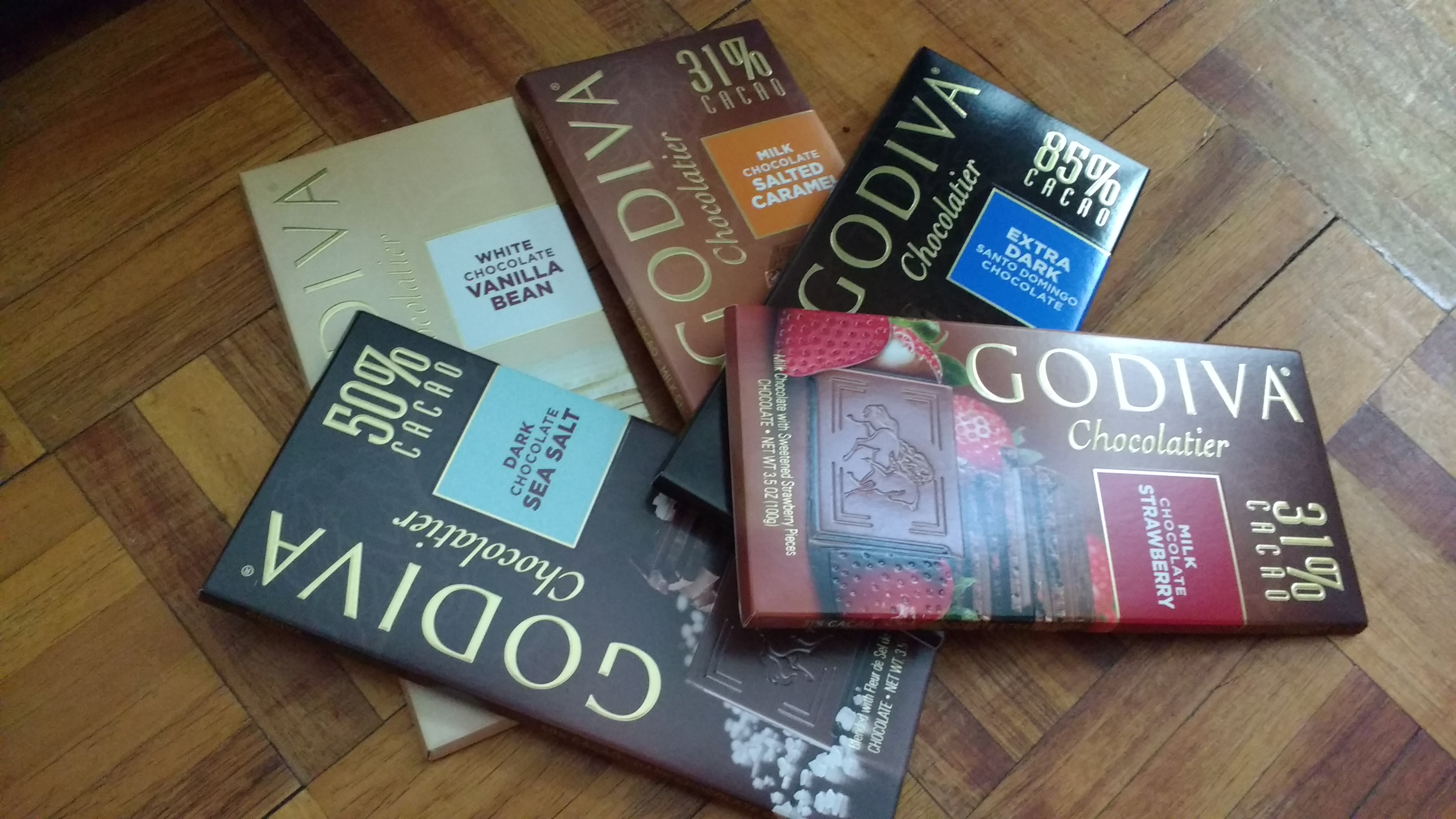
Godiva chocolates, in Brussels, Belgium

== See also ==
- Belgian chocolate
- List of bean-to-bar chocolate manufacturers
