= Ülker =

Turkish multinational food manufacturer

Ülker Bisküvi Sanayi A.Ş.
- Type: Anonim Şirket
- Traded as: BİST: ULKER
- Industry: Food processing
- Founded: 22 February 1944; 82 years ago
- Founder: Sabri Ülker; Asım Ülker
- Headquarters: Istanbul, Turkey
- Area served: Worldwide
- Key people: Ali Ülker (Chairman); Mehmet Tütüncü (CEO)
- Products: Baby food, breakfast cereals coffee, confectionery, dairy products, ice cream and soft drink
- Revenue: ▲US$2.30 billion (2024)
- Operating income: ▼US$388 million (2024)
- Net income: ▲US$218 million (2024)
- Total assets: ▲US$2.76 billion (2024)
- Total equity: ▲US$950 million (2024)
- Number of employees: 10,154 (2023)
- Parent: Yıldız Holding
- Subsidiaries: List: Biskot Bisküvi Ülker Çikolata Sanayi A.Ş. İstanbul Gıda Atlas Gıda Birleşik Dış Ticaret A.Ş. Atlantik Gıda Rekor Gıda Godiva Belgium BVBA G New Inc.
- Website: www.ulker.com.tr/en

Ülker is a Turkish multinational food and beverage manufacturer based in Istanbul, Turkey. Its products are exported internationally, to 110 countries. Ülker's core products are biscuits, cookies, crackers, and chocolates, although it has expanded to other categories.

Ülker received the "Candy Company of the Year in Europe" award from the European Candy Kettle Club in 2004.

In 2016, Yıldız Holding brought together Ülker, United Biscuits, DeMet's Candy Company and Godiva under Pladis, its global snacking subsidiary, and transferred 51% of Ülker's shares to Pladis.

== History ==
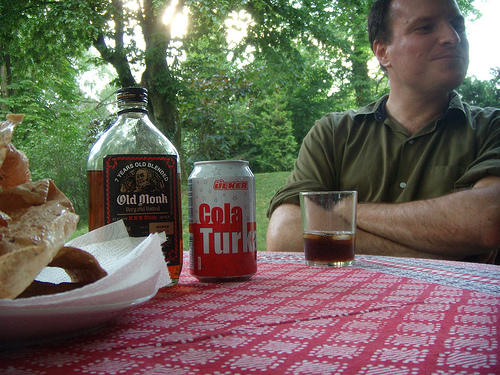
A can of Cola Turka

Ülker was founded in 1944 by Sabri and Asım Ülker, two brothers whose parents immigrated to Turkey from Crimea, commencing operations in Istanbul as a small bakery. A factory was opened in 1948. Ülker expanded in the 1970s to exporting to the Middle East market, chocolate manufacturing, and packaging. By the end of the 20th century, Ülker was manufacturing margarine, vegetable oil, and dairy products. In 2003, it introduced Cola Turka, a competitor to Coca-Cola. The advertisement for Cola Turka featured actor Chevy Chase, and according to local sources Coca-Cola cut 10% off its prices due to the success of the Cola Turka launch. In 2015 Ülker disposed of its drinks business.

Fulya Banu Sürücü was appointed as the CFO of the company on January 3, 2022.

== See also ==
- List of food companies
- Yıldız Holding
- Pladis
