= DeMet's Candy Company =

American food company

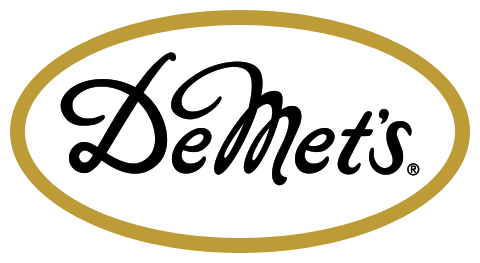
- Type: Private
- Industry: Food
- Founded: 1898
- Founder: George DeMet
- Successor: Pladis North America, Inc.
- Headquarters: United States
- Brands: Flipz; Turtles
- Parent: Yıldız Holding

DeMet's Candy Company was a United States confectionery company associated with Turtles and Flipz. In 2013, Brynwood Partners sold DeMet's to Yıldız Holding. In January 2016, Yildiz Holding brought DeMet's together with United Biscuits, Ülker and Godiva under Pladis. DeMet's Candy Company was subsequently renamed Pladis North America, Inc.

== History ==
DeMet's started in 1898 as a candy store business and soda fountain shop by George DeMet of Chicago, subsequently creating Turtles candies in 1918. After a series of mergers and acquisitions, DeMet’s was purchased by Nestlé in 1988.

In 2007, Signature Snacks acquired the DeMet’s brand from Nestlé.

In 2007, Brynwood Partners bought the "Turtles" brand from Nestlé USA Inc., acquiring at the same time the 280,000-square-foot (26,000 m^{2}) Turtles production facility in Toronto, Canada.

Subsequently, Brynwood consolidated its portfolio of confectionery acquisitions, which included Stixx, Flipz chocolate covered pretzels, Treasures, and Turtles, resurrecting the dormant DeMet's Candy Company name. DeMet's acquired the TrueNorth brand of nut snacks from Frito-Lay in 2010 but sold it to B&G Foods in 2013.

In 2013, Brynwood sold the company to Yıldız Holding.

In January 2016, Yildiz Holding brought DeMet's Candy Company together with United Biscuits, Ülker and Godiva under Pladis, its new global snacking subsidiary. DeMet's Candy Company was subsequently renamed Pladis North America, Inc. Brands Turtles and Flipz now form part of the Pladis brand portfolio.
