= Yıldız Holding =

Turkish conglomerate

- Type: Private
- Founded: 1944; 82 years ago
- Founder: Sabri Ülker and Asim Ülker
- Headquarters: Istanbul, Turkey
- Area served: Worldwide
- Key people: Murat Ülker (Chairman); Ali Ülker (Vice Chairman); Mehmet Tütüncü (CEO)
- Products: Biscuits, chocolate, cakes, candies, chewing gums, frozen foods, processed meats, oil, personal care
- Revenue: ▲US$13.5 billion (2023)
- Owner: Ülker Family
- Number of employees: 80,000 (2023)
- Subsidiaries: Godiva; McVitie's; Pladis; Şok; Ülker
- Website: www.yildizholding.com.tr/en/

Yıldız Holding is a Turkish conglomerate that is best known for manufacturing food products. The company also produces other consumer goods and has its own retail, private equity and real estate operations.

Its core biscuit and confectionery brands operate globally under Pladis, a subsidiary formed in 2016. Yıldız Holding is among the largest food manufacturers in CEEMEA (Europe, the Middle East, and Africa), the company generated revenues of ₺391 billion (US$13.5 billion) in 2023 across all businesses. The company employs 80,000 people and has 42 factories (20 of which are outside Turkey).

Yıldız Holding has over 300 brands available in 5 continents reaching 4 billion people. Through Yıldız Holding's core focus on biscuits, cakes and confectionery, the company has become number two in the world in the sweet biscuits category and number seven in the chocolate category by revenue.

== History ==
=== 1940s ===
Sabri and Asim Ülker, whose parents migrated from the Crimea to Turkey, began manufacturing biscuits in 1944. The company opened its first factory in Topkapı in 1948 and its first biscuit factory in 1965.

=== 1970s ===
The 1970s was a period of expansion, with the company moving biscuit production to Ankara in 1970. Ulker produced chocolate for the first time in 1972, which proved so popular that a dedicated chocolate factory was built in Istanbul in 1974. In the same year, the company began exporting to the Middle East and opened its own R&D division in order to compete with international competitors.

=== 1980s ===
The company began manufacturing some of its own equipment in the 1980s. In 1984 the Topkapı Makine facility was founded to create the machines required for biscuit and chocolate production within the group.

In 1989, Yıldız Holding was created to consolidate all operations and businesses within the group.

=== 1990s ===
Yıldız Holding continued to expand its operations, entering the margarine, vegetable oil and industrial food oil market in 1992 and the dairy industry in 1996.

The company also increased its international expansion, partnering with Cerestar to form Pendik Nişasta in 1993, producing the first cake bars and filled cakes in Turkey. It sold its share of the company in 2021.

=== 2000s ===
Yıldız acquired premium chocolatier Godiva Chocolatier in 2008.

Yıldız began producing ice cream, baby food, soda and cola-style beverages and instant coffee. The company also entered the cereal market with Kellogg's, creating Ulker Kellogg's in 2005. The partnership ended in 2018.

In 2009, Yıldız combined operations with Danish gum technologist Gumlink.

=== 2010s ===
Yıldız saw further growth in 2012, when it formed a partnership with SCA, a paper and personal care company, and acquired retail chain ŞOK Supermarkets. In 2013, Yıldız acquired meat processor Aytaç.

In 2014 Yıldız Holding purchased DeMet's Candy Company in the United States and United Biscuits in the UK.

In 2016 the company brought together its core biscuit and confectionery businesses Godiva Chocolatier, United Biscuits, Ulker and DeMet's Candy Company, to form a new global company, “pladis”.

In 2018, in the course of the Turkish currency and debt crisis, 2018, Yildiz Holding unexpectedly requested its creditors to restructure as much as US$7 billion in loans.

In 2019, Yıldız Holding sold Godiva's operation in Japan, South Korea, Australia, New Zealand, and its manufacturing facility in Belgium to MBK Partners.

== Operations ==
=== Food ===
Yıldız Holding's food production business was its first and remains one of its key sectors. The company's brands include Ülker, which operates globally and is part of pladis, a group that includes GODIVA, McVitie's, and DeMet's. As of 2017, pladis was the second-largest biscuit company and seventh-largest chocolate company in the world. Yıldız Holding also offers other food products, such as edible oil, frozen food, and charcuterie. Adapazarı Şeker, one of Turkey's oldest sugar factories, and DFU, a leading Turkish frozen bakery company, also operate under Yıldız Holding.

==== Pladis ====
Pladis is a global biscuit and confectionery company which was established in January 2016 when Yıldız Holding brought together United Biscuits, Ülker, Godiva Chocolatier, and DeMet's Candy Company.

=== Retail ===
Retail operations consist of four separate brands.

==== Bizim Toptan ====
The largest Cash & Carry chain in Turkey, with over 170 stores in more than 70 provinces.

==== g2mEKSPER ====
It focuses on the out-of-home consumption sector, offering sales, supply, distribution, and logistics services for food and non-food products needed by professional kitchens and businesses.

==== Seç ====
Convenience stores was established to support small-scale tradespeople, and its markets operate throughout Turkey.

==== Şok ====
Discount supermarkets one of Turkey's largest retail chains, with over 9,500 stores and 40,000 employees.

=== Yıldız Tech ===
Yıldız Tech supports the digital applications of the holding, especially in software development.

=== Private Equity Investment ===
Gözde Girişim Sermayesi Yatırım Ortaklığı is Yıldız Holding's private equity company and is listed on the Borsa Istanbul Stock Exchange under the ticker symbol GOZDE.Gözde Tech Ventures was established by Gözde Girişim Sermayesi Yatırım Ortaklığı, to invest in technology start-ups and drive the development of innovative business ideas. Yıldız Holding has invested in several companies, including Makina Takım, Azmüsebat, Polinas, and Penta Teknoloji, creating added value for these companies.
