= Oatmeal Creme Pie =

Oatmeal cookie sandwich

Oatmeal creme pie
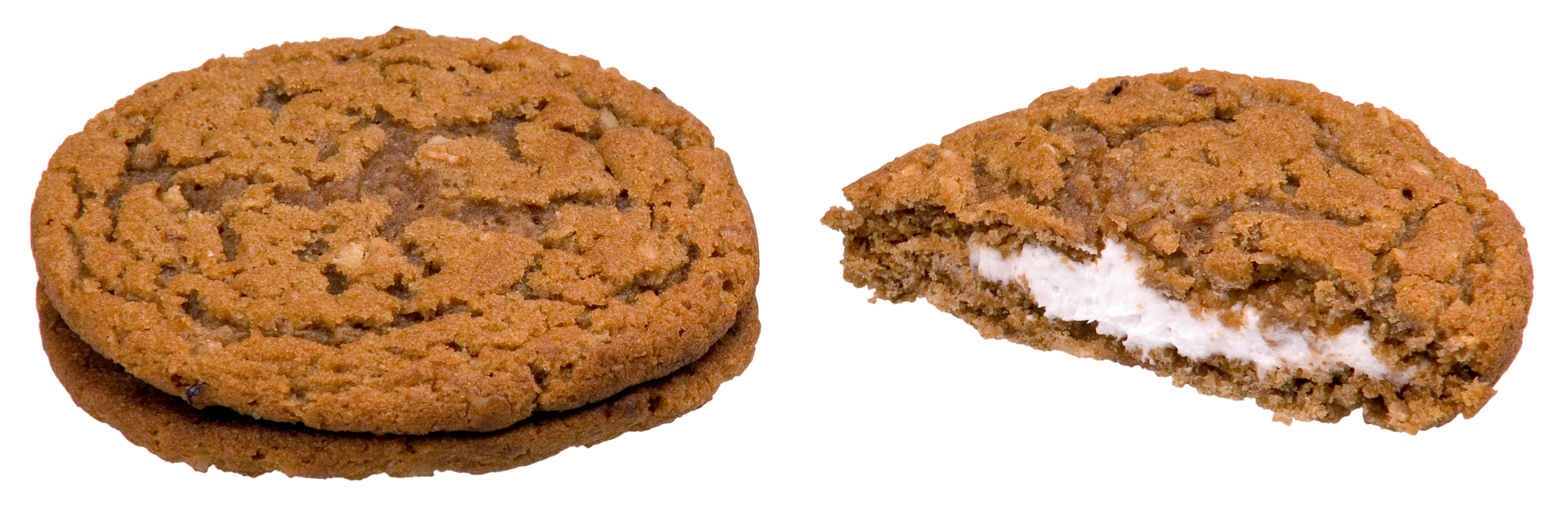
- Oatmeal Creme Pies, shown whole and split.
- Type: Sandwich cookie
- Place of origin: Chattanooga, Tennessee
- Created by: McKee Foods
- Invented: 1935
- Main ingredients: Oatmeal cookies, creme filling
- Food energy (per 75g serving): 330 kcal (1,400 kJ)

Oatmeal creme pies were the first Little Debbie snack cake commercially produced by McKee Foods. The snack consists of two soft oatmeal cookies stuffed with fluffy creme filling.

Along with other Little Debbie snacks, oatmeal creme pies are sold in the United States, Canada, Mexico, and Puerto Rico. In December 2020, Kellogg's released a Little Debbie Oatmeal Creme Pies cereal.

== History ==
The oatmeal creme pie was created by Oather "O.D." McKee in 1935 during the middle of the Great Depression. At the time, McKee was working at Jack's Cookies, a local bakery in Chattanooga, Tennessee that made oatmeal, raisin, and vanilla cookies which sold for one cent each. McKee and his wife, Ruth, had recently purchased the bakery and were looking for ways to expand business. McKee had an idea to boost sales by offering a new product, an oatmeal sandwich cookie, which he sold for a nickel. The new oatmeal sandwich cookie modified the original oatmeal cookie recipe by using a soft cookie instead of a hard cookie. To complete the sandwich, McKee added a fluffy creme filling between the two soft oatmeal cookies. In 1960, McKee founded the Little Debbie brand and began commercially selling oatmeal creme pies in family-pack cartons for 49 cents. Over 14 million oatmeal creme pies were sold in the first 10 months of the snack cake's release.

== In popular culture ==
Oatmeal creme pies have been mentioned in songs by artists such as Jay-Z, Southern Culture on the Skids, Waka Flocka Flame, and Lil Debbie. It also known to be a favored snack of retired college football coach Nick Saban.

== See also ==
- Fudge Rounds
- Nutty Buddy
