= Swiss roll =

A sweet roulade

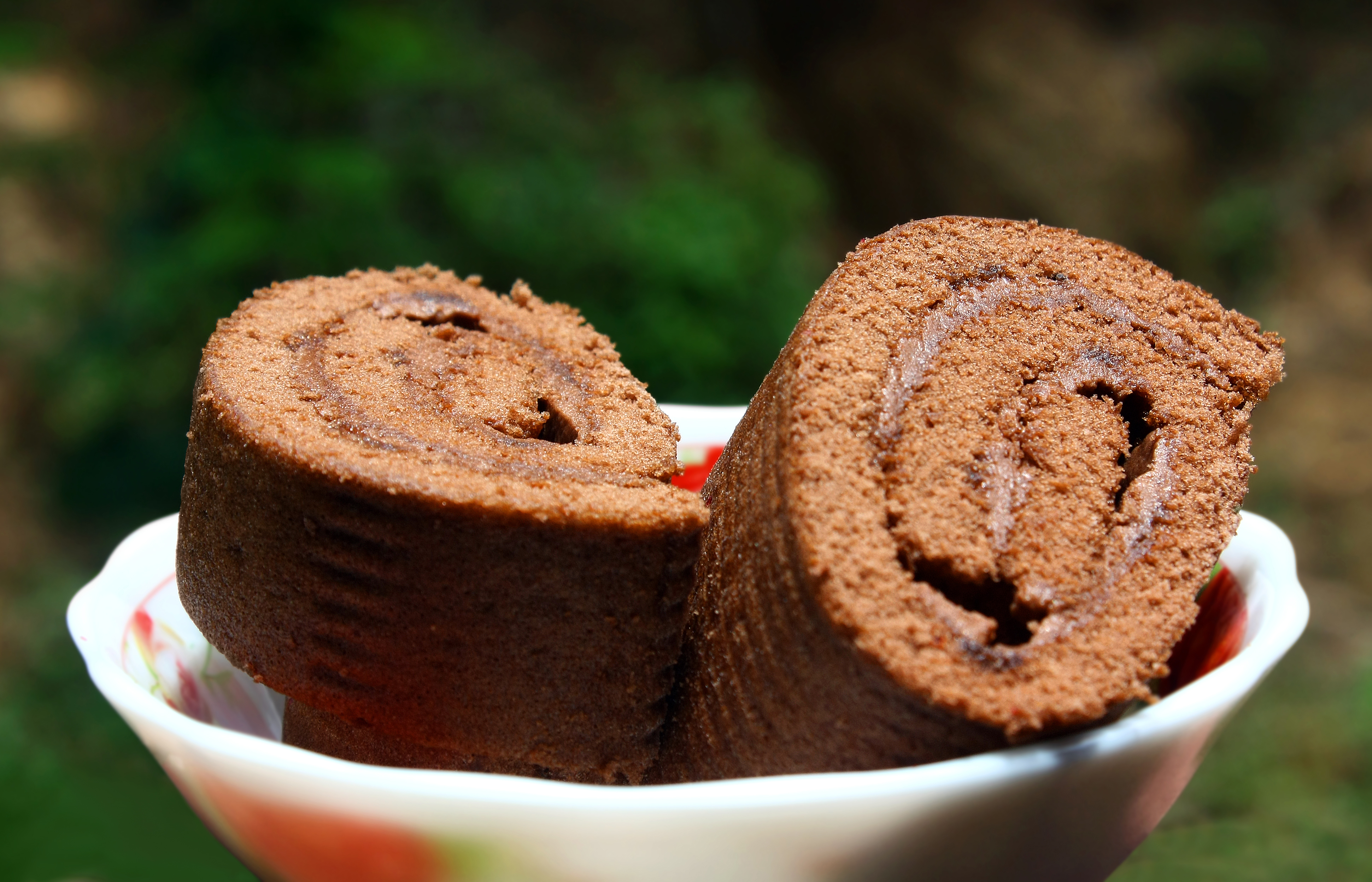
- A Sri Lankan Swiss roll
- Alternative names: Jelly roll, roll cake, roulade, gâteau roulé, swiss cake, mini rolls, jam roll, sponge roll
- Type: Sponge cake
- Place of origin: Central Europe (likely)
- Main ingredients: Flour, eggs, sugar, jam or buttercream or whipped cream

A Swiss roll, jelly roll (United States), roll cake (West Asia), cream roll (South Asia), roulade (France, Switzerland and Denmark), rullekake (Norway), rulltårta (Sweden), kääretorttu (Finland), gâteau roulé (France), swiss cake, mini rolls, jam roll or sponge roll (Australia), is a type of rolled sweet roulade. Sponge cake is filled with either whipped cream, fruit preserves, icing, or any type of sweet filling and then rolled. The origins of the term is unclear; in spite of the name "Swiss roll", the cake is believed to have originated elsewhere in Central Europe, possibly Austria It appears to have been invented in the nineteenth century, as were Battenberg cake, doughnuts, and Victoria sponge. A type of roll cake called Yule log is traditionally served at Christmas.

The spiral shape of the Swiss roll has inspired usage as a descriptive term in other fields, such as the jelly roll fold, a protein fold, the "Swiss roll" metamaterial in optics, and the term jelly roll in science, quilting and other fields.

== History ==
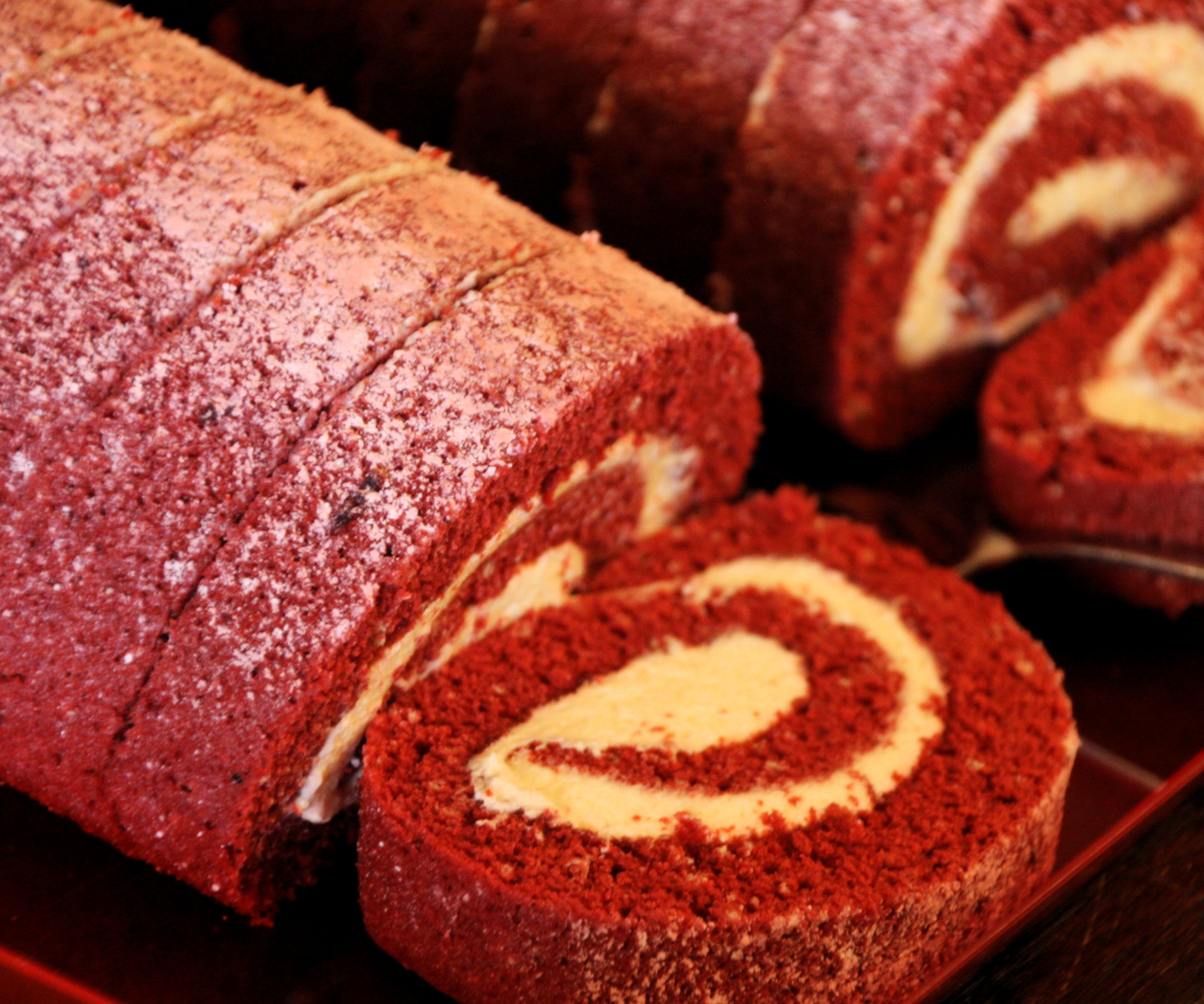
A homemade red velvet Swiss roll with buttercream filling

The earliest published reference for a rolled cake spread with fruit preserves was possibly in the Northern Farmer, a journal published in Utica, New York, in December 1852. Called "To Make Jelly Cake", the recipe describes a modern "jelly roll" and reads: "Bake quick and while hot spread with jelly. Roll carefully, and wrap it in a cloth. When cold cut in slices for the table."

The terminology evolved in America for many years. From 1852 to 1877, such a dessert was called jelly cake (1852), roll jelly cake (1860), Swiss roll (1872), jelly roll (1873), and rolled jelly cake (1876). The name "jelly roll" was eventually adopted in the US.

Roll Sandwich or Swiss Pudding appears in the second edition of The complete biscuit and gingerbread baker's assistant in 1854.

The origin of the term "Swiss roll" is unknown. The earliest British reference to a baked item by that name appeared in the Birmingham Journal for Saturday 10 May 1856, page 8, in an advert for Thomas Richards of 71 New Street, Birmingham, where he had "... the patronage bestowed on him for the last fourteen years as the maker of the celebrated Pork Pies, Swiss Rolls, French Pies, German & Genoa Cakes, Grantham and other Ginger Bread for which he defies competition ..."

A rolled cake appeared on a bill of fare dated 18 June 1871, published in the 1872 book A Voyage from Southampton to Cape Town, in the Union Company's Mail Steamer "Syria" (London). A recipe for "Swiss roll" also appeared in the US that same year in The American Home Cook Book, published in Detroit, Michigan, in 1872.

Several 1880s to 1890s cookbooks from London, England, used the name Swiss roll exclusively.

The American Pastry Cook, published in Chicago in 1894, presented a basic "Jelly Roll Mixture" then listed variants made from it that included a Swiss roll, Venice roll, Paris roll, chocolate roll, jelly roll cotelettes, and decorated jelly rolls.

== International variations ==
=== France ===
The Bûche de Noël is a traditional Christmas cake of French origin. It is a rolled cake, usually chocolate cake, filled with chocolate whipped cream and decorated with icing sugar to resemble a snow-covered tree log. There are many variations of this cake, including some that are not cakes but are made of sorbet, ice cream, or elaborate creations, offering a multitude of flavor combinations.

=== Germany ===
In Germany, it is called Biskuitrolle, which means "sponge cake roll". It can also be named after its filling (e.g. Zitronenrolle – lemon roll, Erdbeerrolle – strawberry roll)

=== Hong Kong ===
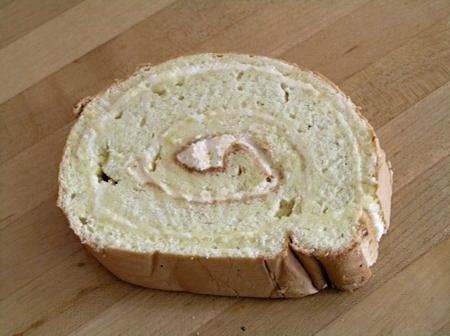
The Hong Kong Swiss roll looks identical to its Western counterpart, but is much lighter in taste.

This type of cake was probably introduced in the late 19th or early 20th century, when Hong Kong was an integral British territory, and it has been sold in Hong Kong well before the existence of Western-style Asian bakeries such as Maxim. Popular variations include

- Swiss roll (Chinese: 瑞士卷 or 瑞士卷蛋糕) with a whipped cream filling,
- Chocolate Swiss roll (Chinese: 朱古力瑞士卷), and
- Others such as strawberry, coffee or orange fillings.

=== Overseas Chinatowns ===
Most US Chinatown bakeries sell the basic Hong Kong Swiss roll version. It essentially looks and tastes identical to the one sold in Hong Kong. A popular type of Swiss roll in Chinese bakeries in the US is the tiger roll (Chinese: 虎皮蛋糕卷), which has a golden, striped outer appearance derived from its outermost layer (egg yolk). It has traditional white cream inside, and is similar in appearance to tiger bread.

=== India ===
In India, Swiss rolls are called "jam rolls". They are sold across regional bakeries along with cream rolls and other local delicacies.

=== Indonesia ===
In Indonesia, the Swiss roll cake is called bolu gulung. Most bakeries sell Swiss rolls daily, and they are filled with butter cream, cheese or fruit jam. It is also common for Swiss rolls to be sold by the slice, but some shops sell by both slice and roll.

=== Italy ===
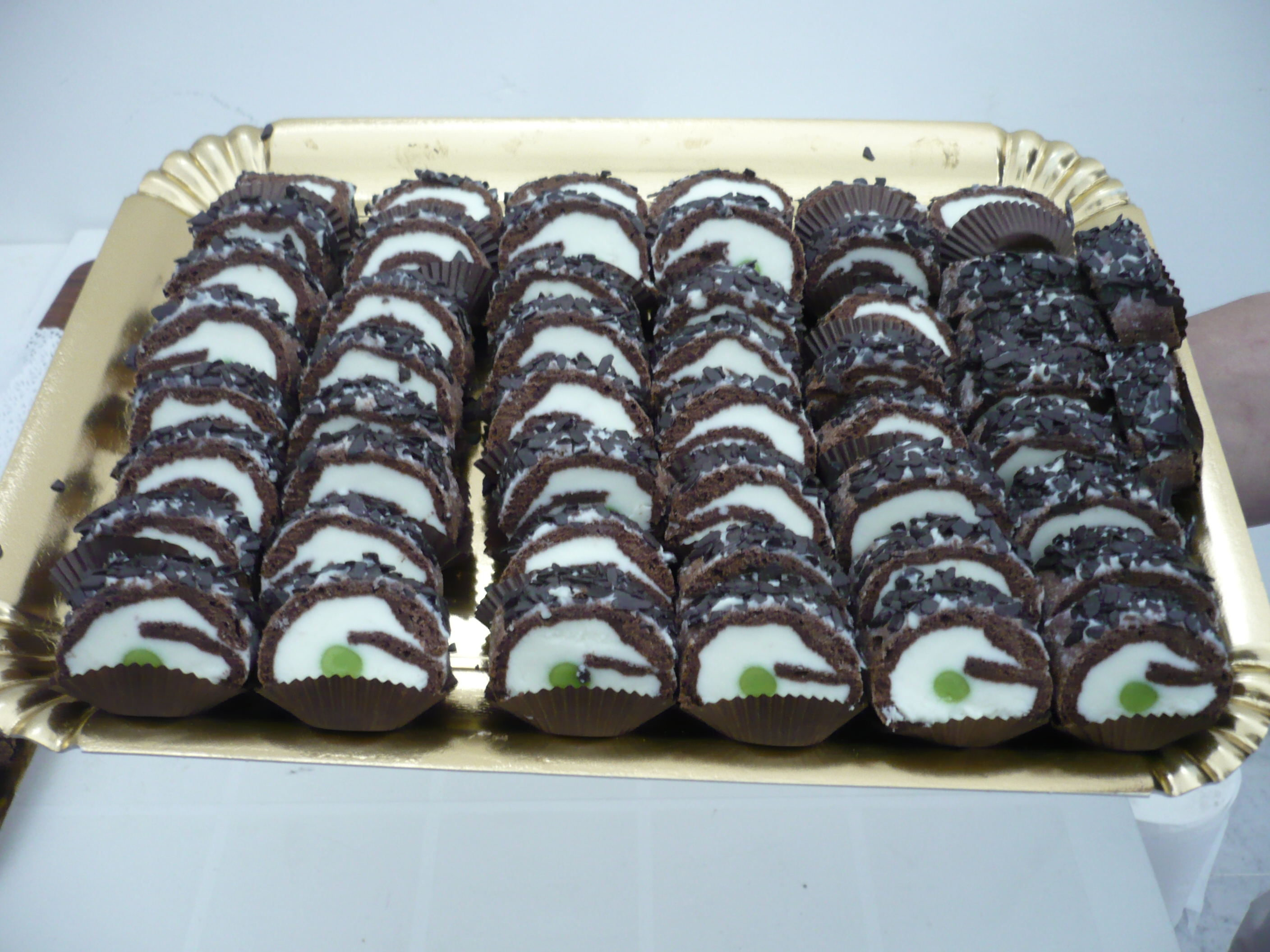
Italian rollò nisseno

In Sicily around Caltanissetta (Italy), there is a cake made with chocolate sponge, ricotta, and marzipan called the rollò (from French roulé).

=== Japan ===
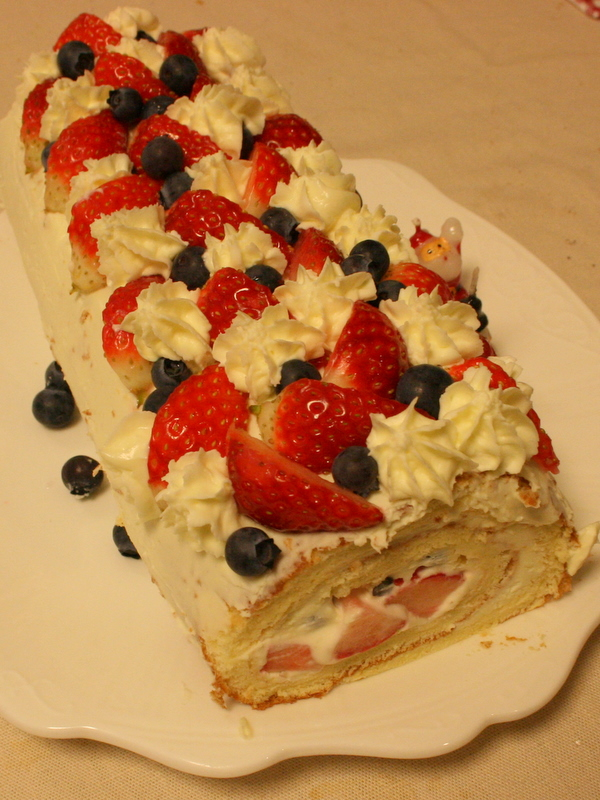
Japanese roll cake with whipped cream, strawberries and blueberries

In Japan, Swiss rolls are called "roll cake". They are filled with whipped cream and sometimes with fruits like strawberries.

=== Latin America ===
In Colombia, a Swiss roll is called either pionono or brazo de reina ("queen's arm"), and it is filled with dulce de guayaba (guava jam) or arequipe. In Argentina, Uruguay and Peru, it is also called pionono, and it is filled with dulce de leche or manjar blanco (which are a more caramelized and thicker version of condensed milk). In Chile it is called brazo de reina, filled with dulce de leche only, and sprinkled with powdered sugar. It is called arrollado in Costa Rica.

In Puerto Rico and Venezuela it is known as brazo de gitano, but there is a vast array of fillings that include cream, chocolate truffle, dulce de guayaba, dulce de leche manjar blanco, often combined with fruits. In Brazil, it is called rocambole. In Mexico it is called niño envuelto ("wrapped child"). In Ecuador, Guatemala and Uruguay it is known as a brazo gitano ("gypsy's arm").

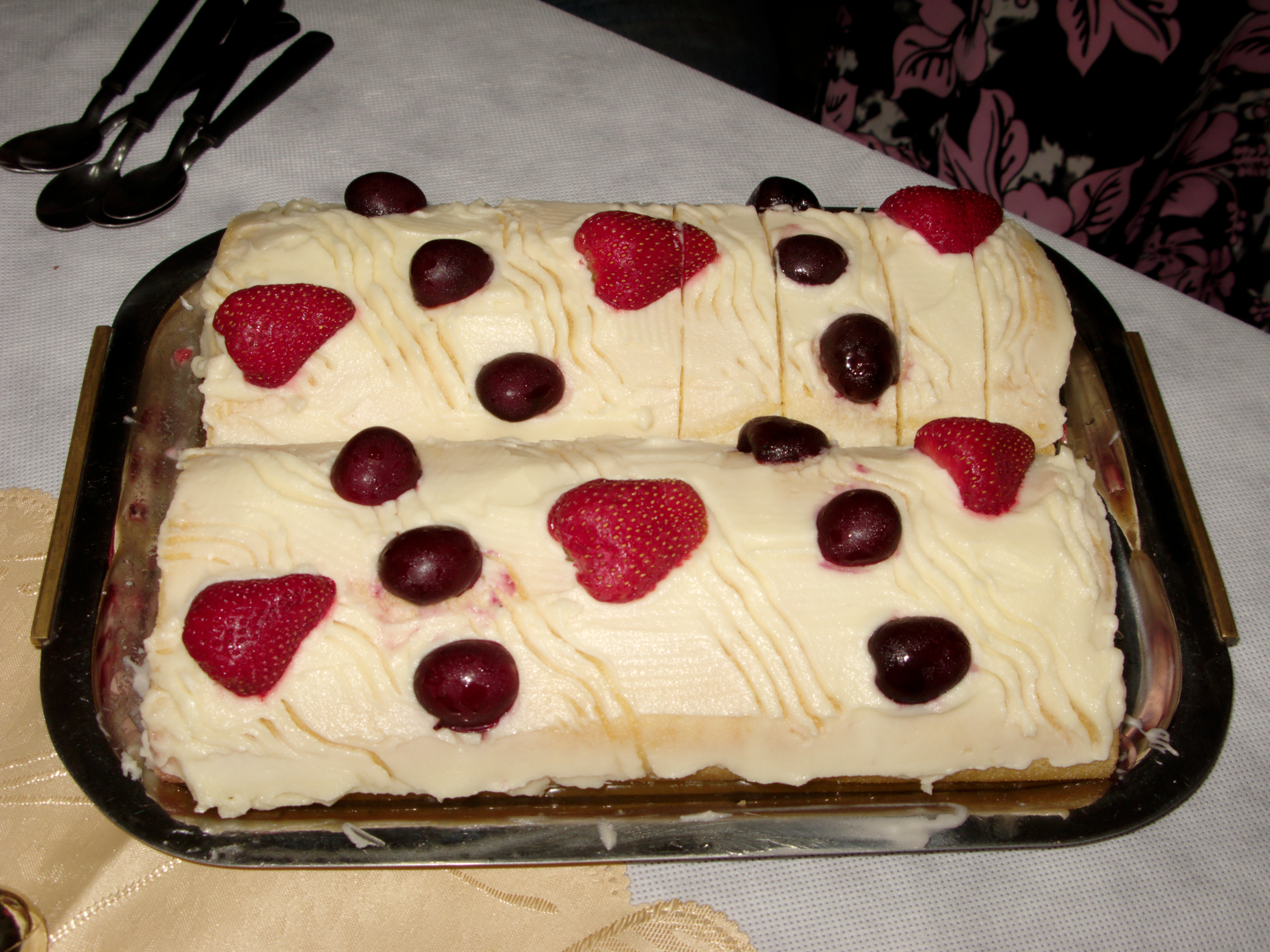
Argentine piononos

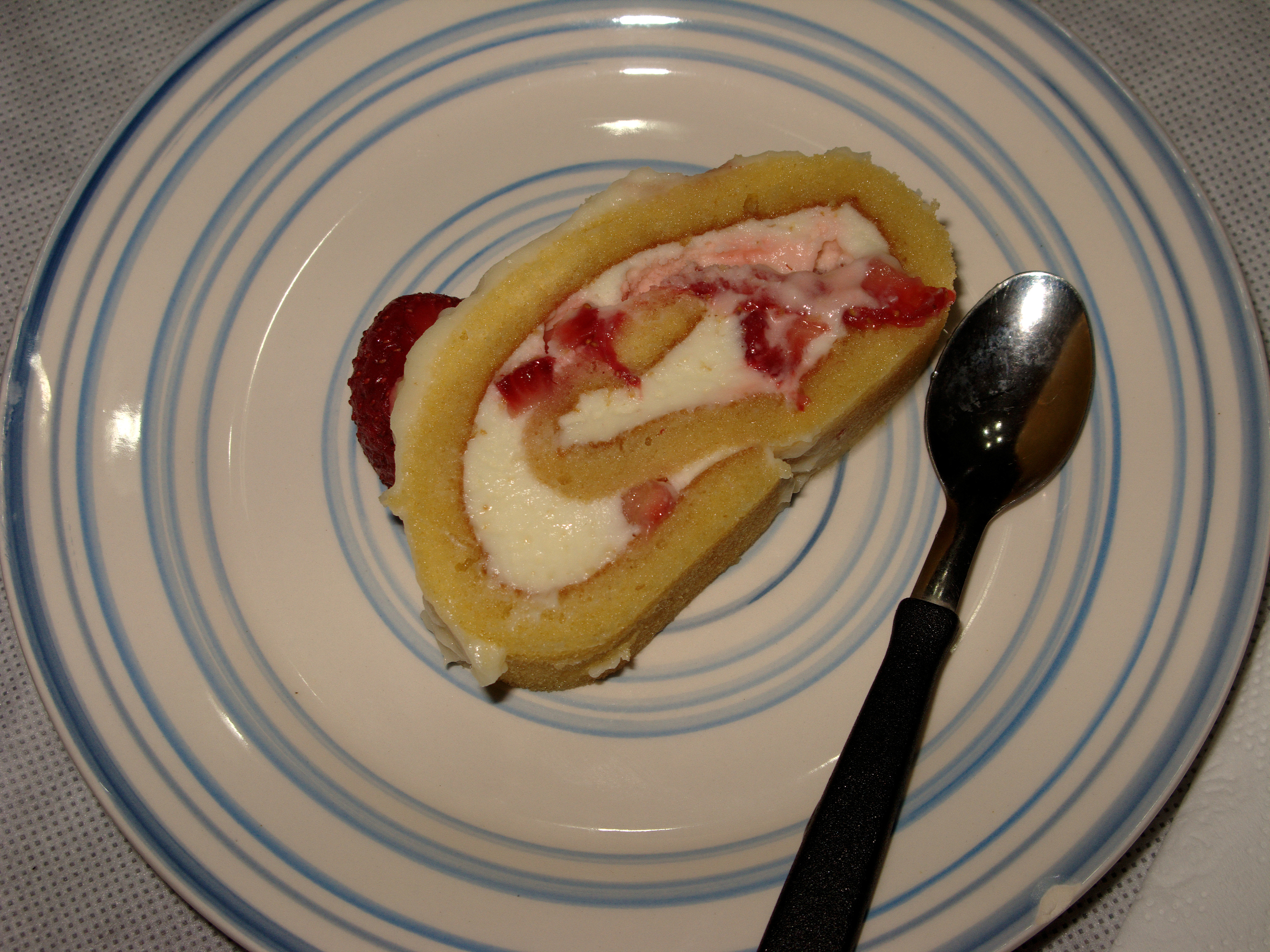
Sliced Argentine pionono

=== Southeast Asia ===
Varieties produced in Southeast Asia include kaya, pandan, blueberry, strawberry, sweet potato, taro, vanilla, orange, chocolate, raspberry, and even local fruits like durian, cempedak, and mango.

=== Philippines ===
In the Philippines, the most similar traditional pastry is the pionono which is part of the regular offerings of neighborhood bakeries since the Spanish colonial period. It is a rolled variant of the traditional Filipino sponge cakes (mamón) and similarly originally has a very simple filling of sugar and butter (or margarine). Modern versions, however, are commonly frosted and can include a variety of fillings. A very popular variant is the pianono version of the ube cake generally known as "ube rolls". It is flavored with ube (purple yam) and macapuno, giving it a characteristic vivid purple color. Mango pianono or "mango roll", a variant of the mango cake, are also popular and are made with ripe Carabao mangoes and cream. Another notable traditional pianono is the brazo de Mercedes ("arm of Our Lady of Mercy"), composed of a soft meringue body and a custard core. Due to American influence, pianonos are more commonly called "cake rolls" in modern times.

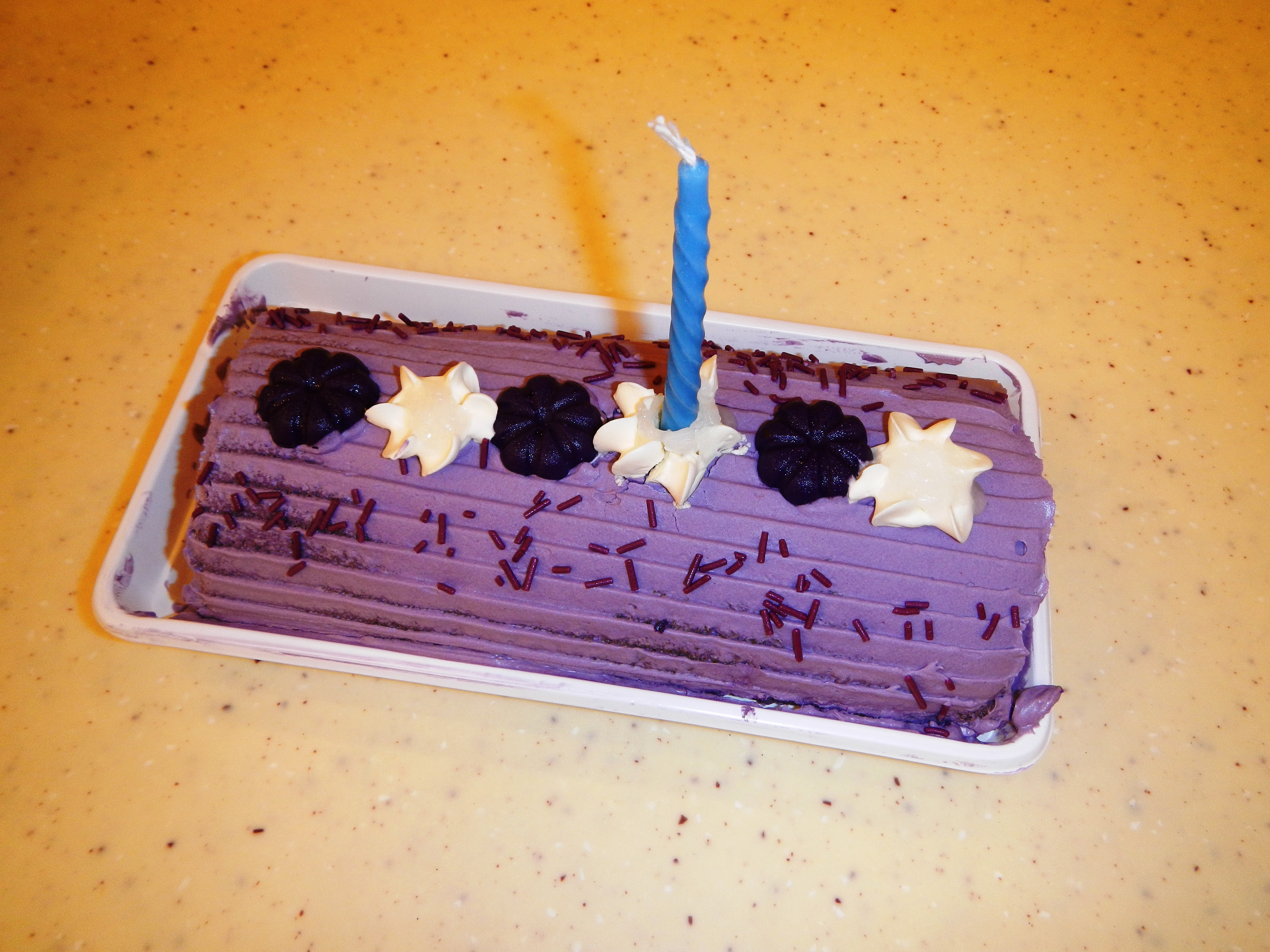
Filipino ube macapuno pionono

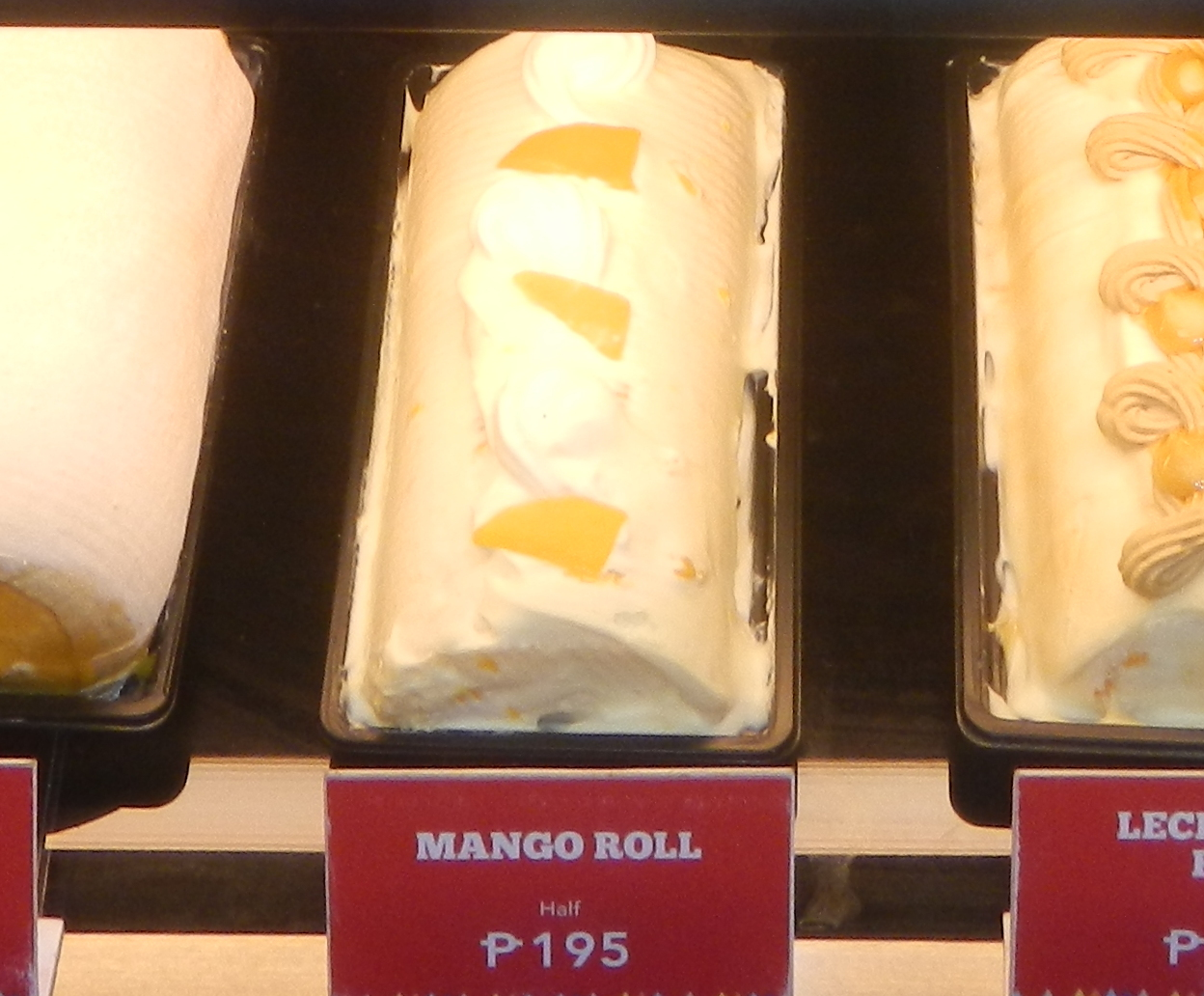
Filipino mango rolls

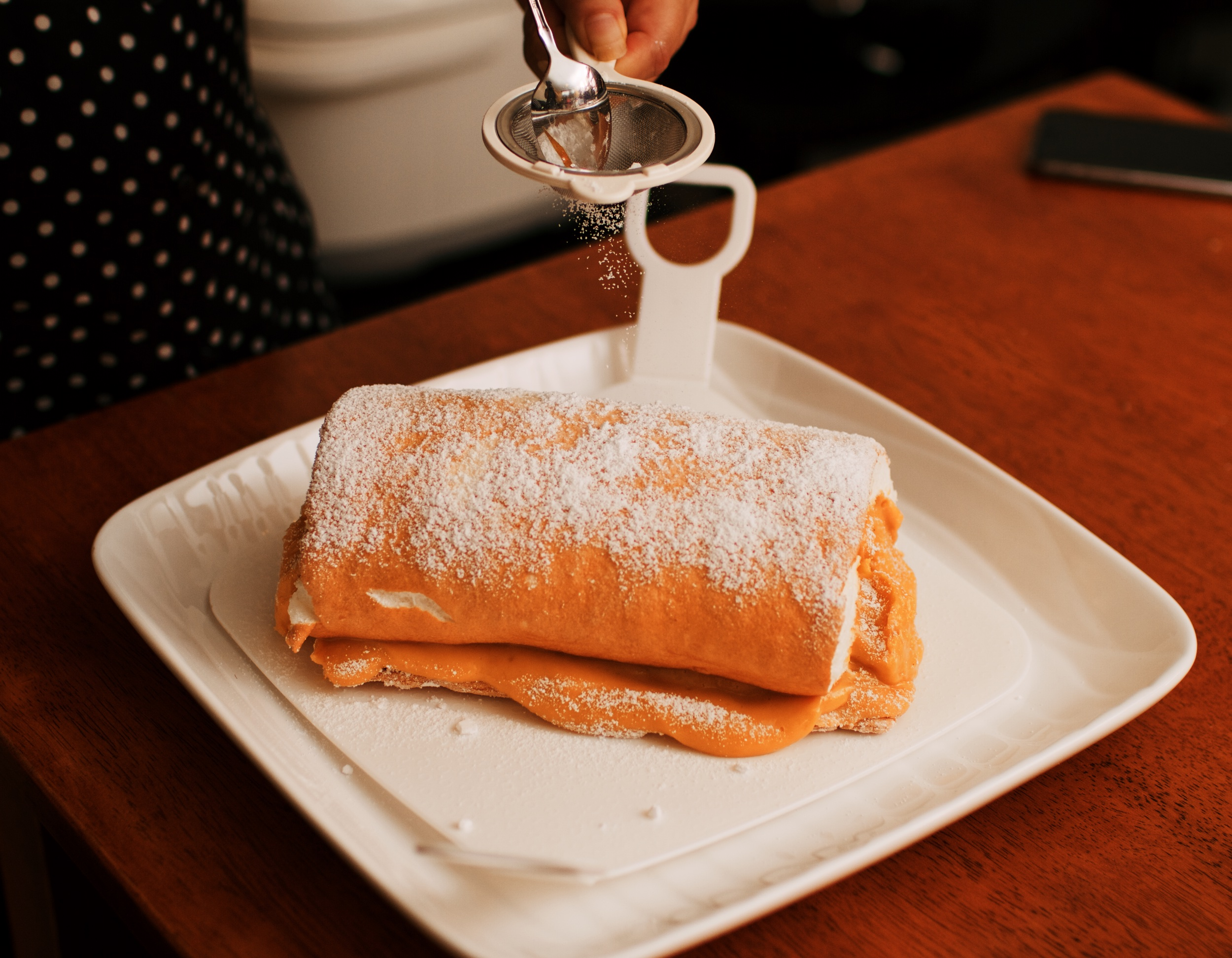
Filipino brazo de Mercedes, a meringue roll

=== Portugal ===
In Portugal, desserts called tortas are commonly found on restaurant menus. Such desserts are not tarts, nor are they similar to German torte. They are simply Swiss rolls with jam filling.

=== Nordic countries ===
In Denmark and Norway, Swiss rolls are called roulade and rullade, respectively. An alternative Norwegian name is rullekake or, in some parts of the country, swissrull.

In Sweden and Finland, Swiss rolls are called rulltårta and kääretorttu, respectively (both meaning "roll-cake"), and are commonly served with coffee. The filling often consists of butter cream and strawberry jam. The base of a chocolate version, called drömrulltårta ("dream roll-cake"), is made mostly of potato flour, instead of the typical wheat flour, and is filled with butter cream. More elaborate versions of the Swiss roll can be found in bakeries, with, for example, whipped cream and a crushed banana rolled in the middle, or with a thin marzipan coating that resembles a birch log.

=== Spain ===
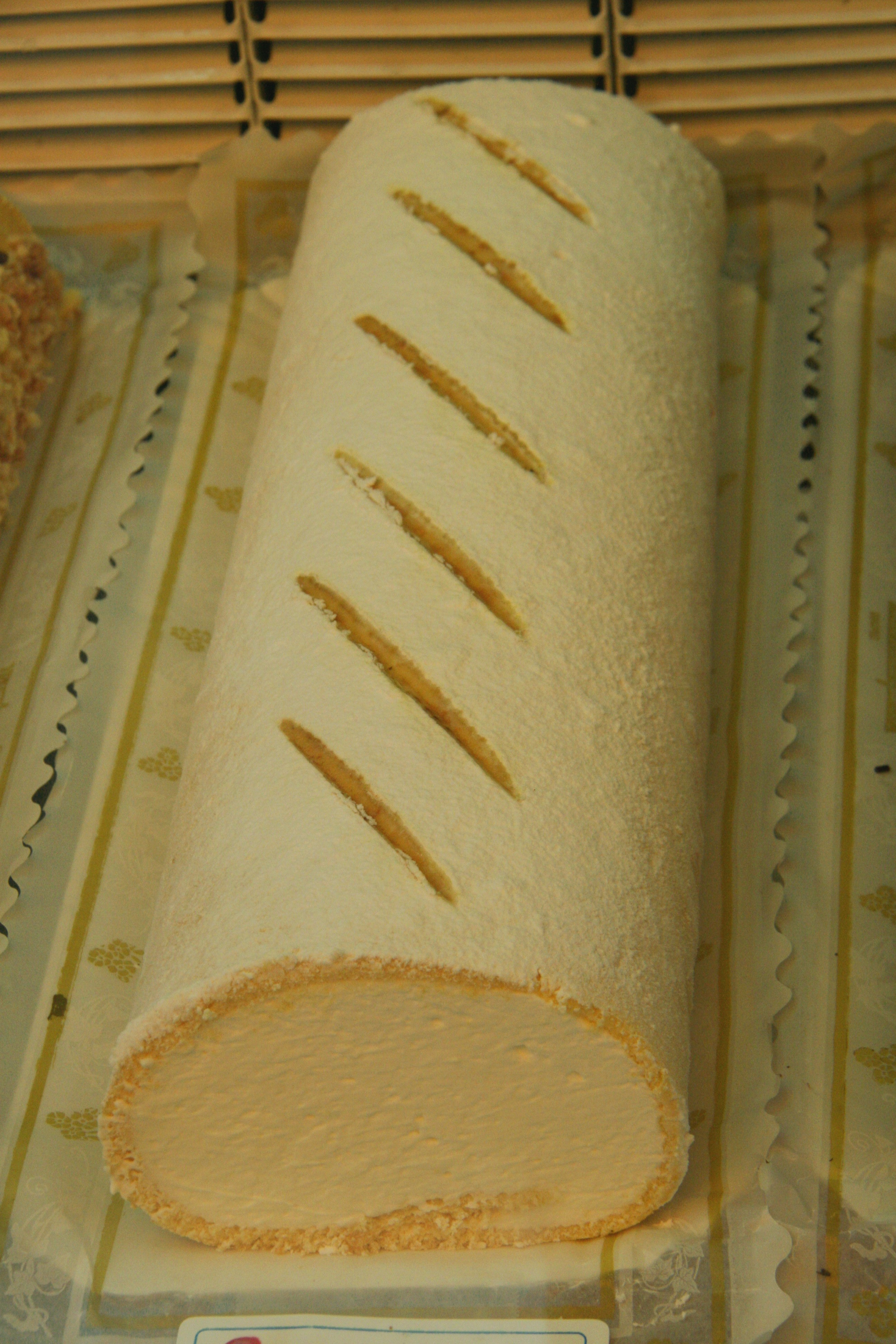
Brazo de gitano

In Spain, the dessert is called brazo de gitano (literally translated as "gypsy's arm") and is commonly filled with cream, jam (such as peach or apricot), powdered cocoa and nuts.

=== Switzerland ===
Despite its name, the Swiss roll appears not to have originated in Switzerland. Swiss rolls are called Biskuitroulade or Roulade in Swiss Standard German, gâteau roulé or roulade in French, rotolo or biscotto arrotolato in Italian and rullada in Romansch.

=== United Kingdom ===
In the UK, Swiss rolls are popular at teatime or as a dessert. A variety of Swiss rolls are sold in supermarkets in the United Kingdom, such as chocolate, lemon, or jam. Jam Swiss rolls will be filled typically with seedless strawberry, raspberry, or apricot jam and sometimes cream, with a sugar outer coating. Jam roly-poly is a similar dessert, but made as a suet pudding rather than a sponge cake, filled with jam and served hot with custard.

Smaller individual rolls with vanilla or chocolate sponge, filled with raspberry jam and cream, or chocolate and cream, and the whole encased in milk chocolate, such as those made by Cadbury's. Seasonal variations include those made specifically with Halloween in mind.

"Caterpillar cakes" are Swiss rolls decorated to look like caterpillars, one popular commercial example being Marks and Spencer's Colin the Caterpillar.

=== United States ===
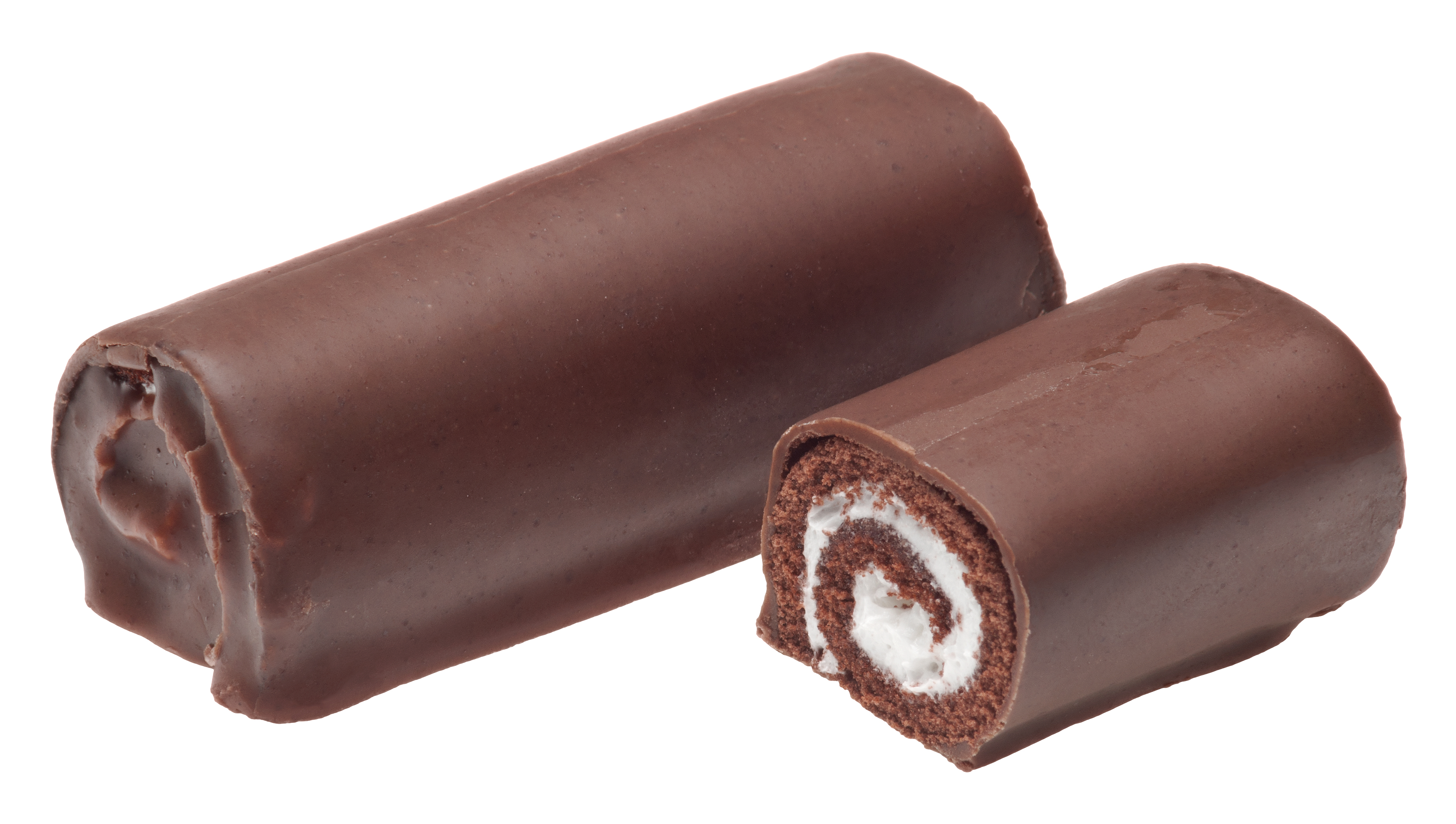
Swiss Cake Rolls made by Little Debbie (also called Mini roll)

American pastry chefs and menus in fine dining restaurants often use the French term roulade. The chocolate Swiss roll, sometimes referred as "chocolate log", is a popular cake or dessert. Produced by many commercial bakeries, common brands include Ho Hos and Yodels, which are smaller rolls for individual consumption. When the filling is ice cream, it is commonly referred to as an "ice cream cake roll", and although they can vary, these often consist of chocolate cake with vanilla ice cream.

== See also ==
- Cinnamon roll
- Jam roly-poly
- List of cakes
- List of desserts
