= Ho Hos =

American snack cake brand

Ho Hos are small, semi cylindrical, frosted, cream-filled chocolate snack cakes with a pinwheel design based on the Swiss roll. Made by Hostess Brands, they are similar to Yodels by Drake's and Swiss Cake Rolls by Little Debbie.

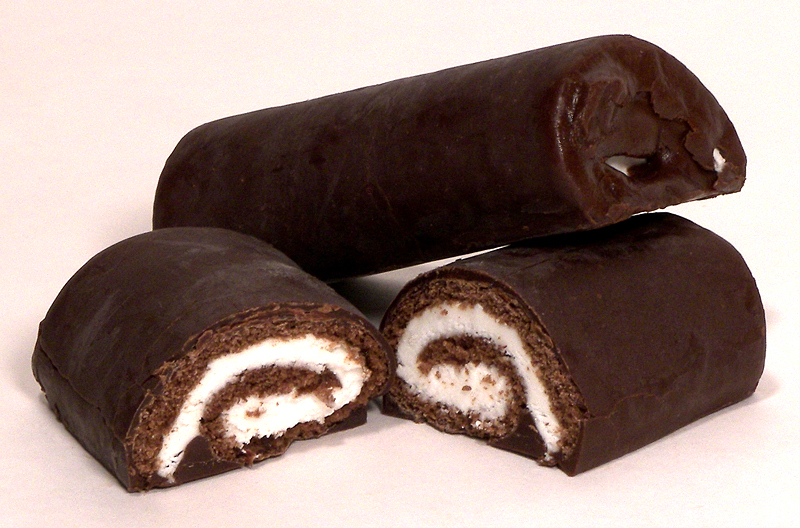
Ho Hos

Sold two or three per package, they contain about 120 calories per roll.

The product is also produced in Canada by Vachon Inc., which holds its Canadian rights, but they are marketed as Chocolate Swiss Rolls.

== History ==
A San Francisco bakery created the first Ho Hos in 1967.

Happy Ho Ho was created in the 1970s and was the original cartoon mascot for Ho Hos. The mascot appeared on the boxes, ads, and television commercials for many years before he was discontinued. The character wore an outfit similar to that of Robin Hood, including a feathered cap.

== Additional varieties ==
A nut-covered version named Nutty Ho Hos was introduced in 1989, along with a promotional search for "the country's nuttiest celebrity laugh" which was awarded to comedian Eddie Murphy based on consumer votes.

Caramel Ho Hos were introduced in February 2004. The modified snack includes a layer of caramel along with the creme filling. Caramel-chocolate Ho Hos were another new flavor, introduced in May 2003.

== See also ==
- Yule log (cake)
