= Sandwich cookie =

Cookies kept by two thin cookies or biscuits with filling in between

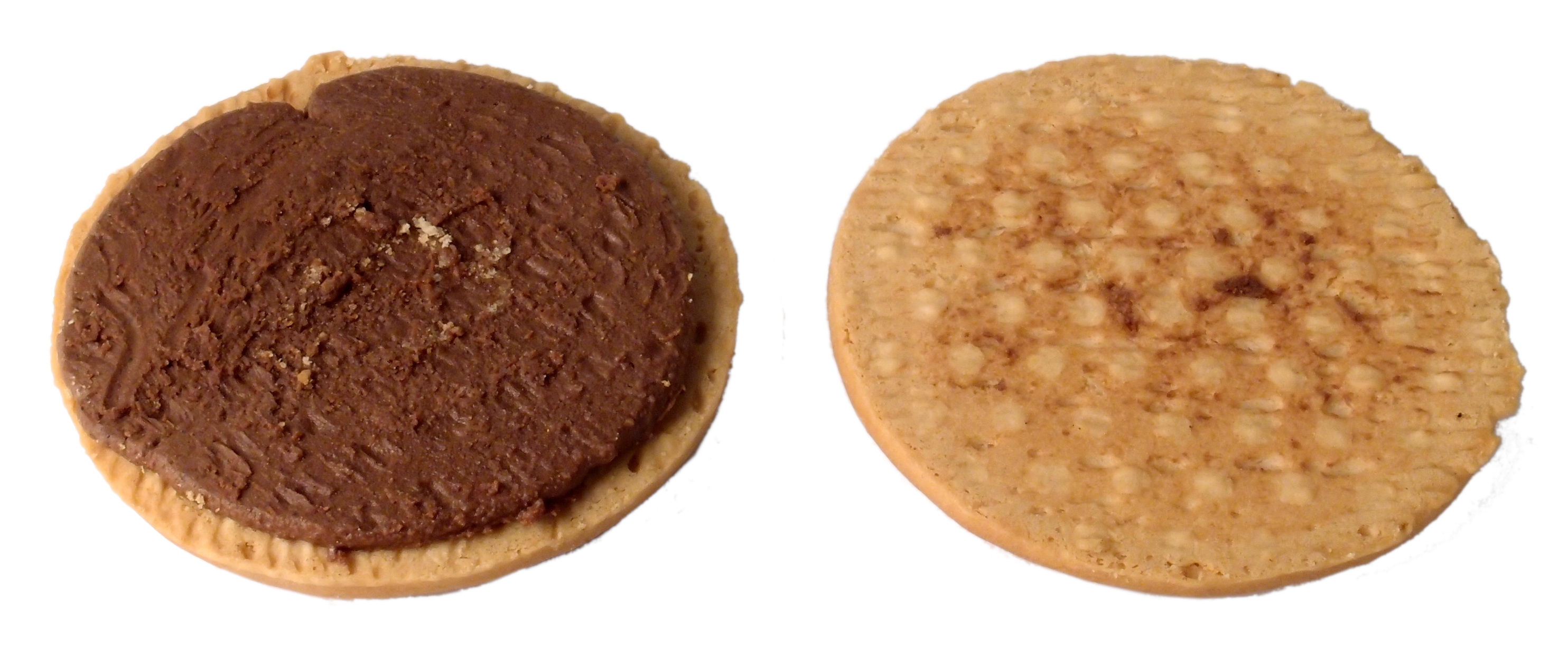
- A split sandwich cookie
- Course: Dessert

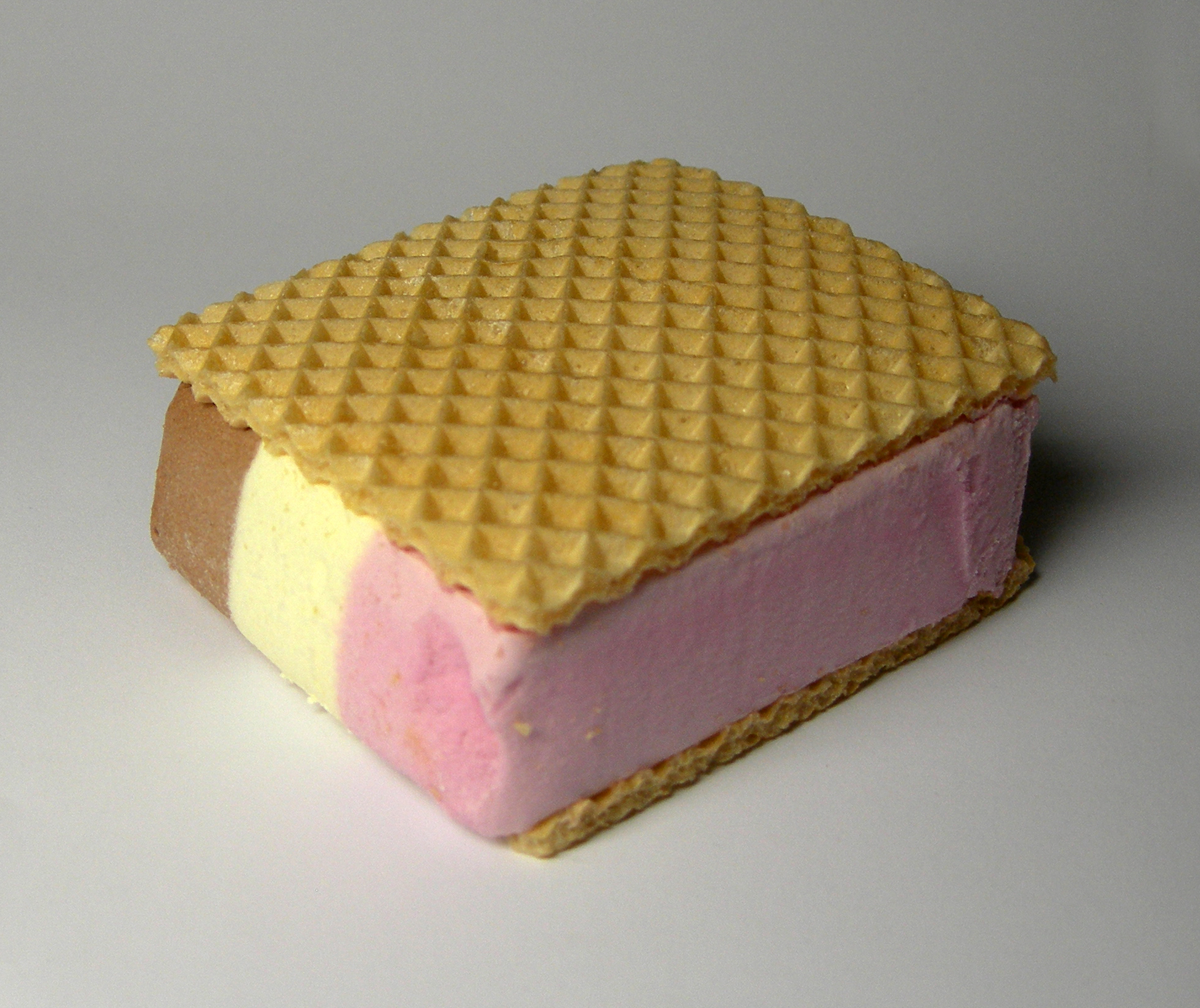
Pückler-Schnitte—a German sandwich cookie with "Neapolitan" ice cream filling

A sandwich cookie (US and Canada), also known as a sandwich biscuit (UK, Ireland, Australia, New Zealand, and South Africa), is a type of sandwich made from two cookies with a filling between them. Typically the hard, thin cookies known as biscuits outside North America are used, though some sandwich cookies use softer or thicker cookies. Many types of fillings are used, such as cream, ganache, buttercream, chocolate, cream cheese, jam, peanut butter, lemon curd, or ice cream.

Though they can be homemade, sandwich cookies are typically mass-produced and sold commercially. The sandwich biscuit market in Europe alone is worth over €1.6 billion a year, with Germany a consistently large consumer. Round sandwich biscuit varieties are more popular throughout Europe than squares, while the square varieties are more popular in Southern Europe than in the rest of the continent.

== Commercially available sandwich cookies ==
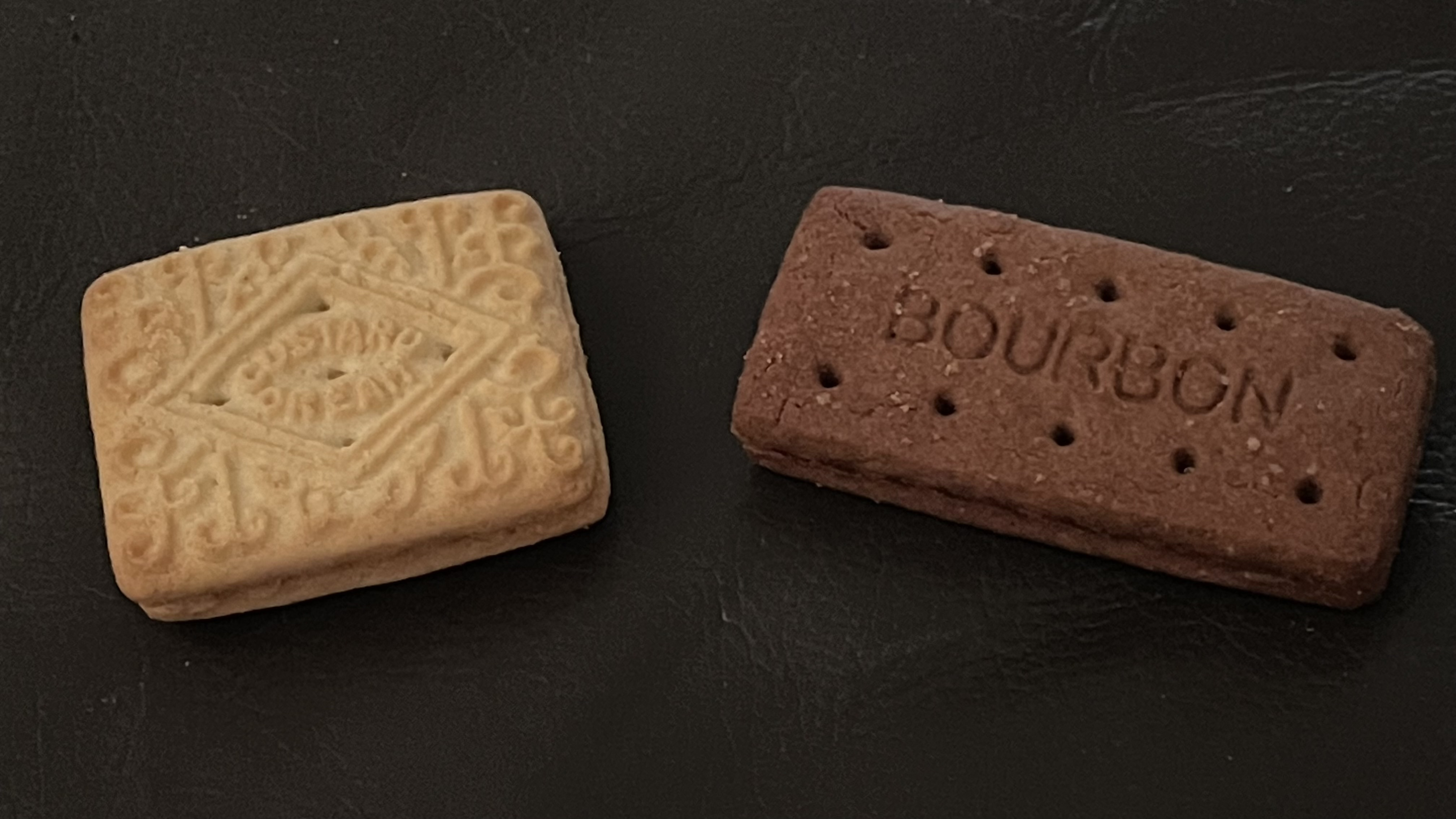
Custard creams and Bourbons are very popular in the British Isles.

=== Brand names ===
- BN (biscuit), a French range of sandwich cookies that feature a face shape cut out of the top cookie
- E.L. Fudge, butter-flavoured shortbread cookies with a fudge creme filling
- Grandma’s Vanilla Mini Sandwich Cremes, bite-size vanilla-flavored sandwich cookies
- Happy Faces, shortcake with a raspberry jam and cream filling and a smiley face cut out of the top
- Hydrox, a creme-filled chocolate sandwich cookie manufactured by Leaf Brands
- Jammie Dodgers, shortbread with a fruit (usually strawberry) flavoured jam filling
- Milano, thin layer of chocolate sandwiched between two biscuit cookies
- Monte Carlo, sweet biscuits sandwiching a creamy filling
- Moon Pie, marshmallow sandwiched between two graham cracker cookies and dipped in a flavoured coating
- Nutter Butter, peanut-shaped cookies with a peanut butter filling
- Nutty Bars, wafers with peanut butter covered in chocolate
- Oatmeal Creme Pie, hand mounded oatmeal cookies with a creme filling
- Oreo, a line of sandwich cookies—most notably a creme-filled chocolate sandwich cookie modelled after Hydrox manufactured by Mondelez International
- Oreo Cakesters, caked version of Oreos consisting of two soft chocolate or vanilla cakes with a fluffy, white cream filling
- Penguin, hard chocolate biscuits sandwiched with chocolate creme, covered in a chocolate-flavoured coating
- Prince de LU, biscuits with chocolate cream
- SnackWell's creme sandwich, an oblong fat-free cookie
- Tim Tam, malted biscuit cookies with a chocolate cream filling and a chocolate coating, similar to Penguin biscuits
- Tru-Blu, creme-filled sandwich cookie manufactured by AbiMar Foods, a subsidiary of Grupo Nutresa
- Wagon Wheels, biscuits with marshmallow and jam filling, covered in chocolate

=== Generic names ===
- Bourbon biscuit, hard chocolate cookie sandwiched with chocolate creme
- Custard cream, creamy, custard-flavoured centre between hard biscuits; the biscuits often feature elaborate relief designs
- Ice cream sandwich, frozen dessert typically composed of ice cream between two biscuits
- Macaron, sweet meringue-based confection
- Maple leaf cream cookie, maple leaf-shaped cookies with maple cream filling
- Wafer, thin biscuit crisps layered between creamy filling; usually sweet but can be savory
- Whoopie pie, round, mound-shaped pieces of cake with a sweet, creamy filling

== See also ==
- Cookie § Classification
- Stroopwafel
- Macaron
- Belvita
- List of cookies
