= Fudge Rounds =

Round snack cake made by Little Debbie

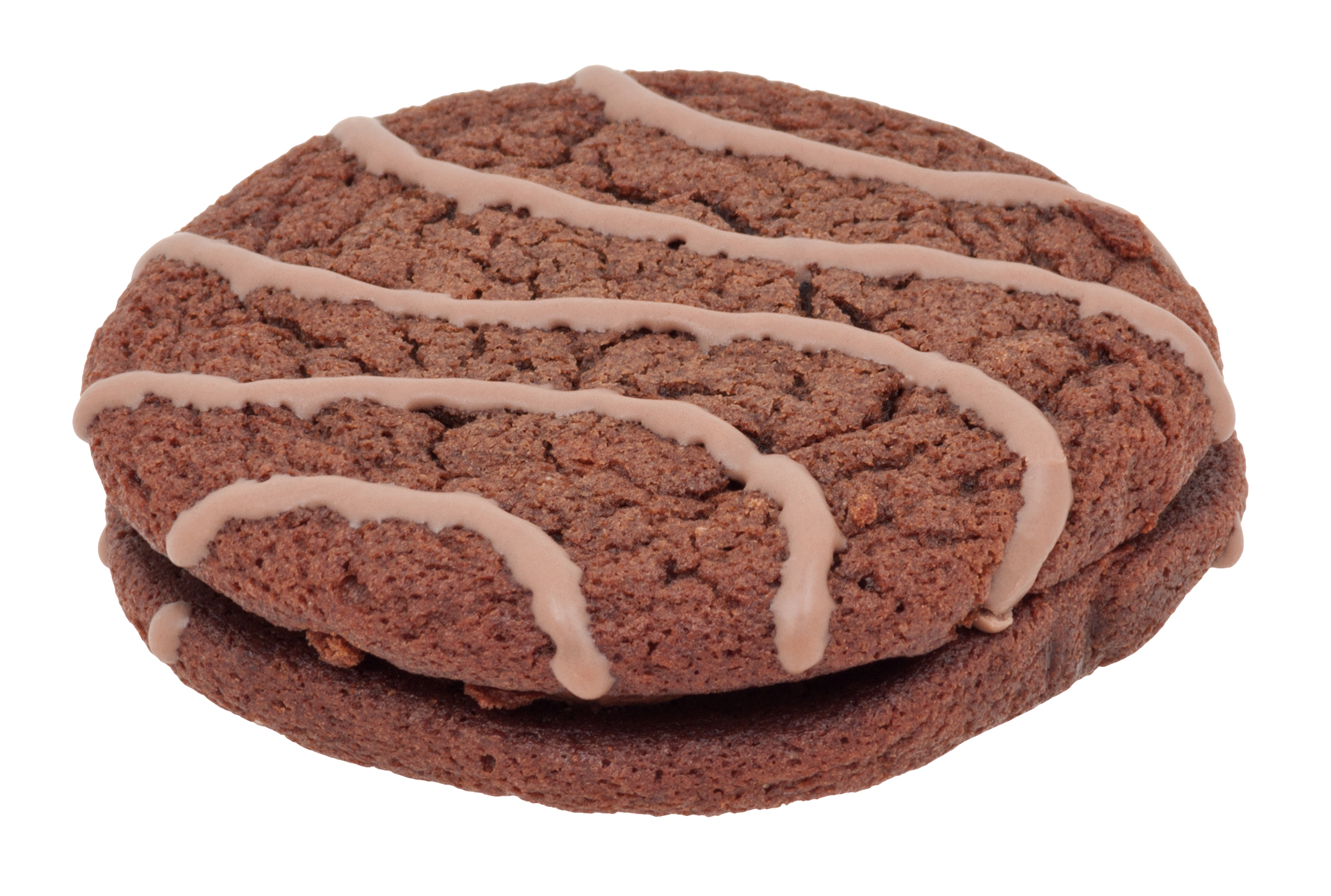

Nutritional value per 1 cookie, 67g
- Energy: 300 kcal (1,300 kJ)
- Carbohydrates: 47 g
- Sugars: 27 g
- Dietary fiber: 2 g
- Fat: 11 g
- Saturated: 5 g
- Monounsaturated: 3 g
- Polyunsaturated: 1.5 g
- Protein: 2 g
Vitamins and minerals
Minerals	Quantity %DV^{†}
Sodium	7% 160 mg
- Other constituents: Quantity
- Cholesterol: 5 mg
- ^{†}Percentages estimated using US recommendations for adults.

Fudge Rounds are fudgy, round snack cakes made by the Little Debbie company. A Fudge Round consists of two chewy chocolate cookies with light brown fudge creme in between, and light brown fudge strips on top.

== In popular culture ==
Fudge Rounds are mentioned in Oliver Anthony's 2023 song "Rich Men North of Richmond."
