= Yule log (cake) =

Traditional Christmas dessert

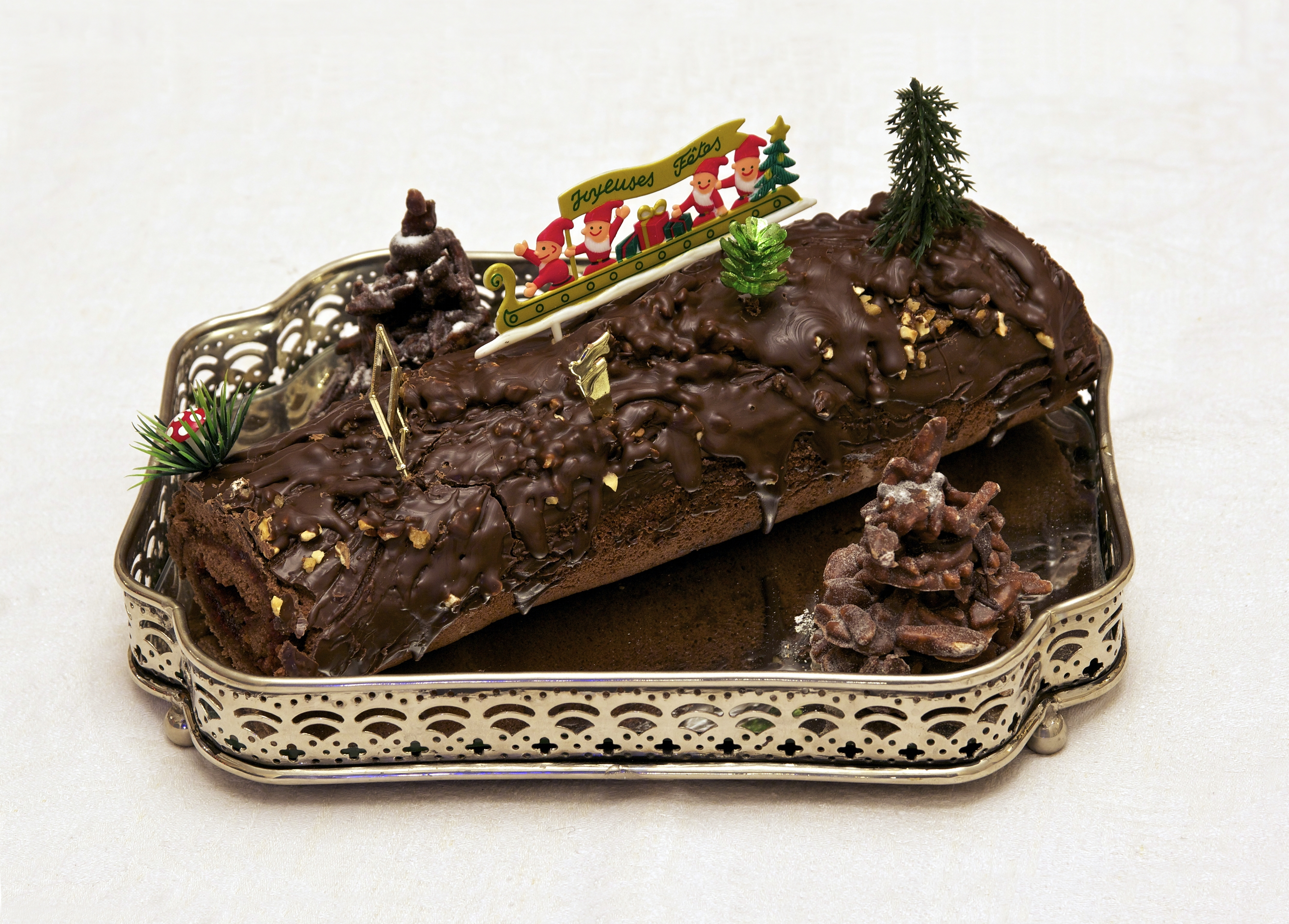
- A traditional Yule log made with chocolate filled with raspberry jam
- Alternative names: Bûche de Noël
- Course: Dessert
- Region or state: Francophone countries, especially France
- Serving temperature: Cold
- Main ingredients: Genoise or other sponge cake, chocolate buttercream, or other icing

A Yule log or bûche de Noël (French pronunciation: [byʃ də nɔɛl]) is a traditional Christmas cake, often served as a dessert, especially in France, Belgium, Luxembourg, Switzerland, Lebanon, Vietnam, and Quebec, Canada. Variants are also served in the United States, United Kingdom, Cambodia, Scandinavia, Portugal, Spain, and Japan.

Made of sponge cake, to resemble a miniature actual Yule log, it is a form of sweet roulade. The cake emerged in the 19th century, probably in France, before spreading to other countries. It is traditionally made from a genoise, generally baked in a large, shallow Swiss roll pan, iced, rolled to form a cylinder, and iced again on the outside. The most common combination is basic yellow sponge cake and chocolate buttercream, though many variations that include chocolate cake, ganache, and icings flavored with espresso or liqueurs exist.

Yule logs are often served with one end cut off and set atop the cake, or protruding from its side to resemble a chopped off branch. A bark-like texture is often produced by dragging a fork through the icing, and powdered sugar sprinkled to resemble snow. Other cake decorations may include actual tree branches, fresh berries, and mushrooms made of meringue or marzipan.

The name bûche de Noël originally referred to the Yule log itself, and was transferred to the dessert after that custom had fallen out of popular use. References to it as bûche de Noël or, in English, Yule Log, can be found from at least the Edwardian era (for example, F. Vine, Saleable Shop Goods (1898 and later).

== The tradition of the Yule log ==
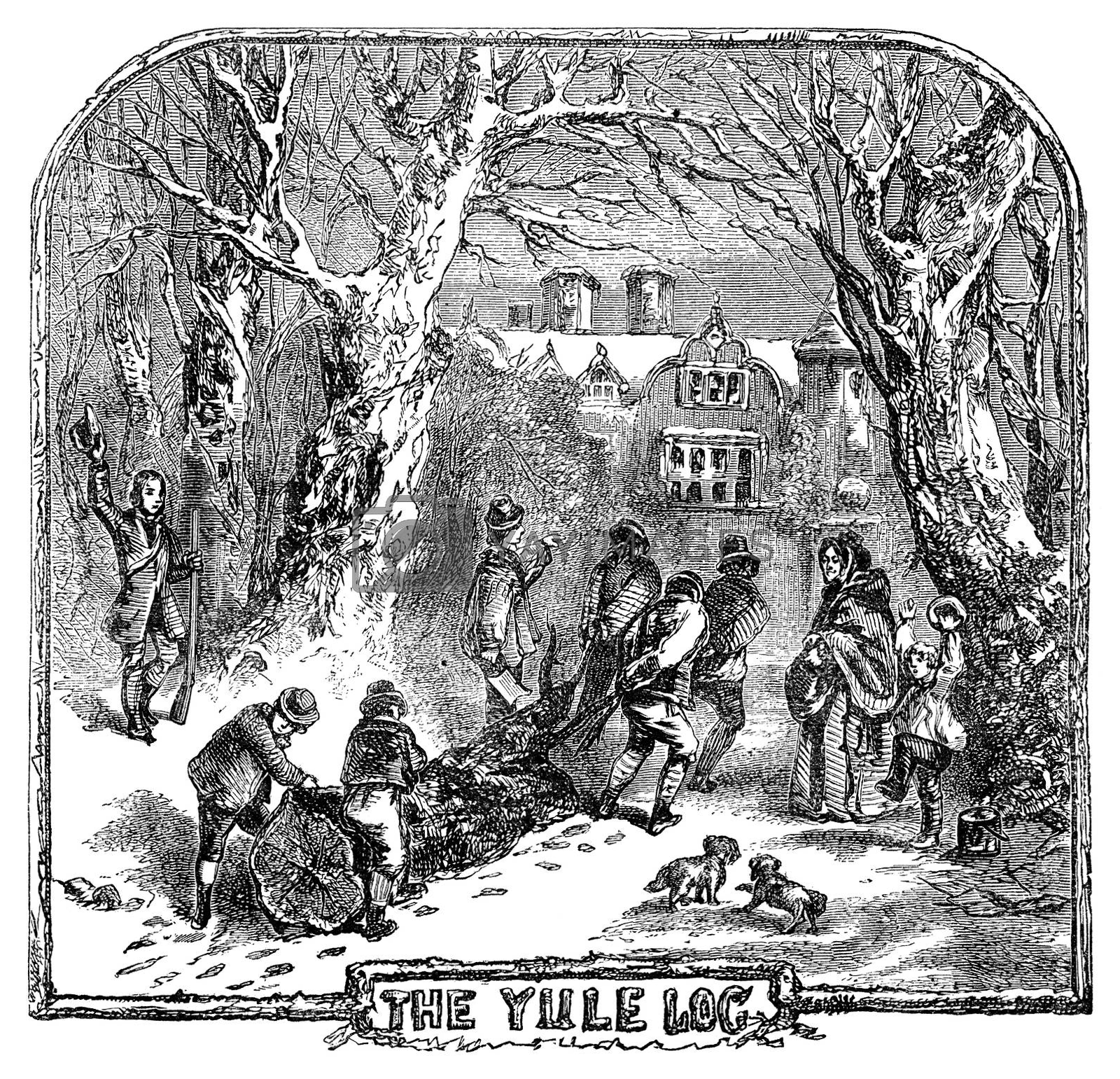
The dragging of the Yule log.

The yule log is a specially selected log burnt on a hearth as a winter tradition in regions of Europe, and subsequently North America. Other than involving a log, the exact tradition varies widely from country to country, and from region to region within countries. Differences can arise on which day the tradition happens on, how the log is to be selected, which type of wood is used, where the ritual takes place, how long the log is burned for, if prayers are said, if offerings are made, if the log is decorated, if something is done with the ashes/charcoal afterwards, or even if the log is burnt at all. In English, the ritual is most commonly referred to as the Yule log, but was originally known as the Christmas log, including in its first mention in England in 1648. Most other languages use names which translate as "Christmas Log", "Christmas block", or "Kalends log", but there are many other variations.

The earliest description of ritual resembling the yule log comes from the 6th century Spanish bishop Martin of Braga in his work De correctione rusticorum.

Latin text

Vulcanalia et Kalendas observare, mensas ornare, et lauros ponere, et pedem observare, et fundere in foco super truncum frugem et vinum, et panem in fontem mittere, quid est aliud nisi cultura diaboli?

Translation

To take notice of the Volcanes and of the Calends, to garnish to tables, to lay laurel, to enter with the right foot, to shed in the fire place, over the burning timber, food and wine, and to throw bread into the fountains, what is this if not Devil worship?

This ritual being described by Martin of Braga, involving putting a log in hearth, and placing food and wine on it, is believed to be the same ritual that we call the Yule log today. The tradition of placing food and wine on the yule log before or during burning is present in descriptions of the practice made in the 20th and 21st centuries in France, Spain, Italy, Croatia, Serbia, Albania, and Montenegro. The food present as part of the offering during this ritual, often sweets, may have morphed into the Yule log cake we have today. Bishop Pirmin, in his book Dicta Abbatis Pirminii, de Singulis Libris Canonicis Scarapsus,written between 710-724 CE, also quotes Martins passage. The scholars Leslie Johnstons and Alexander Tille both suggest that the origin of the yule log comes from a synthesis of Christian practices with the roman holiday of Kalendae Ianuariae in the transitional time between the late antique period and the early Middle Ages. The original ritual is thought to have come from the roman tradition of burning of food, wine, incense, laurels, and wood in the household hearth in honor of the Lares on the kalends of January. This rituals presence in a variety of unrelated cultures throughout Europe could be explained by its spread through the territory of the late roman empire and its successor states. France, Spain, Croatia, and Lithuania also all have regional names for the yule log tradition that mention Kalends. Baltic countries, though not once part of the roman empire, are thought to have yule log traditions today because the ritual was introduced to the region as part of the Christianization efforts of the Northern Crusades. A variety of historians and scholars have sought to link the yule logs origins to the Scandinavian/Germanic holiday of Yule over the centuries, mostly drawing on symbolic similarities, archetypic similarities', and studies of modern-day folklore. Professor Ronald Hutton disagrees with the claim of a Yule origin, pointing to the fact that modern day Scandinavia has no yule log traditions, and that the Icelandic sagas, our best sources for medieval descriptions of yule celebrations, make no references to special logs when taking about fire or feasting during yule. Historically, the yule logs first association with the holiday of Yule comes about in John Aubrey's writings between 1650 and 1687s on Christmas when he writes "a large Yule log or Christmas block".

The first reference of the yule log in connection with Christmas comes from a German manuscript of legal obligations written in 1184 CE, where it records that the manse of Ahlen is entitled to a whole tree for a private festive fire on Christmas eve. Another early reference can be found in the text Liber statutorum civitatis Ragusii compositus anno, which was written in Dubrovnik in 1272 CE. It records that shipmasters and the sailors brought the count of the city a large log on Christmas eve and place it on the fire, for which they are given as reward two gold coins and alcohol.

== Gallery ==
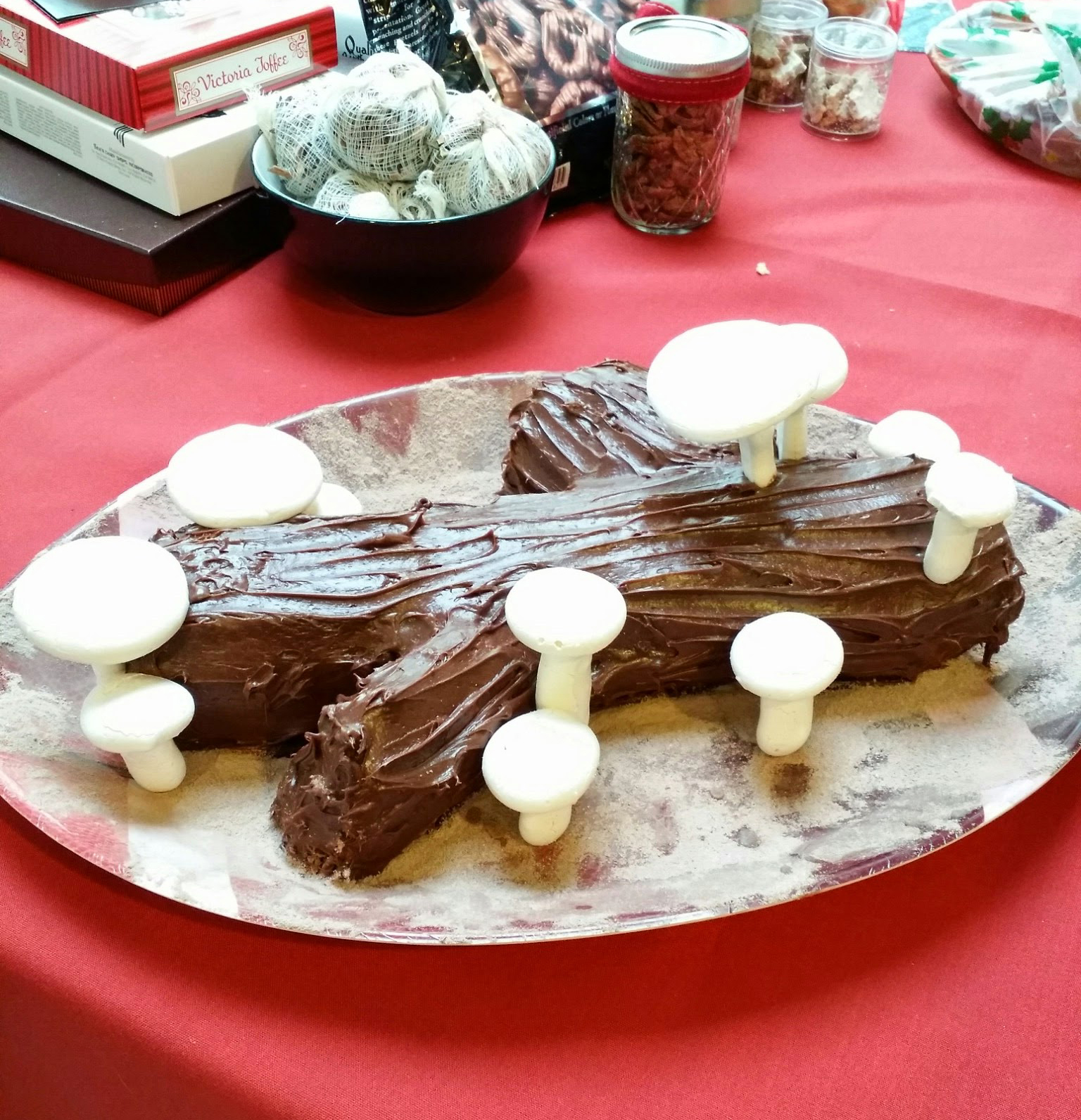

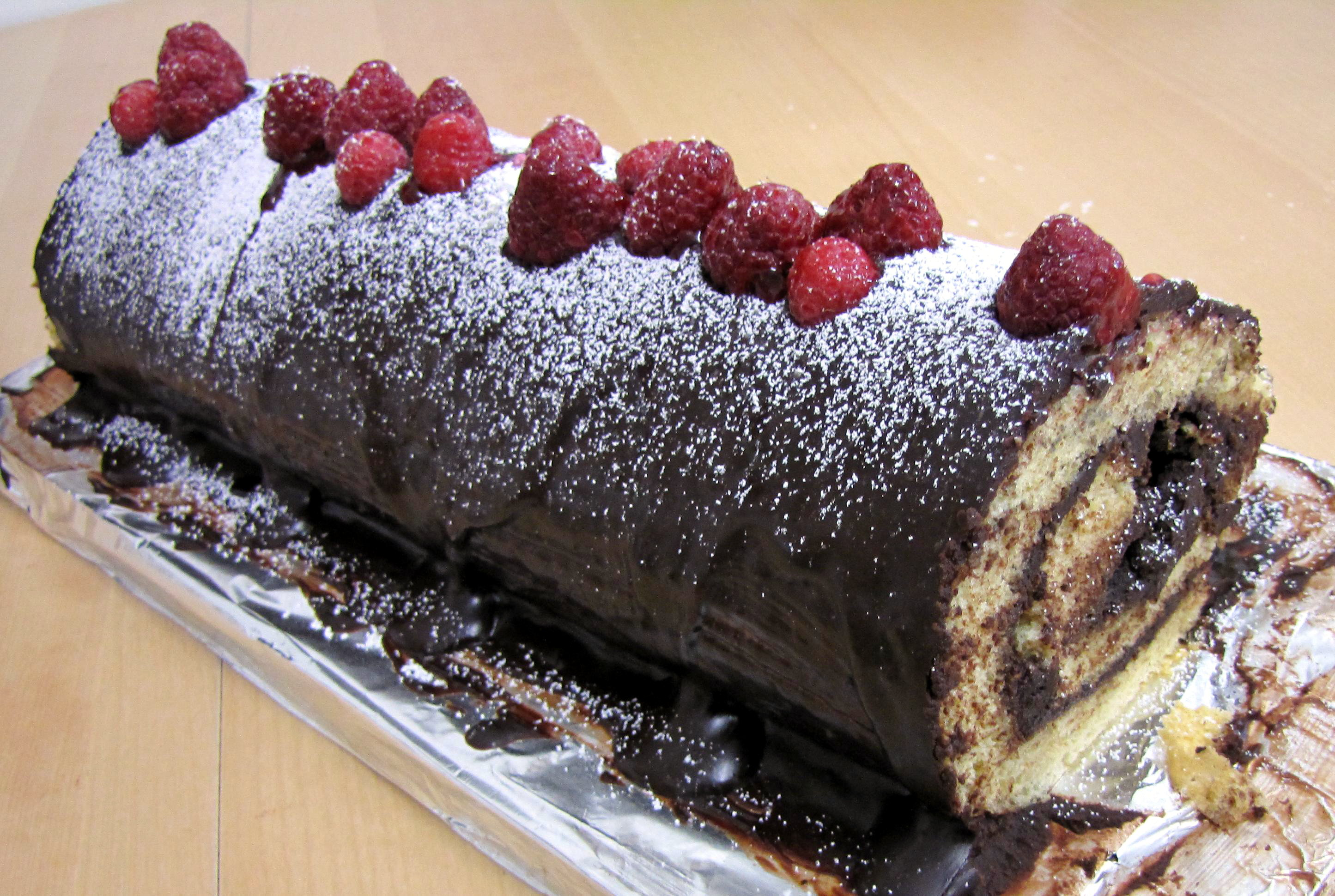

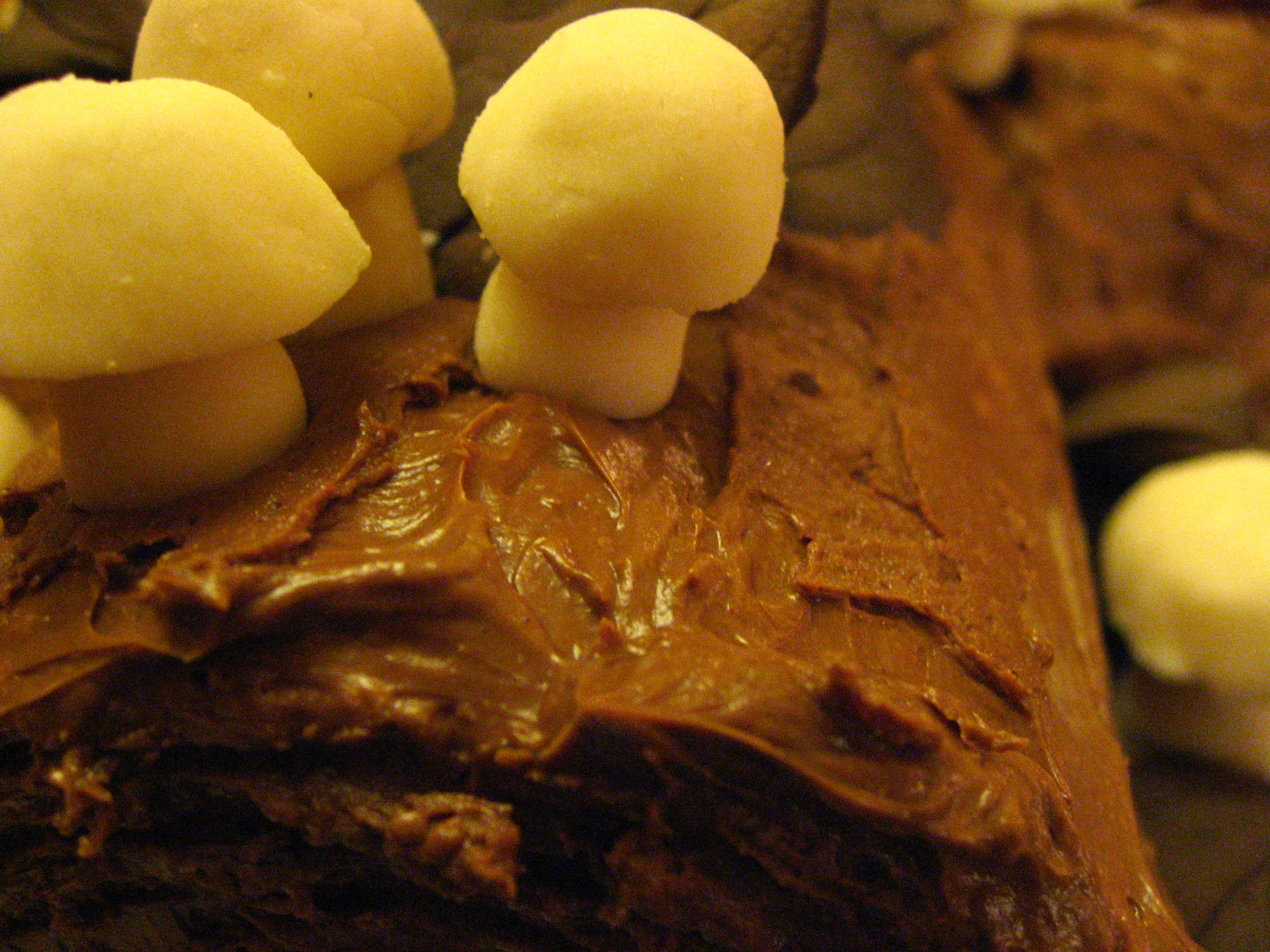

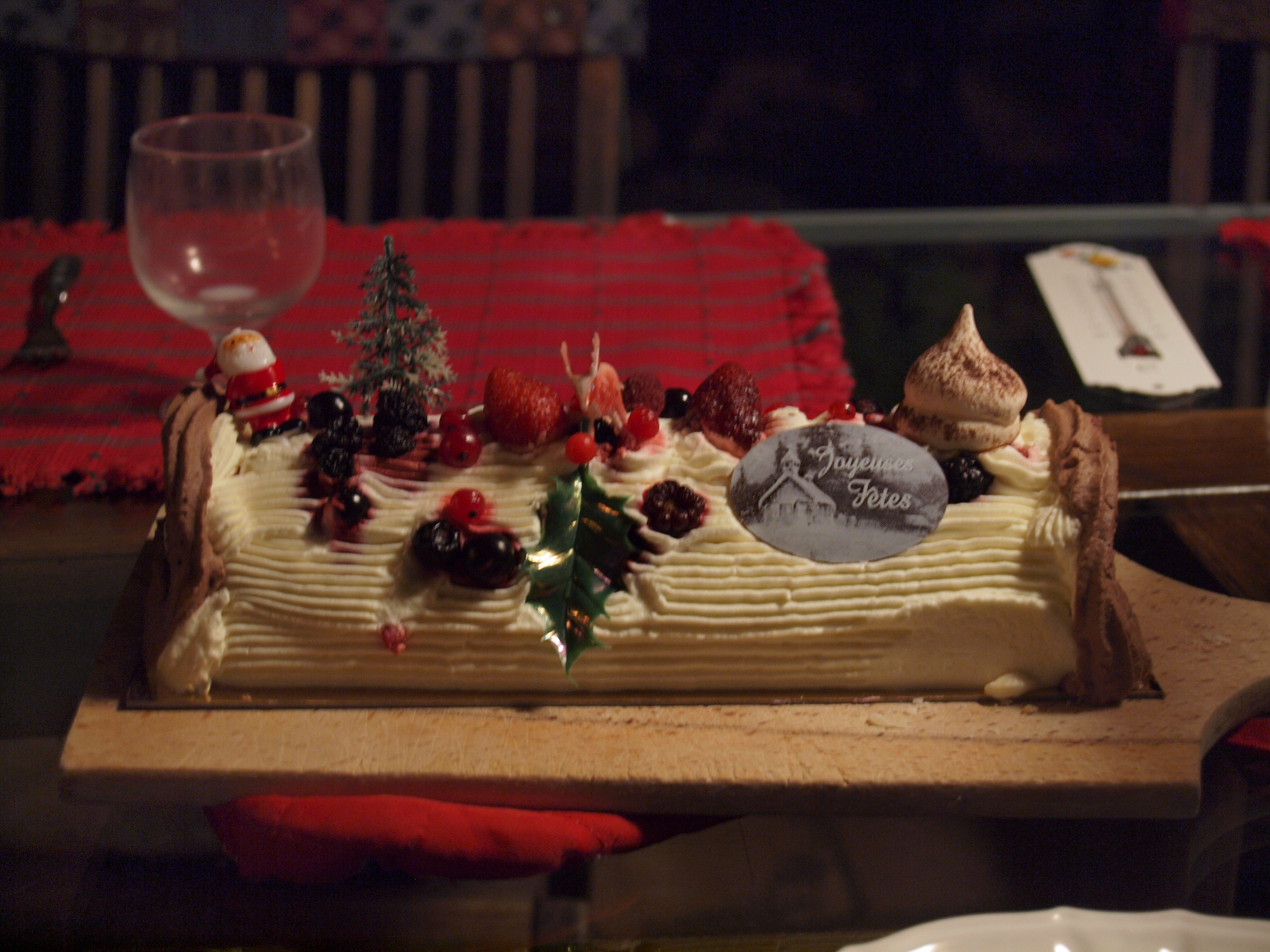

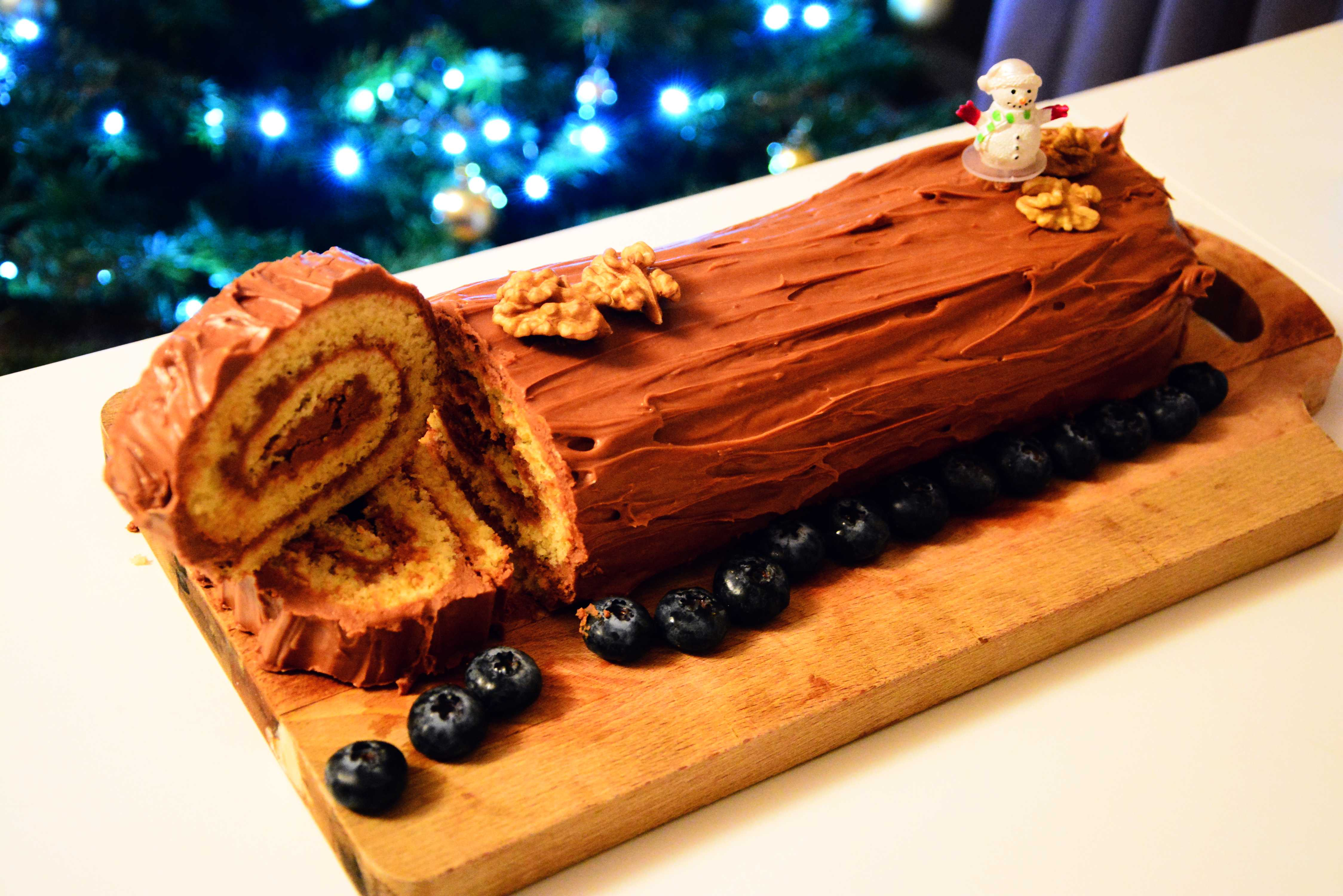

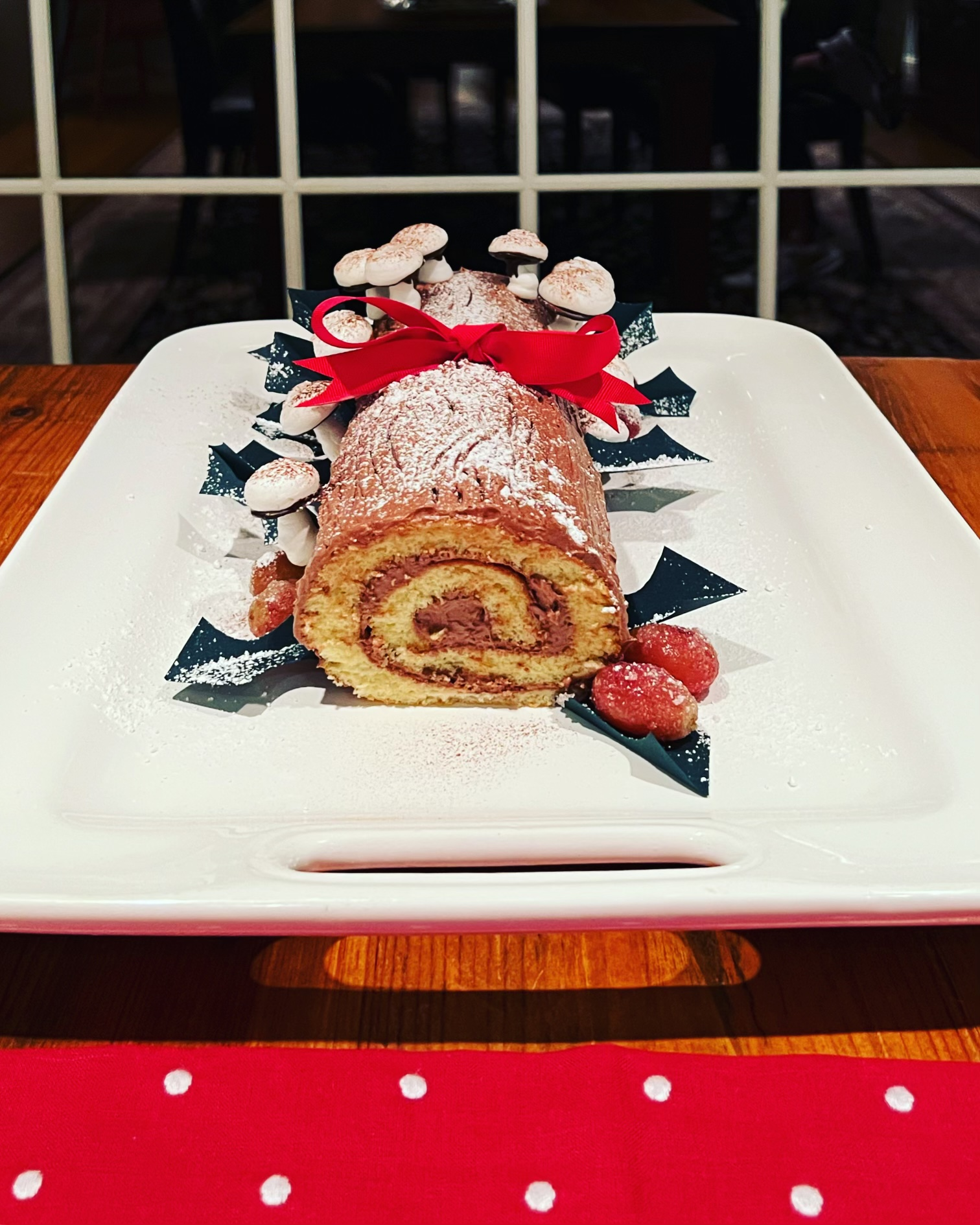

== See also ==
- Christmas cake
- List of desserts
- Nut roll
- Pionono
- Swiss roll
