= Yodels =

Snack cake brand

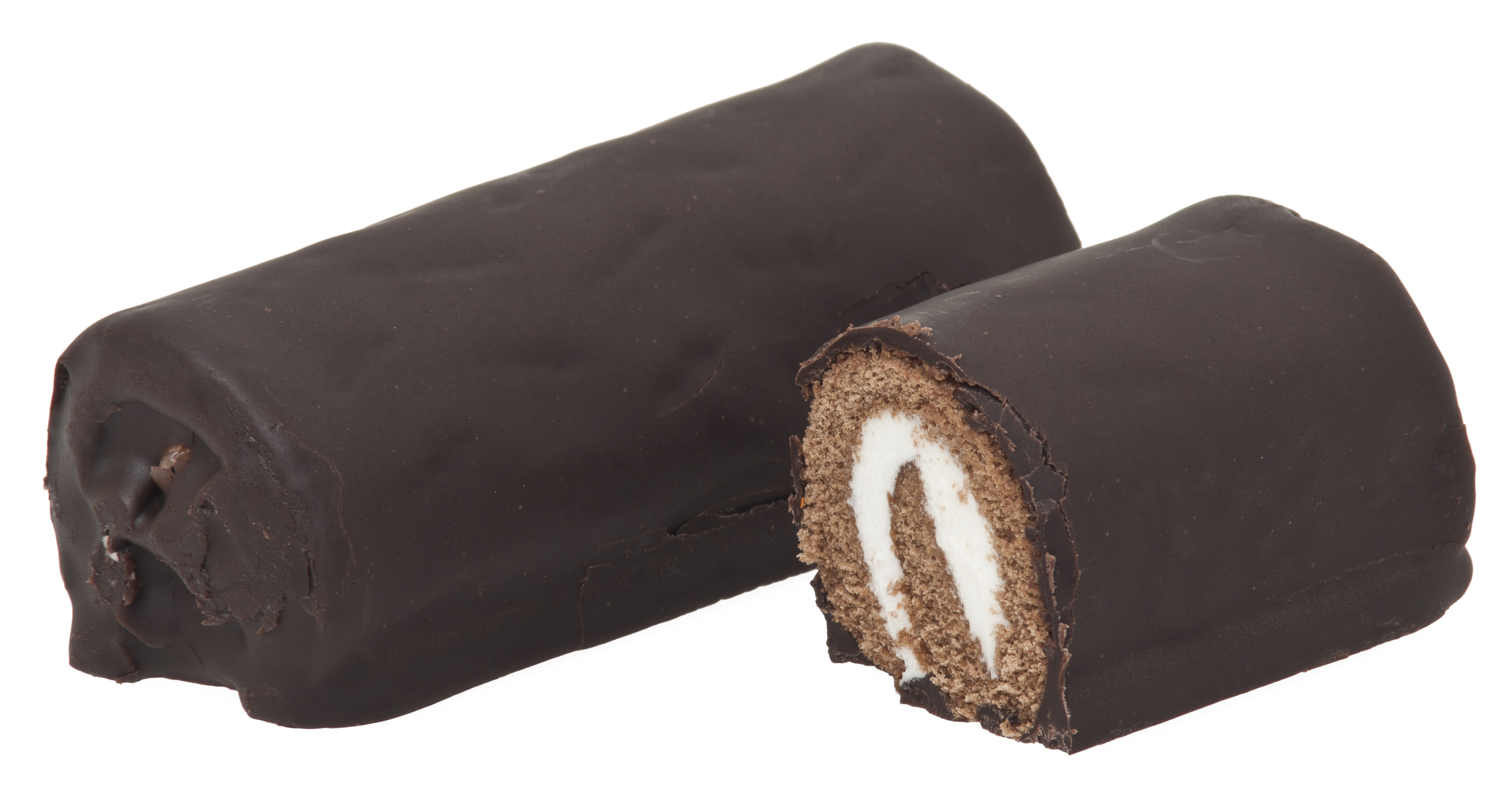
Yodels

Yodels are frosted, cream-filled cakes made by the Drake's company, which was bought by McKee Foods after former owner Old HB went bankrupt. Yodels are distributed on the East Coast of the United States. They are similar to Hostess Brands' Ho Hos and Little Debbie's Swiss Cake Rolls.

== Description ==
Each plastic package of Yodels contains two cakes.

== In popular culture ==
=== Comics ===
- Yodels are named as the preferred food source of the character Jeri in the comic strip PreTeena.

=== Film ===
- The snacks were featured in the movie Click (2006), in which the main character Michael Newman (played by Adam Sandler) becomes morbidly obese after eating Yodels for 10 years.

=== Television ===
- They are often named as a favorite snack food by Fox News Channel vice president and anchor Neil Cavuto.
- In the sitcom Everybody Loves Raymond, Yodels are shared by the characters Ray Barone and Robert Barone in Ray's childhood bedroom, after Robert was gored by a bull in the line of duty.
- They are a favourite of character Doug Heffernan on the show King of Queens.
- In the episode "The Two Mrs. Nahasapeemapetilons" of The Simpsons, Homer Simpson is forced to choose between buying a Yodel or a winning lottery ticket. He ultimately chooses the Yodel.
- In an episode of the reality show Jersey Shore, the cast eats Yodels for dessert following an Italian dinner prepared by Vinny Guadagnino's mother Paula.
- In an episode of Kevin Can Wait, they are referred to as a possible dessert for wedding guests if the family cannot reduce both the number of guests and the total cost of the wedding.
- In an episode of Frasier, Frasier makes reference to Roz being upset about a Twinkie coming out the Yodel chute of a vending machine.
- In the episode "Fast Feud" of the hidden camera-practical joke reality show Impractical Jokers, Joe Gatto tries to convince someone to house-sit for him while a Tibetan monk named "Chen" eats an entire dinner plate full of Yodels in the background for the entire duration of the scene. Joe points at the monk and says, "It's a Yodel factory over there". Furthermore, Joe later says, "It's paramount that Chen doesn't run out of Yodels". The scene concludes with the monk asking Joe to get him more Yodels

== See also ==
- List of brand name snack foods
