= Nutty Buddy =

American cookie brand

- Type: Snack food
- Place of origin: United States
- Created by: McKee Foods
- Invented: 1959; 67 years ago

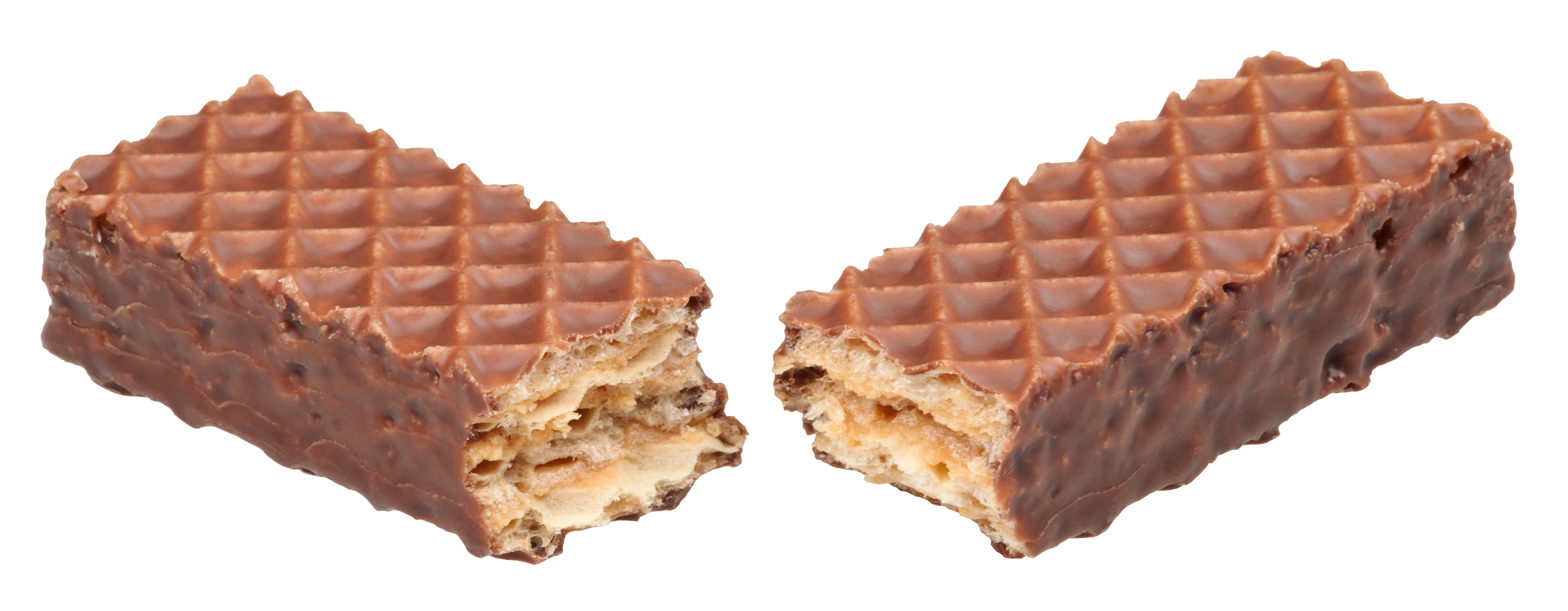
A Nutty Buddy split

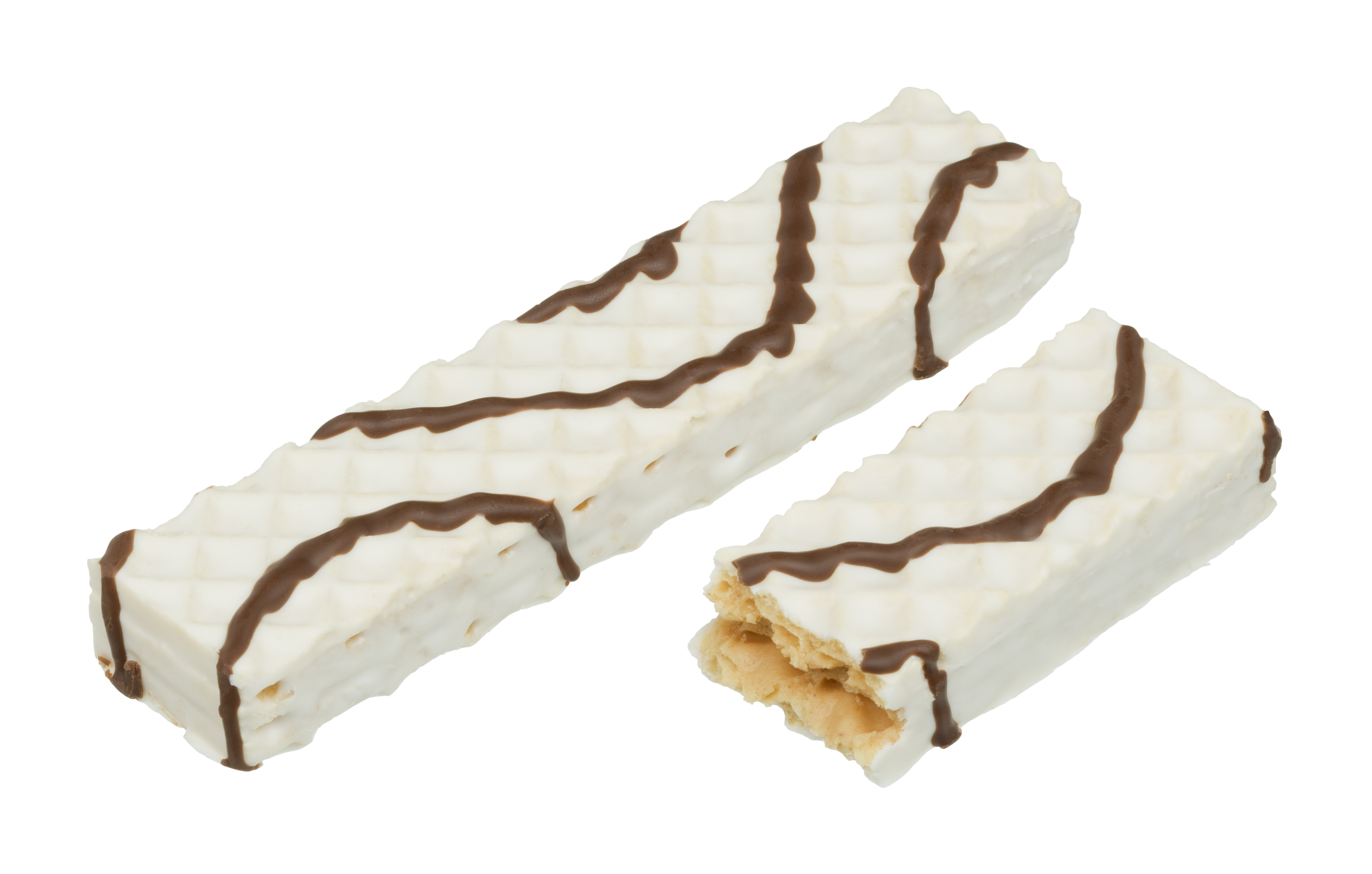
A "zebra" variant of the Nutty Buddy

Nutty Buddy, formerly known as Nutty Bars, are a snack manufactured by McKee Foods under the Little Debbie brand since 1959. The snack consists of four wafers sandwiched together in a peanut butter mixture and covered with a "chocolatey coating".

Little Debbie also provides seasonal Nutty Buddy Bars which includes the "Red, White & Blue" Nutty Buddy Bar and the "Be My Valentine" Nutty Buddy Bar. There is also a Zebra Nutty Buddy Bar.
