= McKee Foods =

Snack food and granola manufacturer

McKee Foods Corporation
- Logo of McKee Foods Corporation
- Type: Private
- Industry: Food processing
- Founded: Chattanooga, Tennessee, U.S. (1934; 92 years ago)
- Founders: O.D. McKee; Ruth McKee
- Headquarters: Collegedale, Tennessee, U.S.
- Key people: Mike McKee; Rusty McKee; Angie McKee; Ellsworth McKee; Jack McKee; Cole Smith; Debbie McKee-Fowler
- Products: Snacks; cereal; granola bars
- Brands: Drake's Cakes; Fieldstone Bakery; Little Debbie; Sunbelt Bakery
- Revenue: ▲$836 million (2021)
- Number of employees: 6,800 (As of September 2021)
- Website: www.mckeefoods.com

McKee Foods Corporation is a privately held and family-owned American snack food and granola manufacturer headquartered in Collegedale, Tennessee. The corporation is the maker of Drake's Cakes, Fieldstone Bakery snacks and cereal, Little Debbie snacks, and Sunbelt Bakery granola and cereal. The company also formerly operated Heartland Brands.

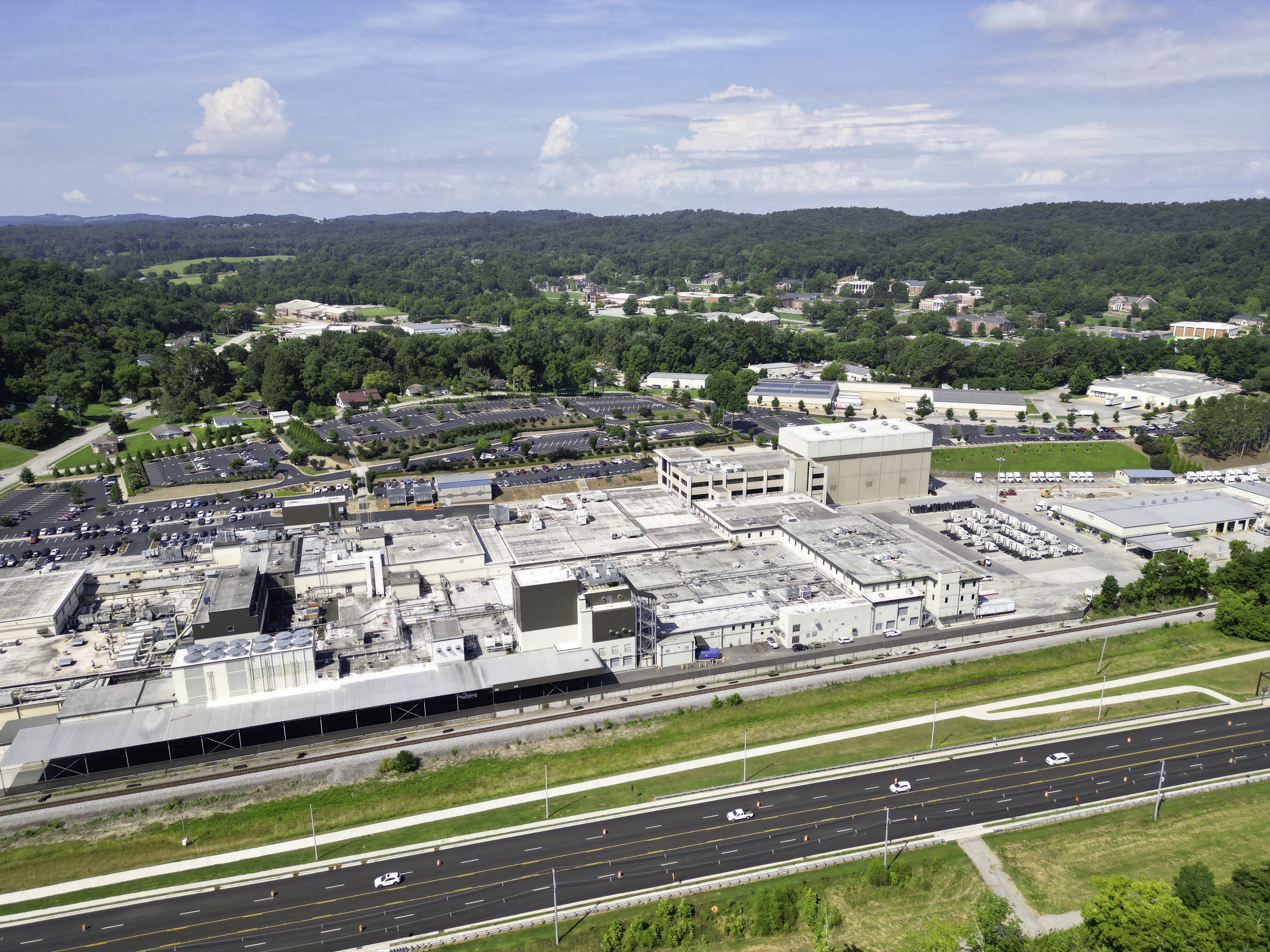
McKee's headquarters and plant in Collegedale

== History ==
The company was founded in 1934 by Oather Dorris "O.D." McKee and Ruth McKee. Oather started out selling cakes from his 1928 Whippet in the Chattanooga area. Wanting to expand, he bought a small bakery, Jack's Cookie Company. The bakery did well for a few years, but O.D. was still looking to expand. His father-in-law, however, did not share his ideas. O.D. decided to sell his business and start over.

The McKees moved to Charlotte, North Carolina, into a new bakery designed by O.D. After some time, they sold the Charlotte plant. They moved back to Chattanooga in the early 1950s when Cecil King, Ruth's brother, was in poor health and needed help. They decided to buy back the bakery, which was renamed McKee Baking Company from King's Bakery in 1962, and run it themselves.

McKee Baking Company moved to Collegedale in 1957. In 1991, McKee Baking Company became McKee Foods Corporation.

Ellsworth McKee, the son of company-founder O.D. McKee, took over, but retired from day-to-day operations in September 2012 and retains the position of company chairman.

It was announced on January 28, 2013, that McKee Foods would pay $27.5 million for Hostess Brands' Drake's brand, which includes Ring Dings, Yodels, and Devil Dogs products. The bankruptcy court approved the purchase on April 9, 2013.

As of 2013, McKee ships more than 900 million cartons of Little Debbie products each year.

== Brands ==
=== Little Debbie ===
Little Debbie logo, 1985–2013

Little Debbie products

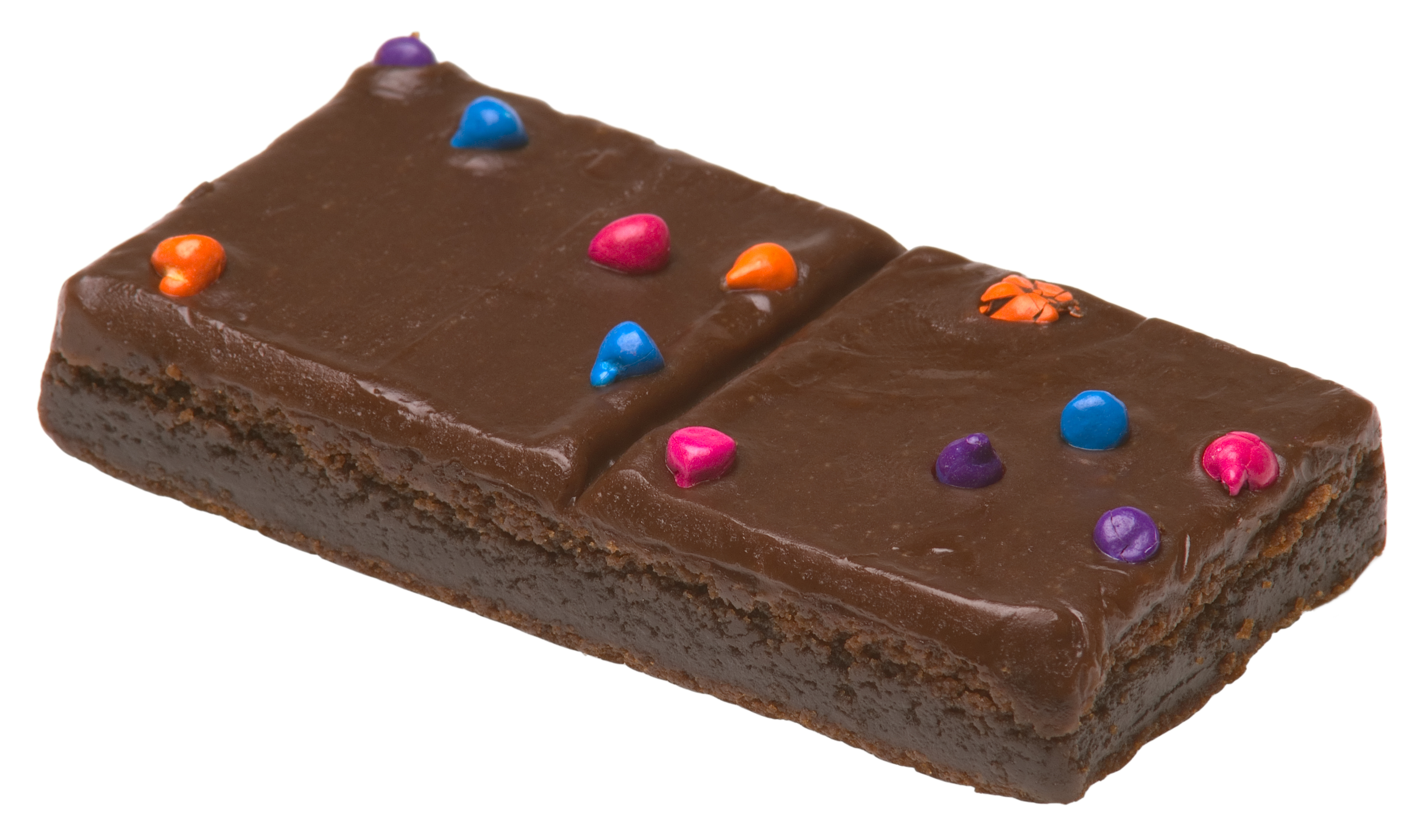
Cosmic Brownie

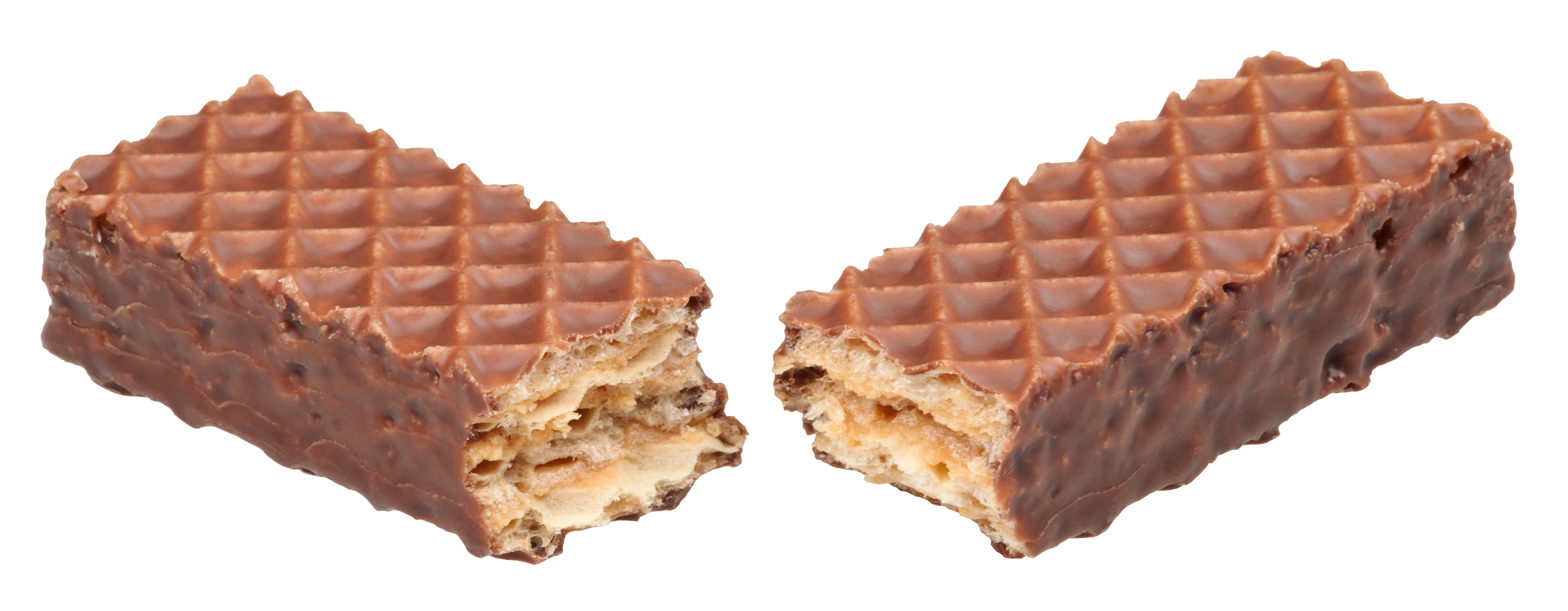
Nutty Buddy

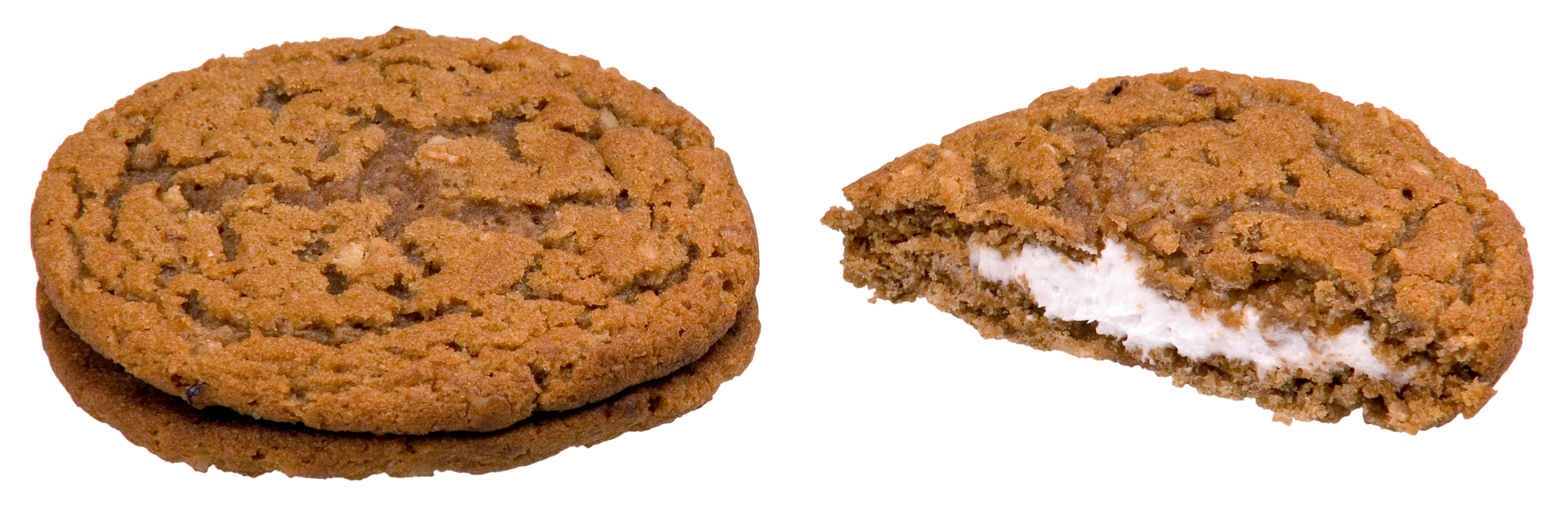
Oatmeal Creme Pie

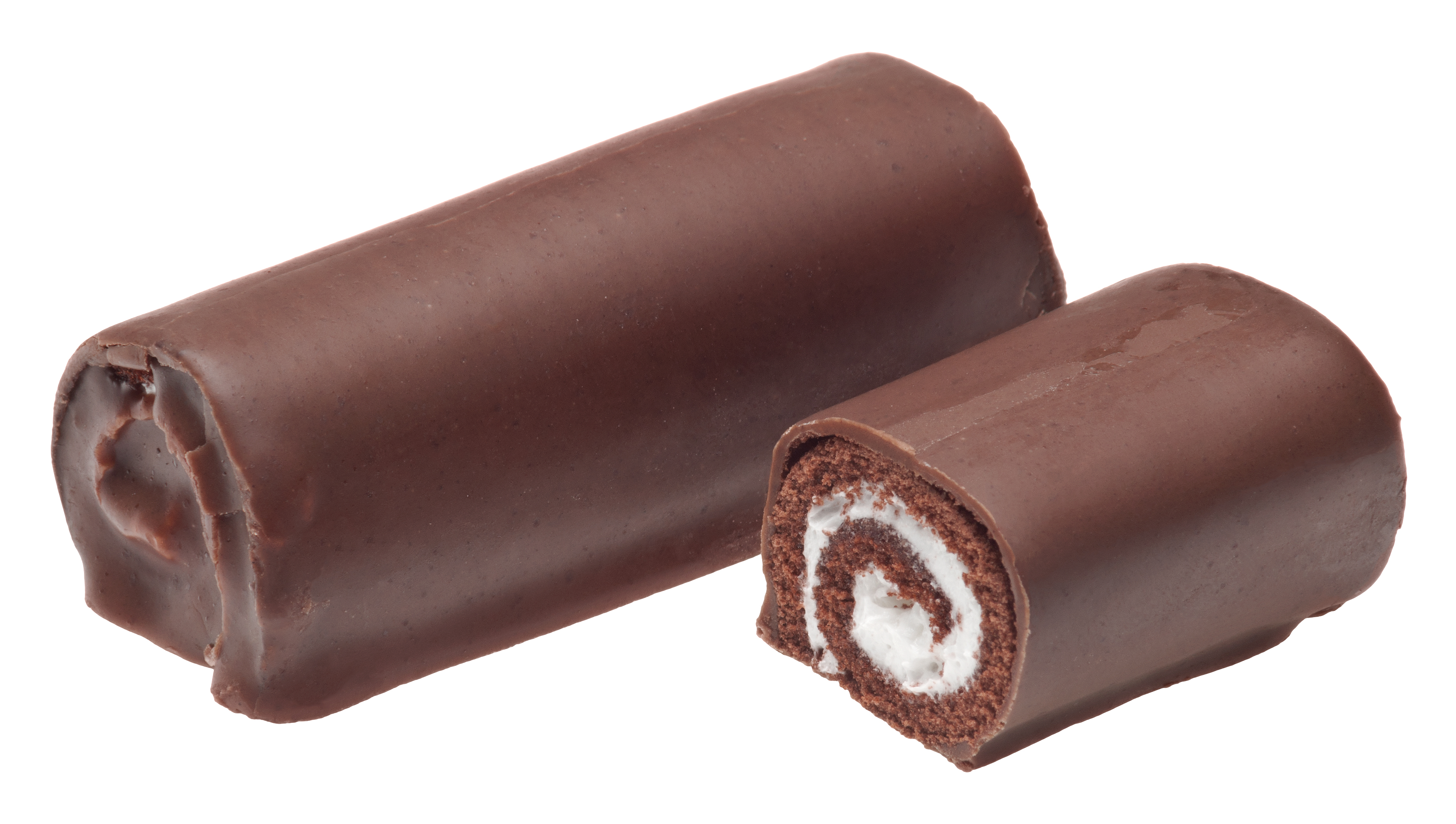
Swiss Cake Roll

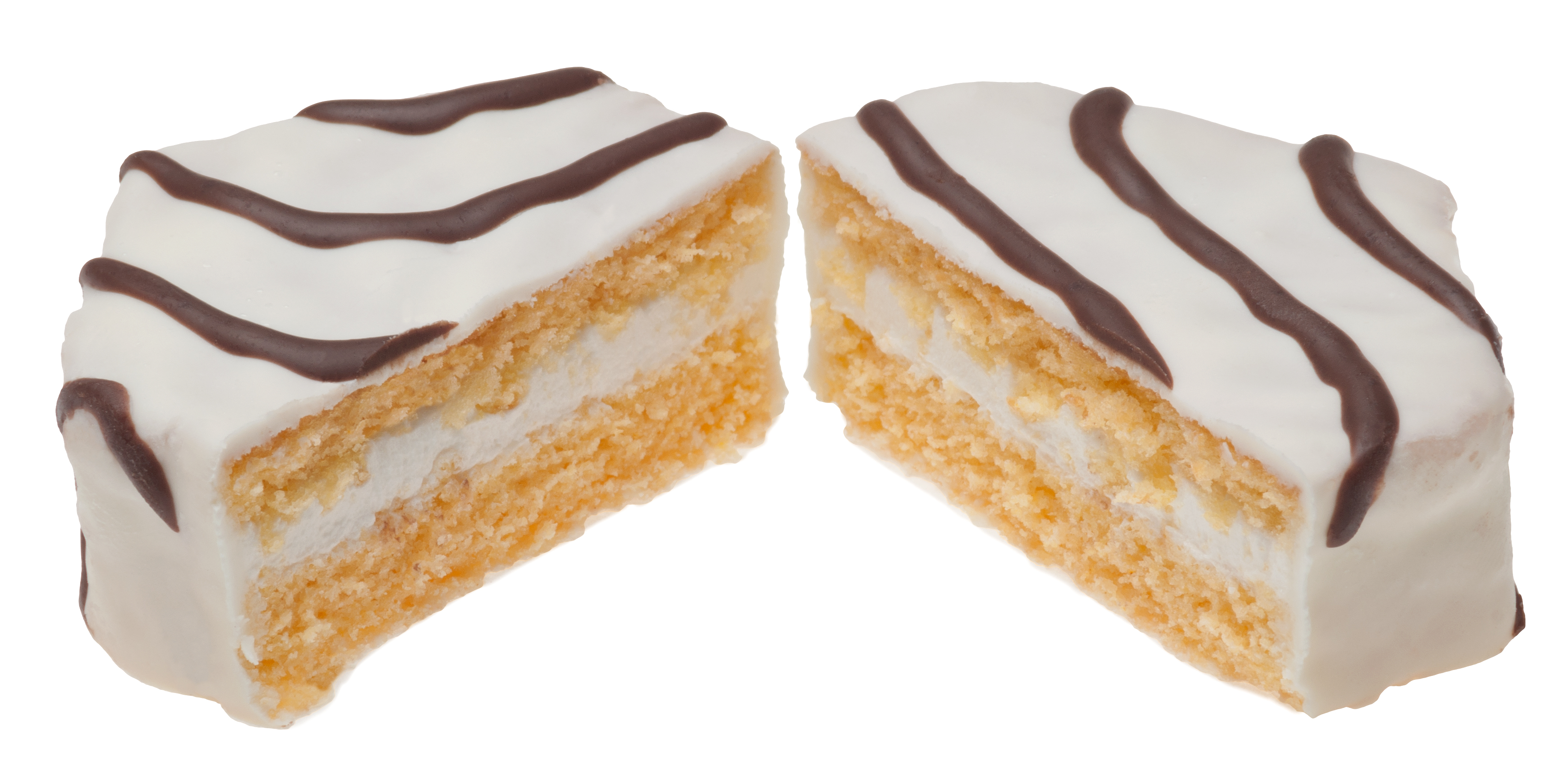
Zebra Cake

Little Debbie products are primarily cookie and cake-based dessert snacks. They come in dozens of varieties, including the top-selling Swiss Cake Rolls, Nutty Bars, Fudge Rounds, Cloud Cakes, Cosmic Brownies, Zebra Cakes, and Oatmeal Creme Pies. Little Debbie products are available in most discount, grocery, and convenience stores, both in boxes and as individually wrapped items.

In 1960, company founders O.D. and Ruth McKee decided to name a product after one of their grandchildren, four-year-old Debbie. Now Debbie McKee-Fowler serves as Executive Vice-President and serves on the McKee Foods Board of Directors. The original image of Debbie used on packaging and advertising, which began on August 23, 1960, was based on a black-and-white photo. Full-color portraits of Little Debbie started later in 1960. Artist Pearl Mann of Atlanta created the original color artwork. Following instructions, she made the little girl look older, around 8 or 9. Minor changes were made to the logo in 1985 and again in 2013.

The Little Debbie brand has sponsored NASCAR teams since the 1990s, most notably the Wood Brothers No. 21 Ford Fusion in the NASCAR Sprint Cup Series from 2006 to 2008. The brand switched to the No. 47 JTG Daugherty Racing team in the 2009 season, after sponsoring both teams in 2008. From sundown Friday to sundown Saturday, the Little Debbie logos are covered or removed, and the crew wears non-Little Debbie attire as a condition of sponsorship because the McKees are Seventh-day Adventists, and Saturday is the Adventist Sabbath.

McKee withdrew permission for Little Debbie to appear in the animated movie Foodfight! after learning that the filmmakers planned to depict another character catcalling her.

As of late 2022, the cakes will not be sold in US Department of Defense, Defense Commissary Agency and Navy Exchange commissaries. McKee has said that the regulatory standards required of McKee Foods are too costly to continue supplying the commissaries.

Also as of late-2022, the cakes will not be sold in Canada. The company said that their only distributor chose to "terminate their business relationship" and McKee was not actively looking for another Canadian distributor.

=== Drake's ===
Drake's is a baking company in Wayne, New Jersey. Originally an independent company, Drake's was owned by Hostess from 1998 to 2012; McKee Foods acquired Drake's line when Hostess liquidated in bankruptcy in 2012. The Drake's brand distributes snack cakes such as Ring Dings, Yodels, Devil Dogs, Yankee Doodles, Sunny Doodles, Funny Bones, and coffee cake. Their mascot is Webster, a smiling drake (a male duck) holding a spoon and wearing a chef's hat and neckerchief.

=== Fieldstone Bakery ===
Products sold under the Fieldstone Bakery brand include whole grain snacks, granola, pastries, and cookies.

=== Sunbelt Bakery ===
Sunbelt logo, 2002–2009

Sunbelt Bakery products include a variety of granola bars, fruit snacks, and cereals.

=== Heartland Brands ===
The company previously sold granola cereals and pie crusts under the Heartland brand. McKee acquired the brand, which dated to 1968, in 1998. The brand was in use until at least 2018.

== Bakeries ==
- Gentry, Arkansas
- Stuarts Draft, Virginia
- Collegedale, Tennessee
- Kingman, Arizona
