= Custard cream =

Type of biscuit popular in UK and Ireland

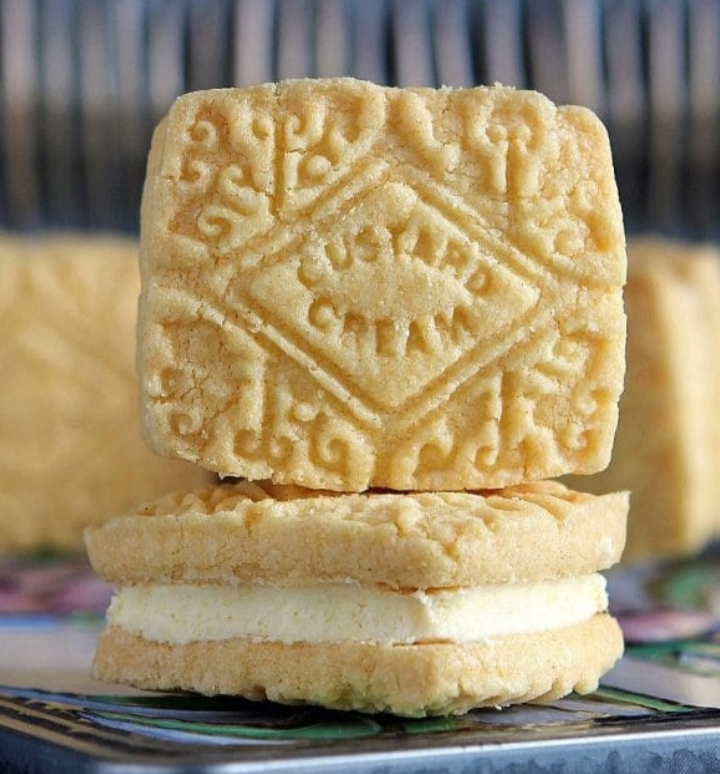
- A couple of custard cream biscuits
- Type: Biscuit
- Place of origin: United Kingdom
- Main ingredients: Biscuits, buttercream (traditionally vanilla)

A custard cream is a type of sandwich biscuit popular in the United Kingdom, Ireland and parts of the Commonwealth. It consists of two embossed biscuits filled with a sweet, custard-flavoured cream.

Traditionally, the filling was buttercream (which is still used in most homemade recipes) but nowadays cheaper fats have replaced butter in mass-produced biscuits. The filling has a vanilla flavour and as such is more akin to the taste of custard made with custard powder than egg custard. The precise date of the custard cream’s invention remains uncertain. Some sources claim it debuted in 1908 while others suggest 1913. Usually, they have an elaborate baroque design stamped onto them, originating in the Victorian era and representing ferns.

Some British and Irish supermarkets produce their own brand versions, with flavour variations including lemon, orange, banana, chocolate, strawberry, coffee, tangerine, rhubarb & custard and coconut. There is a digestive cream version available, in which the biscuit is replaced with a digestive biscuit.

In a 2007 poll of 7,000 Britons, 9 out of 10 voted custard creams to be their favourite biscuit. In 2009, custard creams were listed among the top ten biscuits for dunking into tea in a national poll. In the same year, a humorous study by Mindlab International listed custard creams as the most likely biscuit to cause injury or harm, scoring a so-called "risk rating" of 5.64.

== See also ==
- Vienna Fingers
- Malted milk (biscuit)
- Nice biscuit
