= Hobnob biscuit =

British brand of biscuit

Hobnobs
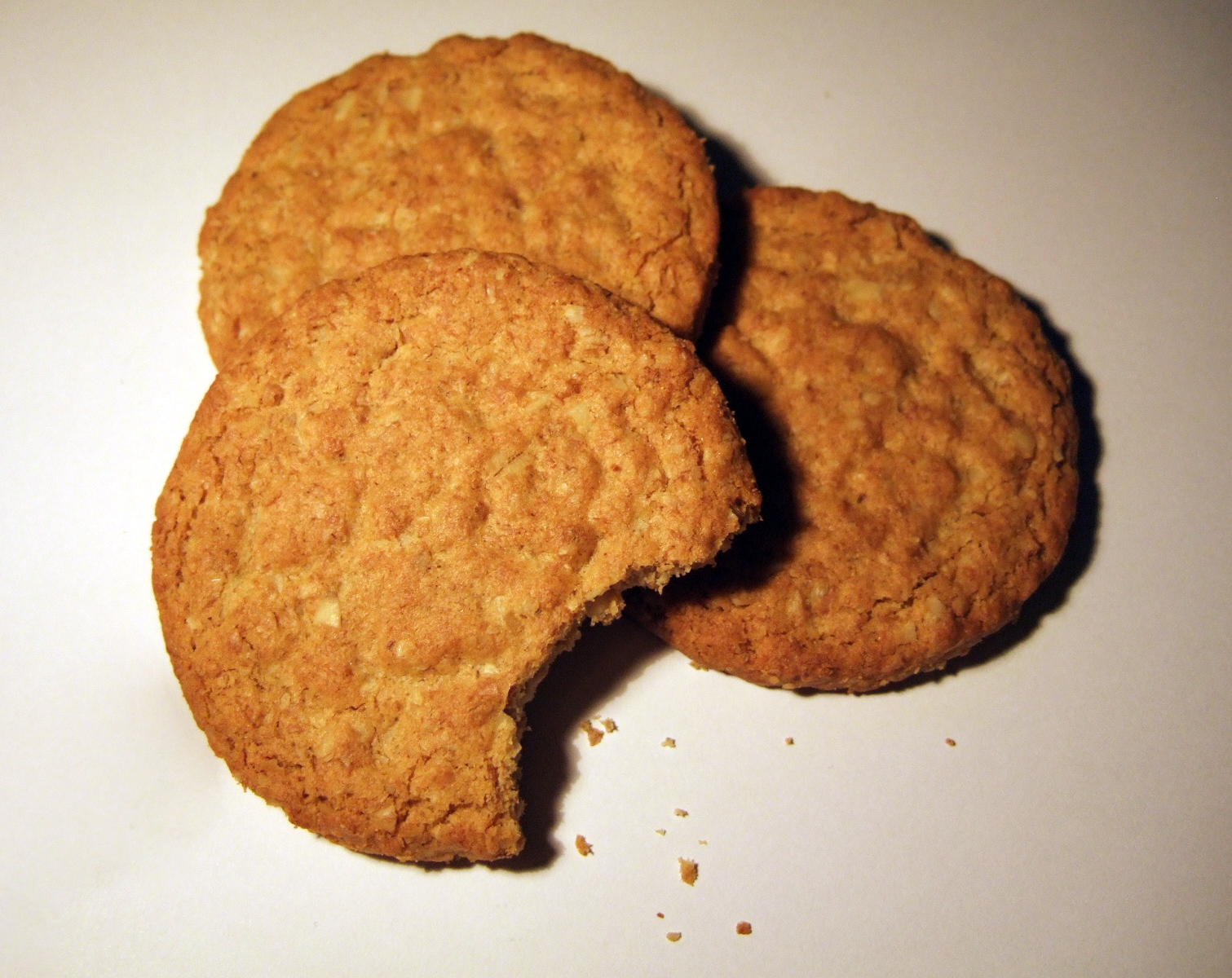
- Type: Oat
- Place of origin: United Kingdom
- Created by: McVitie's
- Invented: 1985; 1987 (Chocolate variant)
- Main ingredients: Rolled oats

Hobnobs (sometimes stylized as HobNobs) is a biscuit brand owned by British company McVitie's. They are made from rolled oats and are similar to a flapjack-digestive biscuit hybrid. McVitie's launched Hobnobs in 1985 and a milk chocolate variant in 1987. They are primarily sold in the United Kingdom, the Isle of Man and Ireland but are available in Australia, New Zealand, South Africa and several European and Asian countries (e.g. Taiwan, China, and Hong Kong). In Italy they are now marketed as a variety of digestive biscuits, having previously been known as Suncrok. They were also released in Canada in November 2012, made available in Wal-Mart's British modular section in their food aisles.

The McVitie's Hobnob is the third-most-popular biscuit in the UK to "dunk" into tea, with its chocolate variant sixth. In 2014 a UK survey declared the Chocolate Hobnob the nation's favourite biscuit.

== History ==
Abbey Crunch (precursor to the Hobnob), formerly manufactured by McVitie's

The Colchester Priory Biscuit, a precursor to the Hobnob, was created in the 1800s by two unknown local bakers. This later morphed into Abbey Crunch, and in turn the Hobnob, both of which were sweeter due to the addition of golden syrup. Abbey Crunches, sold with the tagline "the original oat biscuit", were packed into a PET tray created by blow moulding and protected from moisture with a Rayophane MXXT film wrapping. Since McVitie's have stopped manufacturing Abbey Crunch, cooks such as Mary Berry have created their own recipes for home baking.

The commercial recipe for Hobnob biscuits was introduced by McVitie's in the UK in 1985. A best seller, demand for the plain Hobnobs led to the introduction of a chocolate variant in 1987. The biscuit is available in many varieties, including dark chocolate, chocolate orange, and Hobnob bars. Other Hobnobs-branded snacks include a Hobnobs flapjack. Hobnobs contains approx 0.16 g of sodium per biscuit.

The name Hobnob comes from the verb 'to hobnob', which means to spend time being friendly with someone who is important or famous. Channel 4's Secret World of Biscuits programme claims that the name comes from the two words "hob" (suggesting home-cooked on a stove) and "knobbly" referencing the texture.

== Manufacture ==
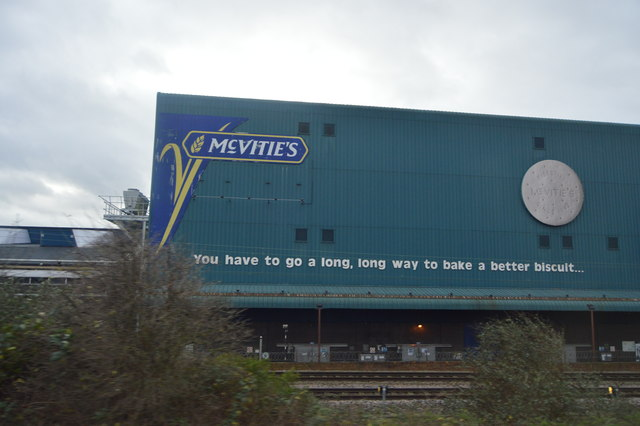
McVitie's factory in Harlesden, north-west London where the chocolate Hobnob is made.

Plain Hobnobs are made at the McVitie's factory in Stockport. The chocolate variety is made at the Harlesden factory in north-west London. The basic ingredients for Hobnobs are oats.

== Marketing ==
The original tagline of the Hobnobs was "one nibble and you're nobbled", and was removed. It has since been brought back, but slightly changed by adding "hob" to the beginning of the last word.

The tagline "Chocolate now has Hobnobs underneath" was used for the introduction in the UK of chocolate Hobnobs.
