= Digestive =

Digestive may refer to:

== Biology ==
- Digestion, biological process of metabolism

== Food and drink ==
- Digestif, small beverage at the end of a meal
- Digestive biscuit, a British semi-sweet biscuit
