= Rich tea =

Type of sweet biscuit

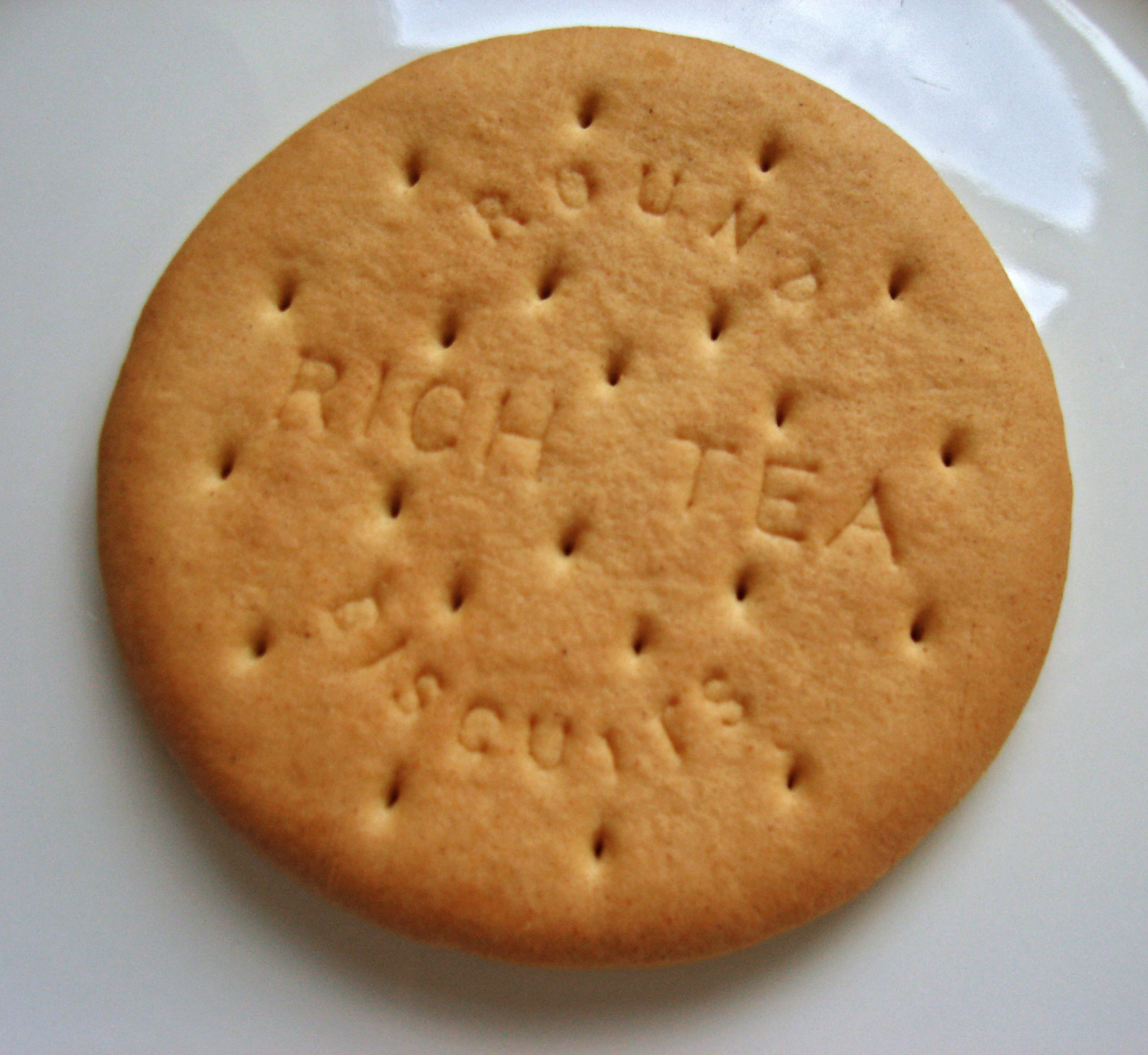
- Type: Biscuit
- Place of origin: England
- Region or state: Yorkshire
- Invented: 19th century
- Main ingredients: Wheat flour, sugar, vegetable oil, and malt extract
- Food energy (per serving): 38 (per biscuit)

Rich tea is a type of sweet biscuit; the ingredients generally include wheat flour, sugar, vegetable oil and malt extract. Originally called Tea Biscuits, they were developed in the 19th century in Yorkshire, England for the upper classes as a light snack between full-course meals. One of the best-selling biscuits in the British Isles, the biscuit is also popular in Malta and Cyprus. The plain flavour and consistency of rich tea make them particularly suitable for dunking in tea and coffee.

McVitie's has used the brand name "Rich Tea" since 1891 and remains the most well-known manufacturer in the UK. Since 2000, most major supermarkets sell an own-brand version of the biscuits.

They are also sold as a finger variety and, as Rich Tea Creams, a long thin rectangular version with vanilla cream sandwiched between two biscuits (made by Fox's). The Morning Coffee biscuit is rectangular rather than round but is similar to the rich tea.

In 2011 Prince William chose a groom's cake for his wedding reception made from 1,700 McVitie's rich tea biscuits and 17 kilograms (37 lb) of chocolate.

== See also ==
- Biscuit tin
- Digestive biscuits, biscuits with fibre and a dark colour from the sweet outer layers of wheat
- Malted milk (biscuit), biscuits that contain both malt and milk
- Marie biscuit, round biscuits with vanilla flavouring
- Picnic biscuit
