= Chocolate biscuit =

Biscuit flavoured with or covered in chocolate

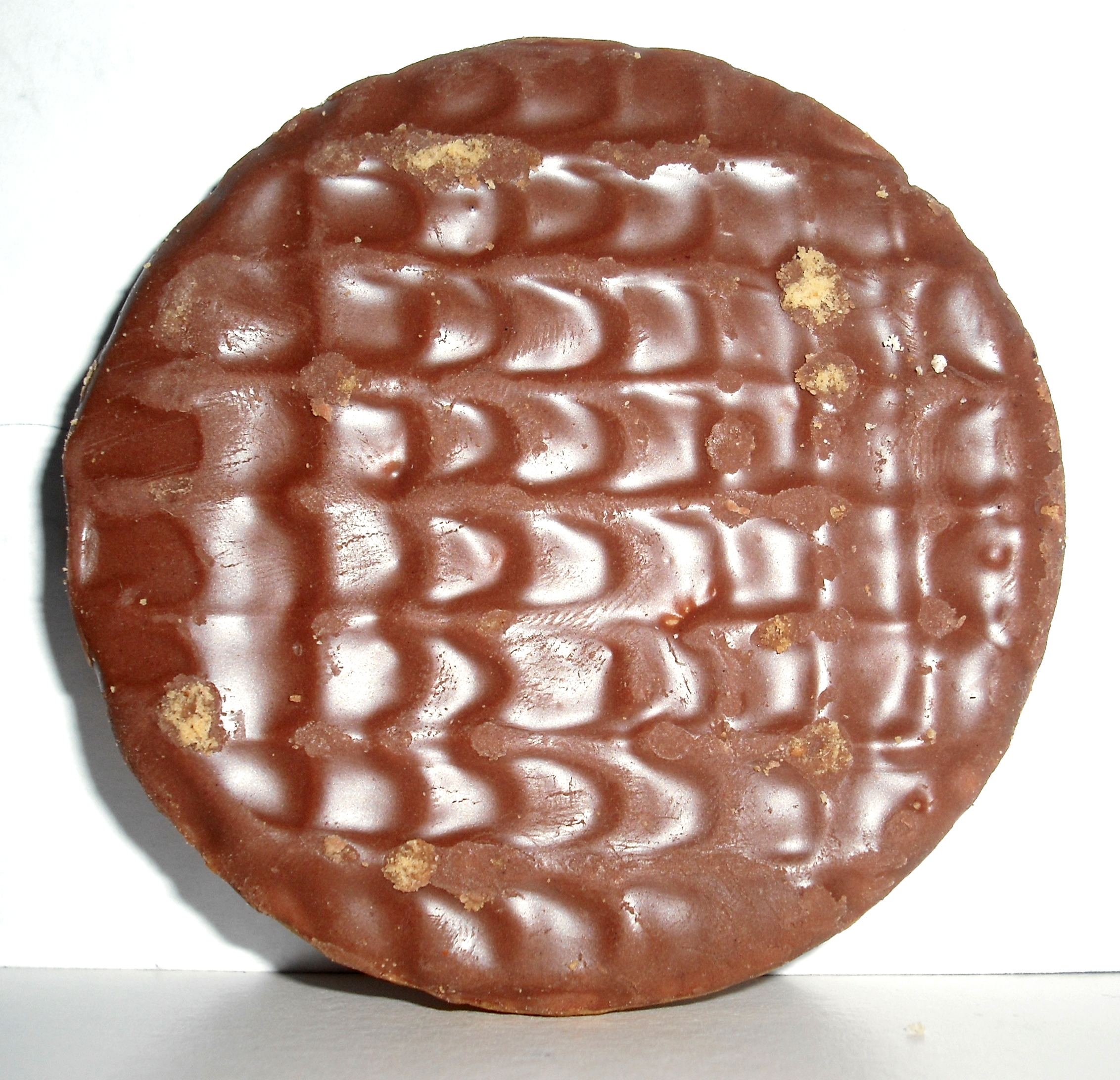
- A chocolate-covered digestive biscuit
- Type: Biscuit
- Main ingredients: Flour, cocoa powder or chocolate

A chocolate biscuit is a biscuit (called "cookie" in the US) which is covered in chocolate, or which has been made by replacing some of the flour with cocoa powder.

Chocolate biscuits are quite popular in places all over the world, particularly the United Kingdom. The composition and recipe may vary considerably and there is often legislation to specify how the biscuit may be described. In the United Kingdom, a biscuit made without an external coating may only be described as "chocolate" if it contains at least 3% of dry fat-free cocoa solids. If there is a coating, this must contain cocoa butter as the fat to be described as chocolate, rather than just "chocolate-flavoured".

In 1891, the Cadbury brothers filed a patent for a chocolate-coated biscuit.

== Tax ==
The exact structure and composition is significant in determining the taxation applicable in the United Kingdom as value-added tax (VAT). The general principle is that luxury foods such as confectionery are taxable, while basic foodstuffs are not. Case law and rulings have determined that a chocolate-covered biscuit such as a chocolate digestive or KitKat is taxable while a chocolate chip cookie or Jaffa Cake is not.
