= Bourbon biscuit =

British sandwich biscuit

Bourbon
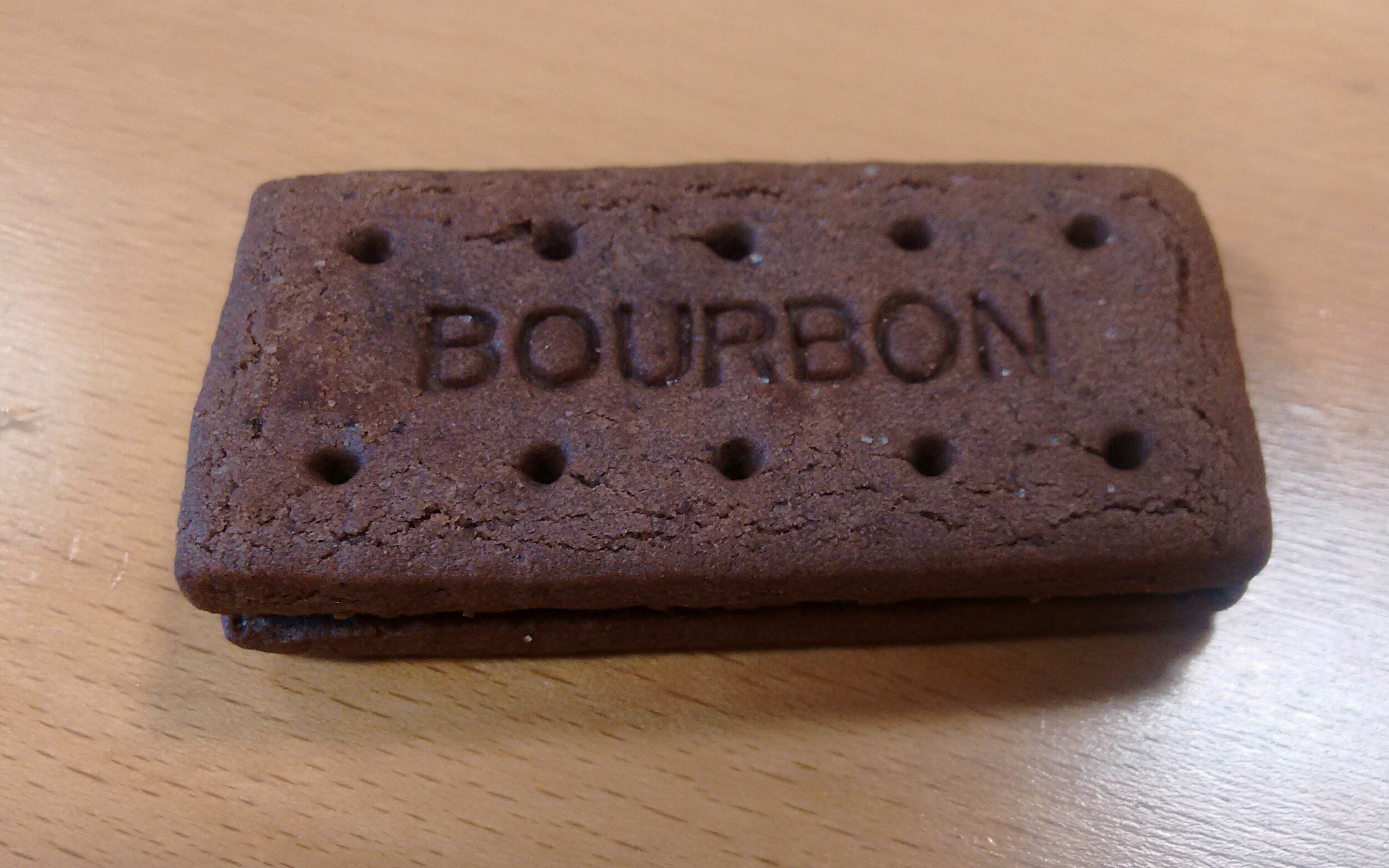
- Alternative names: Bourbon cream, Bourbon, Chocolate Bourbon
- Type: Biscuit
- Place of origin: United Kingdom
- Region or state: London
- Created by: Peek Freans
- Main ingredients: Dark chocolate-flavoured biscuits, chocolate buttercream

The Bourbon (pronounced /ˈbʊərbən/ or /ˈbɔːrbən/) is a sandwich biscuit consisting of two thin rectangular dark chocolate-flavoured biscuits with a chocolate buttercream filling.

Peek Freans have sold a biscuit of this name since at least 1894. The company based in Bermondsey, London, was also the originator of the Garibaldi biscuit. The Bourbon name comes from the former French and Spanish royal House of Bourbon. A 2009 survey found that the Bourbon biscuit was the fifth most popular biscuit in the United Kingdom for dunking in tea.

The small holes in bourbon biscuits are to prevent the biscuits from cracking or breaking during the baking process, by allowing steam to escape. Many other companies make their own version of the biscuit under the "Bourbon" name, including major supermarkets.

McVitie's chocolate-coated Penguin biscuits are made with the same biscuit mix as their bourbon biscuit, but the filling is different.
