= Picnic biscuit =

Type of biscuit

- Type: Biscuit
- Main ingredients: Wheat flour, vegetable oil (palm oil in most recipes), vanilla or cacao

A picnic biscuit is a type of small, rectangular biscuit.

== Mass production ==
In Turkey, the biscuit is mass-produced by Ülker, Eti, Azra, Hazal, and Anı. In Romania, the biscuit is mass-produced by Rostar and Arslan Bifa.

== See also ==
- Rich tea
- List of cookies
