= Biscuit tin =

Containers used to package and sell biscuits

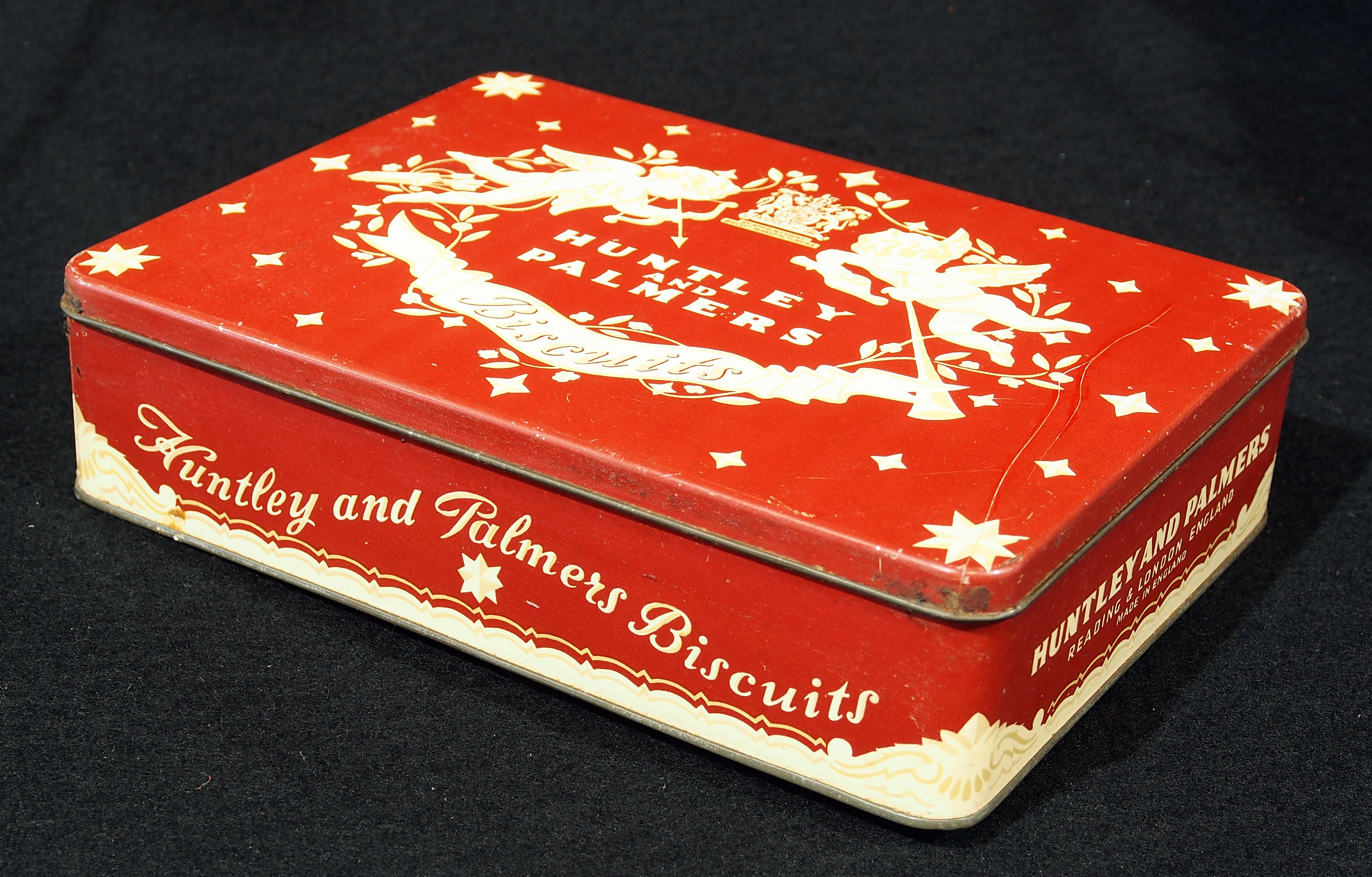
Huntley & Palmers biscuit tin

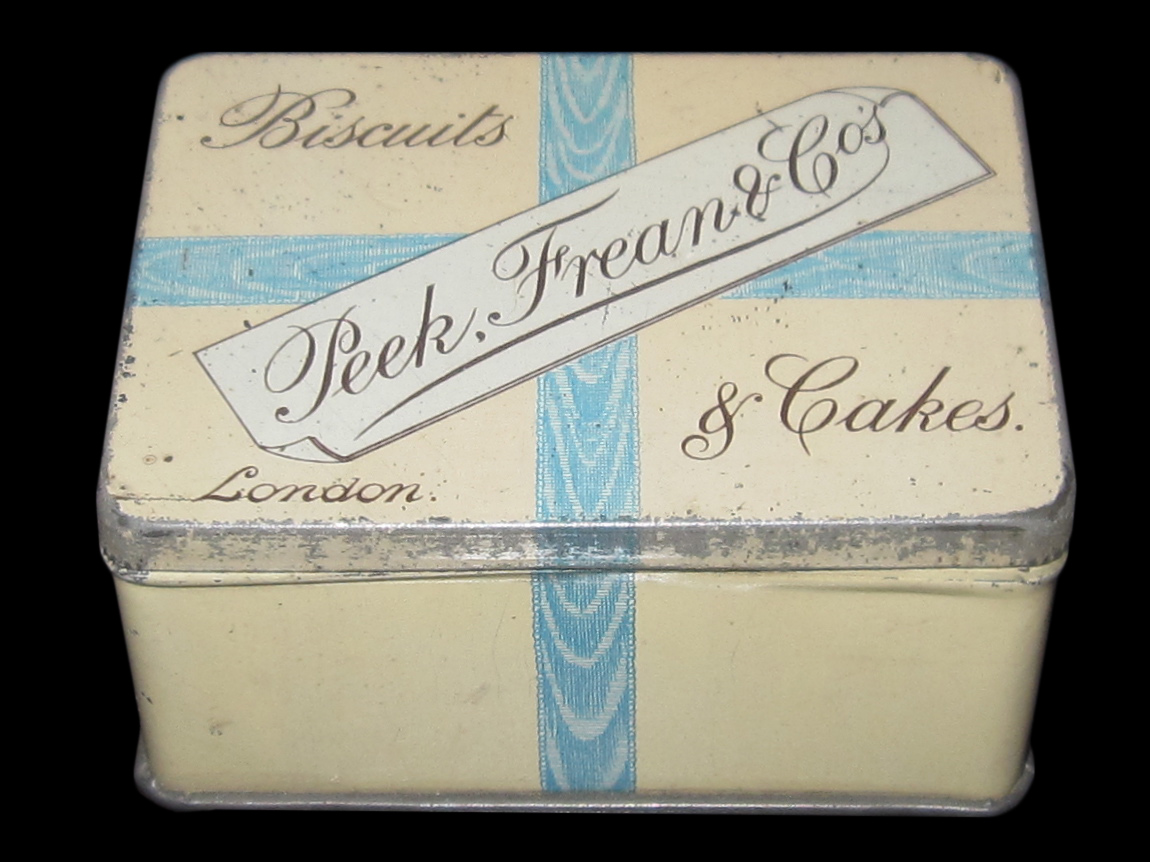
Peek Freans biscuit tin

Biscuit tins are utilitarian or decorative containers used to package and sell biscuits (such as those served during tea) and some confectionery. Invented by Huntley & Palmers in 1831, they are commonly found in households in United Kingdom, Ireland, and Commonwealth countries, but also in continental Europe and French Canada. Popularity in the United States and English Canada spread later in the 20th century. Over 60% of UK households own a biscuit tin.

Because of their appearance, biscuit tins have often been used by charities and by some visitor attractions as fundraising devices since many customers will pay more for a tin of biscuits than it is worth.

== History ==
Biscuit tins are steel cans made of tin plate. This consists of steel sheets thinly coated with tin. The sheets are then bent to shape. By about 1850, Great Britain had become the dominant world supplier of tin plate, through a combination of technical innovation and political control over most of the suppliers of tin ore. Biscuit tin manufacture was a small but prestigious part of the vast industry of tin plate production, which saw a huge increase in demand in the 19th century was directly related to the growing industrialisation of food production, by increasingly sophisticated methods of preservation and the requirements made by changing methods of distribution.

The British biscuit tin came about when the Licensed Grocer's Act 1861 allowed groceries to be individually packaged and sold. Coinciding with the removal of the duty on paper for printed labels, printing directly on to tinplate became common. The new process of offset lithography, patented in 1877, allowed multicoloured designs to be printed onto elaborately shaped tins.

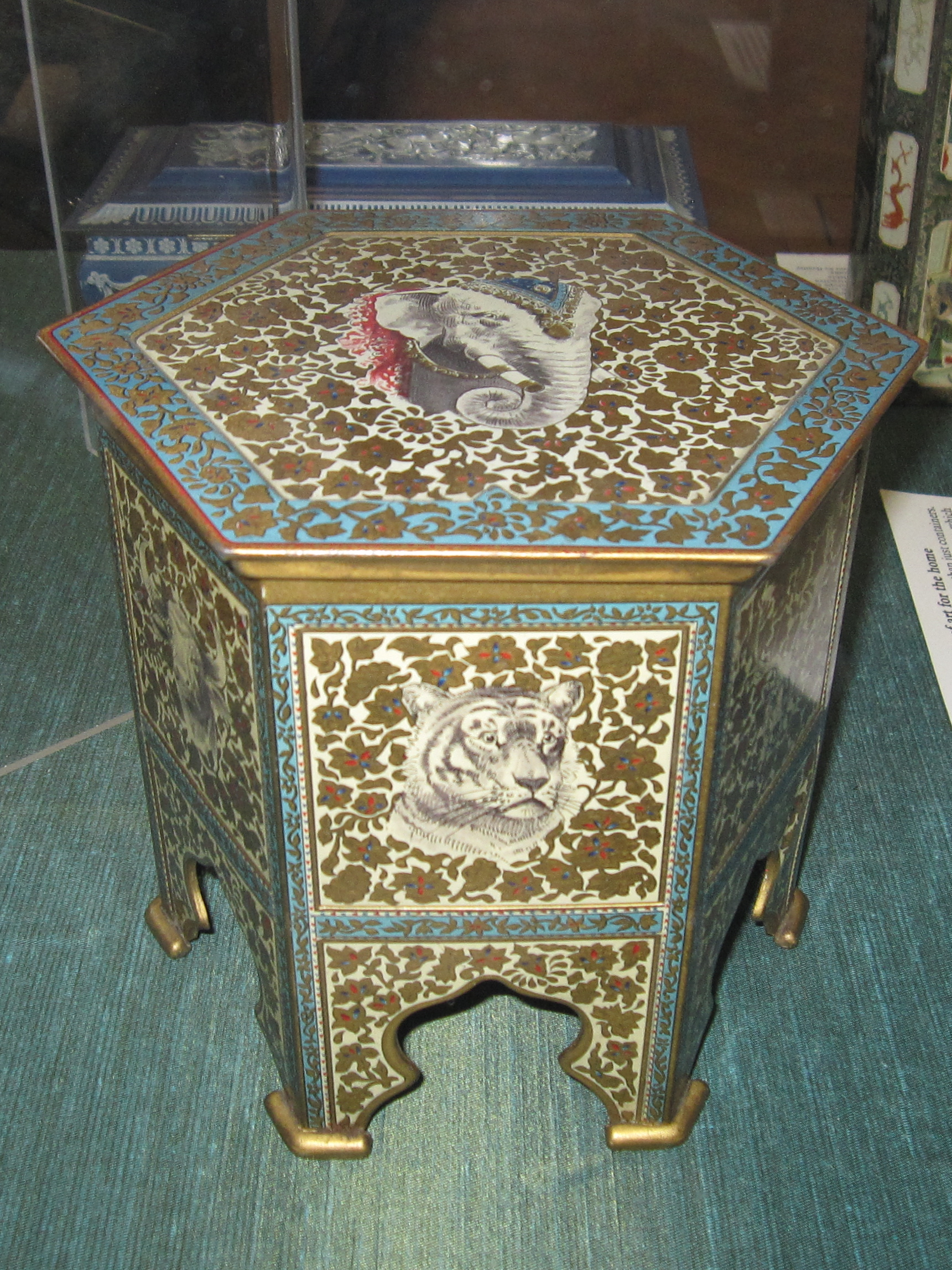
Biscuit tin "Kashmir" in the shape of a small Indian table by Huntley & Palmers, dated 1904

The decorative biscuit tin was invented by Huntley & Palmers in 1831. A decorated biscuit tin was commissioned in 1868 by Huntley & Palmers from the London firm of De La Rue to a design by Owen Jones. Early methods of printing included the transfer process (essentially the method used to decorate porcelain and pottery since about 1750) and the direct lithographic process, which involved laying an inked stone directly on to a sheet of tin. Its disadvantage was that correct colour registration was difficult. The breakthrough in decorative tin plate production was the invention of the offset lithographic process. It consists of bringing a sheet of rubber into contact with the decorated stone, and then setting-off the impression so obtained upon the metal surface. The advantages over previous methods of printing were that any number of colours could be used, correctly positioned, and applied to an uneven surface if necessary. Thus the elaborately embossed, colourful designs that were such a feature of the late Victorian biscuit tin industry became technically possible.

The most exotic designs were produced in the early years of the 20th century, just prior to the First World War. In the 1920s and 1930s, costs had risen substantially and the design of biscuit tins tended to be more conservative, with the exception of the tins targeted at the Christmas market and intended to appeal primarily to children. The designs generally reflected popular interests and tastes.

The advent of the Second World War stopped all production of decorative tin ware and after it ended in 1945, the custom did not enjoy the same popularity as before.

Vintage biscuit tins can be found in various museums and on the market have become collector items.

The New Zealand Parliament has a biscuit tin, bought in the 1980s, from which numbered counters are drawn out to randomly introduce new member's bills. As a result, the member's bill ballot and the wider member's bill process is often referred to as "the biscuit tin" or "democracy by biscuit tin".

== Works of art for the home ==
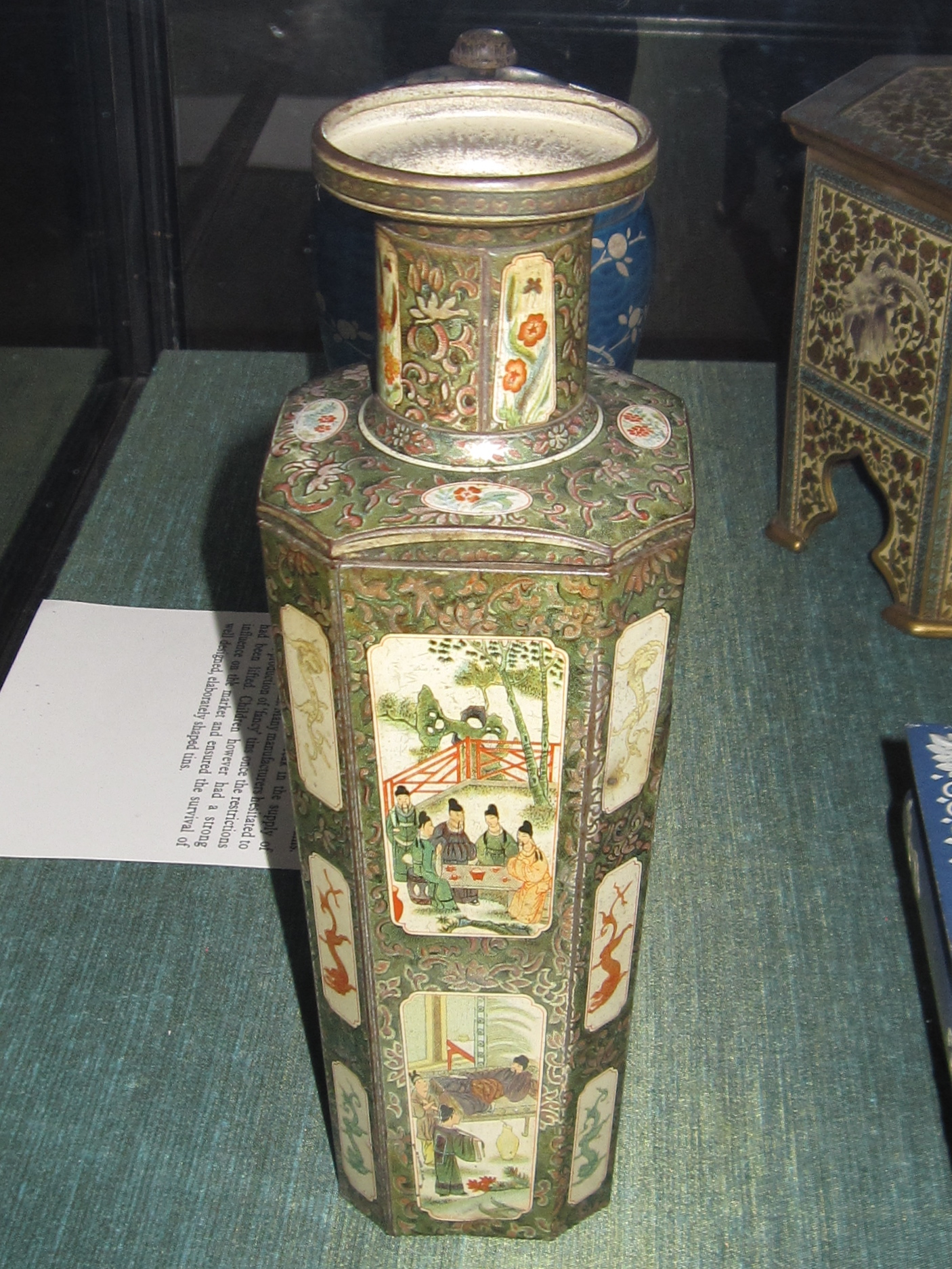
Biscuit tin in the shape of a Chinese vase by Huntley & Palmer

Biscuit tins have always been more than just containers. The manufacturers aimed to make products which would be enjoyed beyond the life span of the biscuits themselves.

Tins shaped like actual objects began to be made in the late 1890s. The earlier tins were shaped like baskets but gradually a whole range of fine art objects appeared. Biscuit tins were no longer aimed merely at children at the Christmas market. They had become useful and decorative parts of the middle class home.

Replicas of Chinese vases could be used as such when the biscuits had been eaten. Boxes imitating porcelain, Wedgwood china or fine wooden boxes mimicked the wonderful objects found in grand houses or in museums.

The First World War saw a break in the supply of decorated biscuit tins. Many manufacturers hesitated to resume production of "fancy" tins once the restrictions had been lifted. Children however had a strong influence on the market and ensured the survival of well designed, elaborately shaped tins.

== Shop biscuit tins ==
British biscuit manufacturers supplied grocer's shops with biscuits packed into large tins, typically containing seven pounds (3.2 kilogrammes). These would be displayed in the shop, and the shopkeeper would weigh out the required amount of biscuits into a paper bag for each customer. Some tins had a glass panel in the lid, so that customers could see the biscuits inside.

== As a household storage container ==
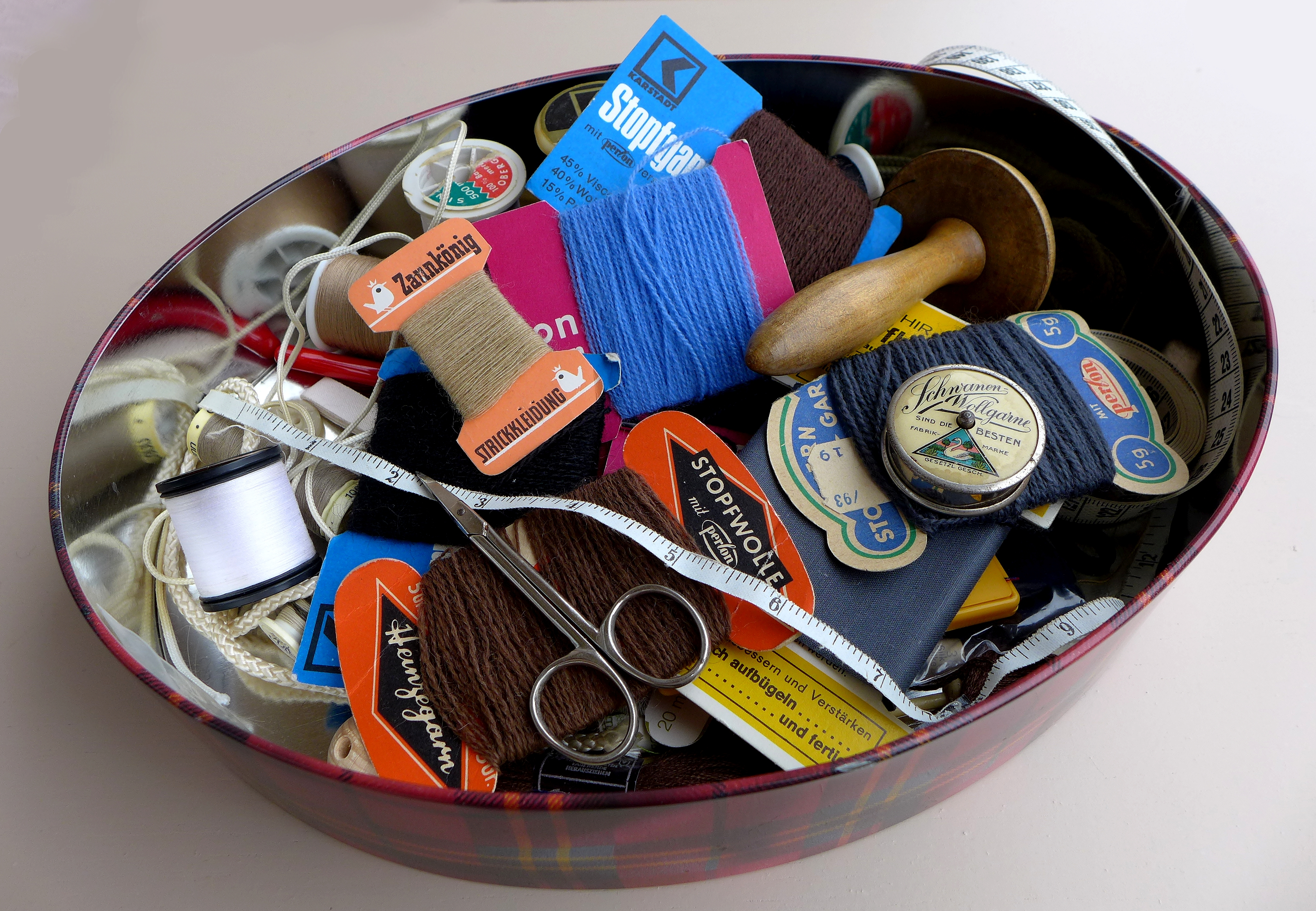
A biscuit tin being used to store sewing supplies

Exported industrial-grade butter cookies are typically packed and sold in cylindrical tins, filled 1-2 layers deep with cupcake/muffin baking cups that are each stacked with 5-6 cookies, with Royal Dansk being a notable example. Due to the uniform packaging and labeling of the cylindrical tin box, butter cookie packages are also known as "The Blue Tin". The tin itself has become a subject of popular culture due to its frequent reuse as a household storage container, particularly for sewing supplies or recipes. This practice has been widely documented in media and popular commentary and is often referenced humorously as a shared cultural experience.

Royal Dansk has publicly acknowledged the reuse of its tins, stating that the long-term reuse of its tins contributes to its sustainability efforts.

== See also ==
- Decorative box
- Can collecting
- Ground biscuit, ground form of biscuit
- Cookie jar
- Rich tea, an early form of biscuit
- Tea caddy
- Tin box
- Steel and tin cans
