= Malted milk (biscuit) =

Type of biscuit

Malted Milk
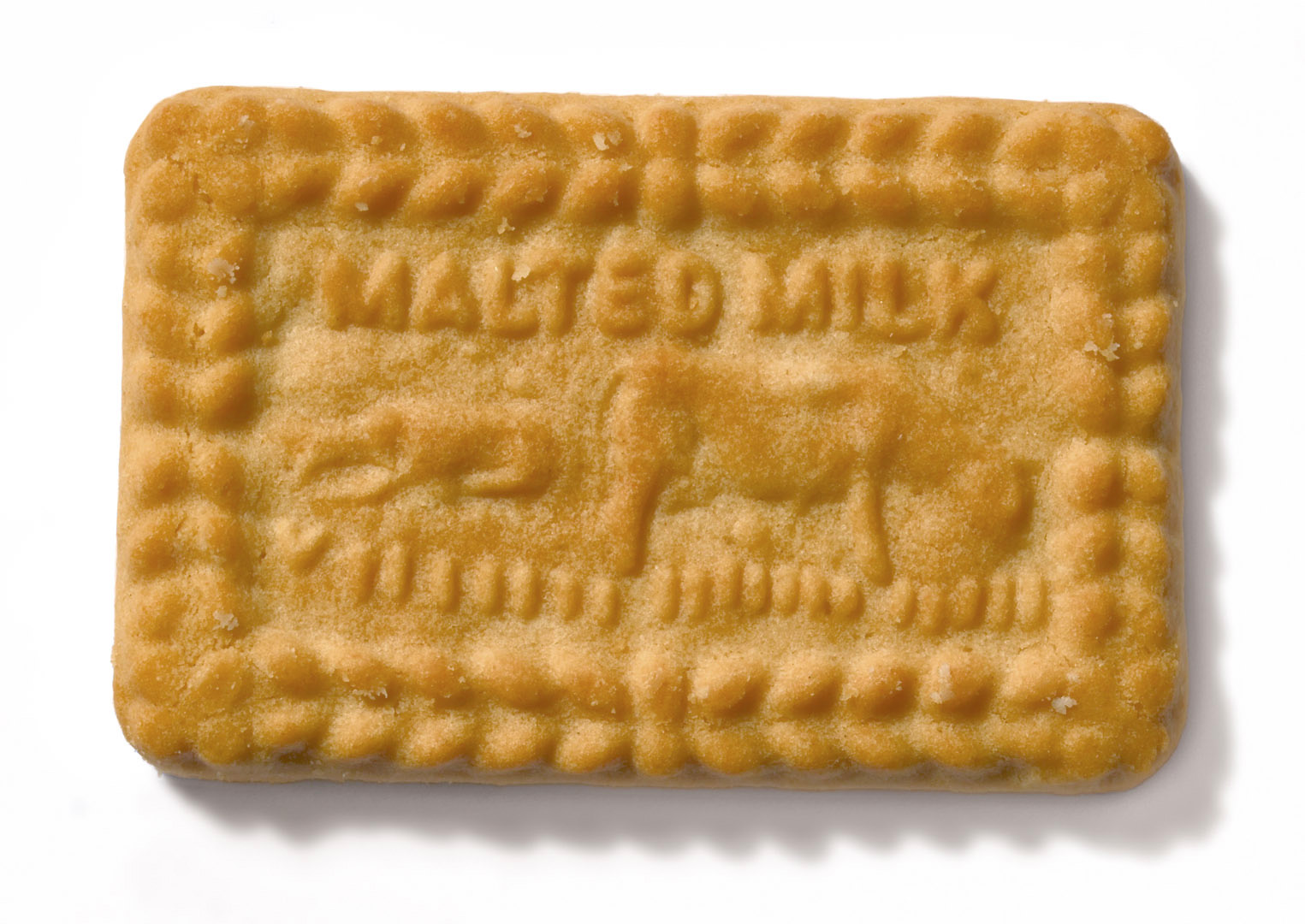
- A typical malted milk biscuit design ("Tesco" brand)
- Type: Biscuit
- Main ingredients: Milk and Malt Flavouring

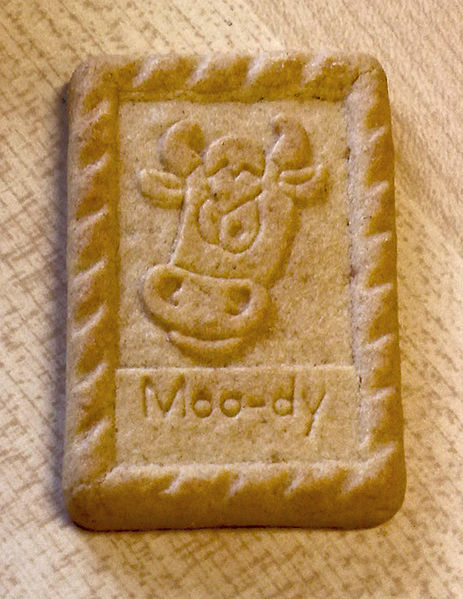
A "moo-dy" malted milk biscuit

Malted Milk is a variety of biscuit, first produced by Elkes Biscuits of Uttoxeter in 1924. They are named after their malt flavouring and milk content.

The biscuit design varies depending on manufacturers; commonly seen designs include two milk churns and a cow. They are typically baked for a short period of time (about 5 minutes) at high temperature to keep them crisp without the use of holes unlike other biscuits such as shortbread.

Variations of the biscuit include a chocolate-covered single biscuit, as well as a custard cream–like variety where two biscuits sandwich a vanilla-based cream.

== See also ==
- Malted milk, the powdered grain and milk product for drinks
- Rich tea, the traditional biscuit that also includes malt but no milk
- Shortbread, the traditional Scottish biscuit that is rich in butter but contains no malt
- List of cookies
