= Ginger snap =

Biscuit with ginger flavor

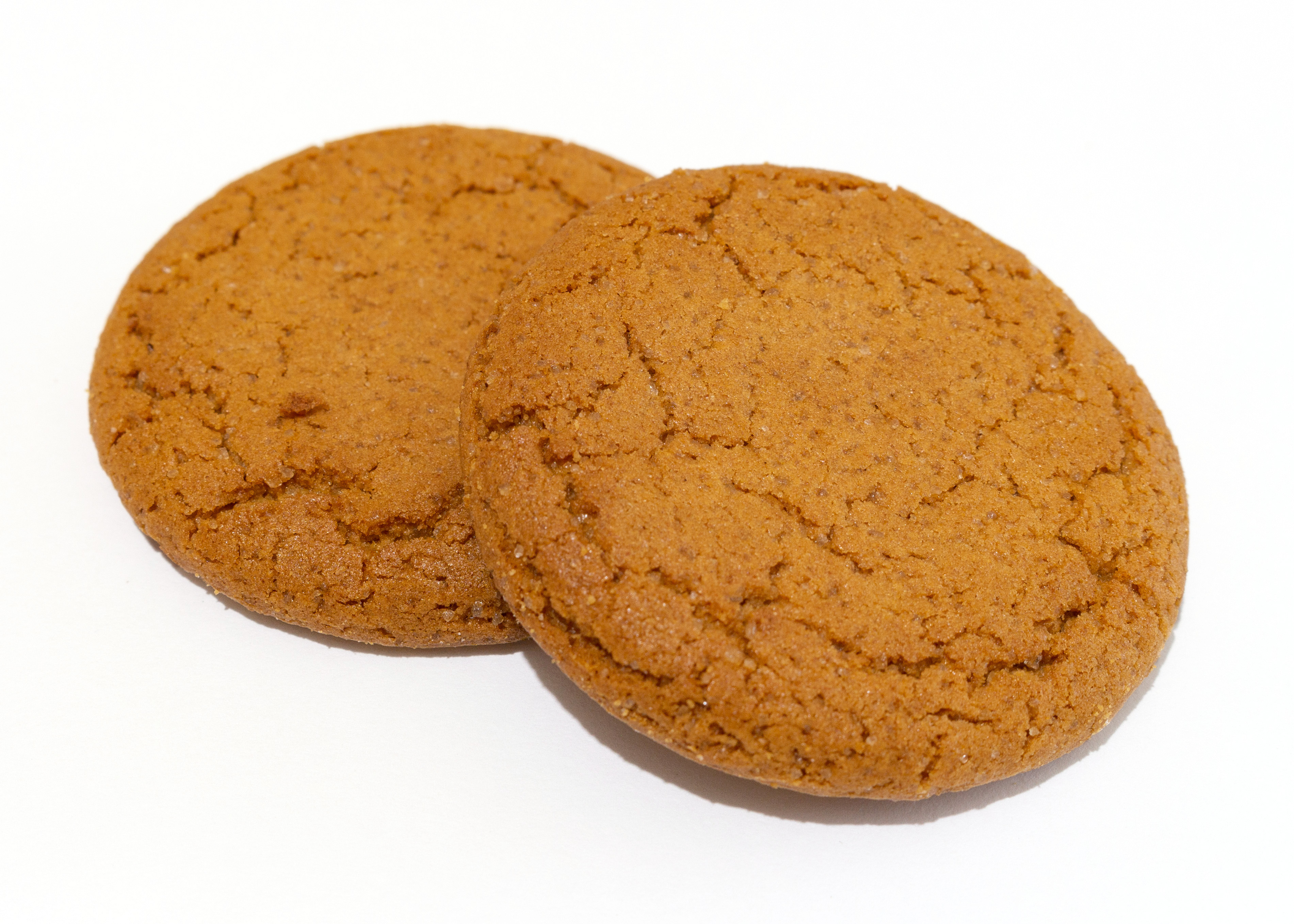
- Ginger nut biscuits made by Arnott's Biscuits
- Alternative names: Ginger nut, ginger biscuit
- Type: Biscuit
- Main ingredients: Powdered ginger, spices (commonly cinnamon and nutmeg)

A gingersnap, ginger snap, ginger nut, or ginger biscuit is a biscuit flavoured with ginger. Ginger snaps are flavoured with powdered ginger and a variety of other spices, most commonly cinnamon, molasses and clove. There are many recipes. The brittle ginger nut style is a commercial version of the traditional fairings once made for market fairs now represented only by the Cornish fairing.

== Global terminology ==
Ginger nuts are not to be confused with pepper nuts, which are a variety of gingerbread, somewhat smaller in diameter, but thicker.

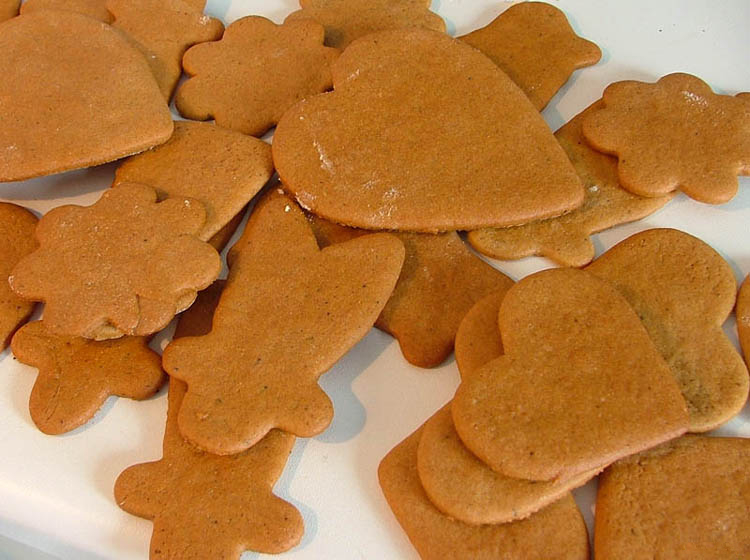
Northern European-style ginger nuts

=== Europe ===
Northern European ginger nuts, also called ginger bread or brunkage in Danish (literally, 'brown cookie'), pepparkakor in Swedish, piparkakut in Finnish, piparkūkas in Latvian, piparkoogid in Estonian and pepperkaker in Norwegian (literally, 'pepper cakes'), are rolled quite thin (often under 3 mm (0.12 in) thick), and cut into shapes; they are smooth and are usually much thinner and hence crisper (and in some cases, more strongly flavoured) than most global varieties. Cloves, cinnamon and cardamom are important ingredients of these, and the actual ginger taste is not prominent. Allspice and cloves have been used to season ginger biscuits.

In 2009, McVitie's Ginger Nuts were listed as the tenth most popular biscuit in the UK to dunk into tea.

=== Oceania ===
In Australia, produced since the 1900s, Arnott's Biscuits manufactures four different regional varieties of ginger nut to suit the tastes of people in different states. The darker and more bitter Queensland biscuit is 8.5 grams (0.30 oz) in weight and average about 6.5 millimetres (0.26 in) in thickness, compared to the lighter South Australia biscuit, which is heavier at 11.7 grams (0.41 oz) in weight, and average about 8.6 millimetres (0.34 in) in thickness.

Ginger nuts are the most sold biscuit in New Zealand, normally attributed to its tough texture which can withstand dunking into liquid. Leading biscuit manufacturer Griffin's estimates 60 million of these cookies are produced each year. This has become the title of a book, 60 Million Gingernuts, a chronicle of New Zealand records.

=== North America ===
In Canada and the United States, the cookies are usually referred to as ginger snaps. Further, they are generally round drop cookies, usually between 1/8 and 1/4 inch (3–6 mm) thick, with noticeable cracks in the top surface.

== See also ==
- Annas Pepparkakor – Swedish cookie company
- Brandy snaps – British snack
- Cornish fairing – British ginger biscuit
- Dunking (biscuit) – Submersion of solid food in liquid
- Gingerbread – Spiced dough used for baking
- Speculaas – Type of biscuit
