= Biscuit =

Sweet baked item

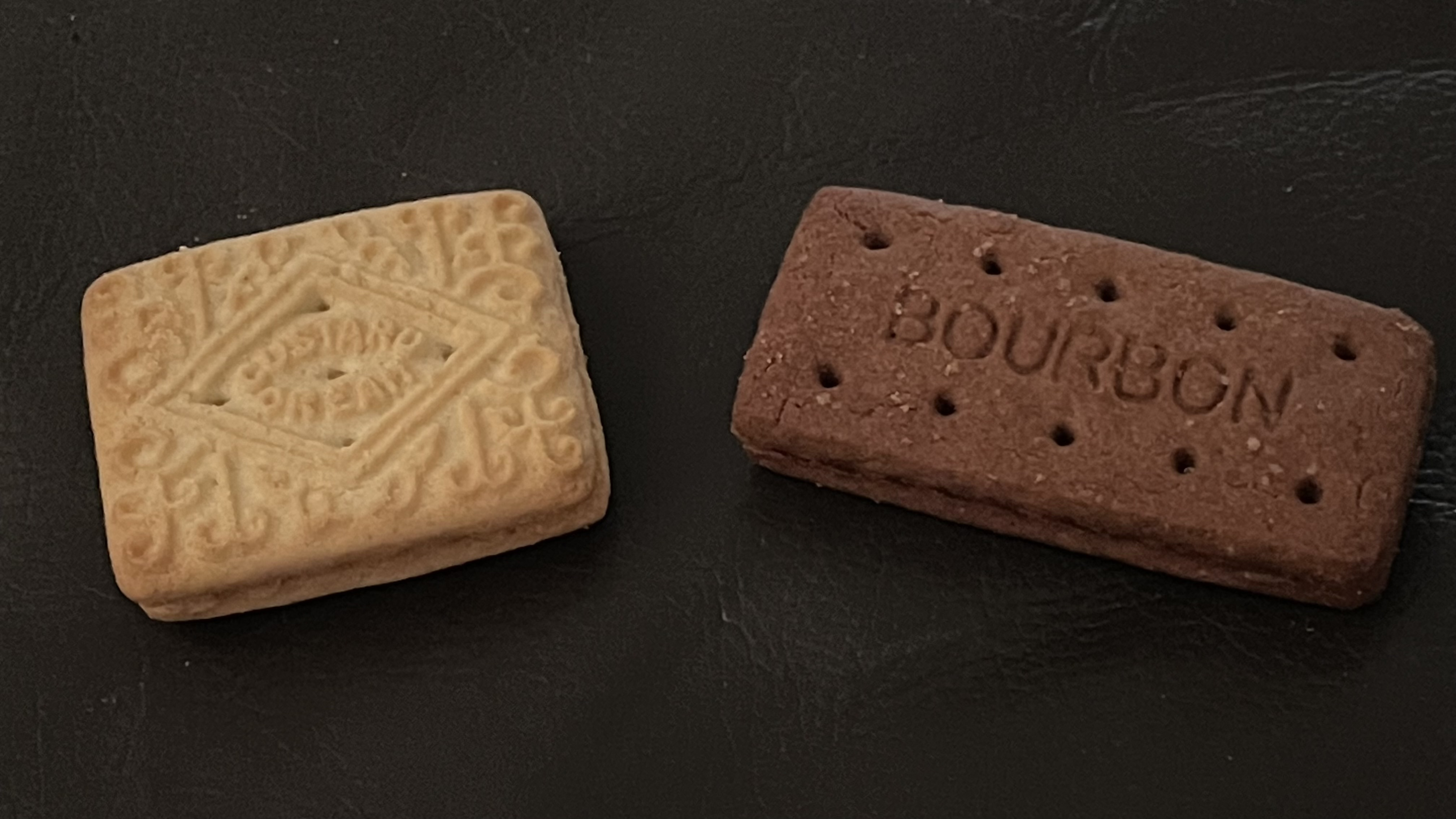
A custard cream and a bourbon biscuit; types of sweet sandwich biscuits

A biscuit is a flour-based baked food item. Biscuits are typically hard, flat, and unleavened. They are usually sweet and may be made with sugar, chocolate, icing, jam, ginger, or cinnamon. Savoury biscuits are called crackers or biscuits for cheese.

Types of biscuit include biscotti, sandwich biscuits (such as custard creams), digestive biscuits, ginger biscuits, shortbread biscuits, chocolate chip cookies, Anzac biscuits, and speculaas.

The term biscuit is used in many English-speaking countries. In the United States and parts of Canada, sweet biscuits are nearly always called cookies while flat savoury biscuits are called crackers and the term biscuit is used to refer to a type of quick bread.

== Name ==
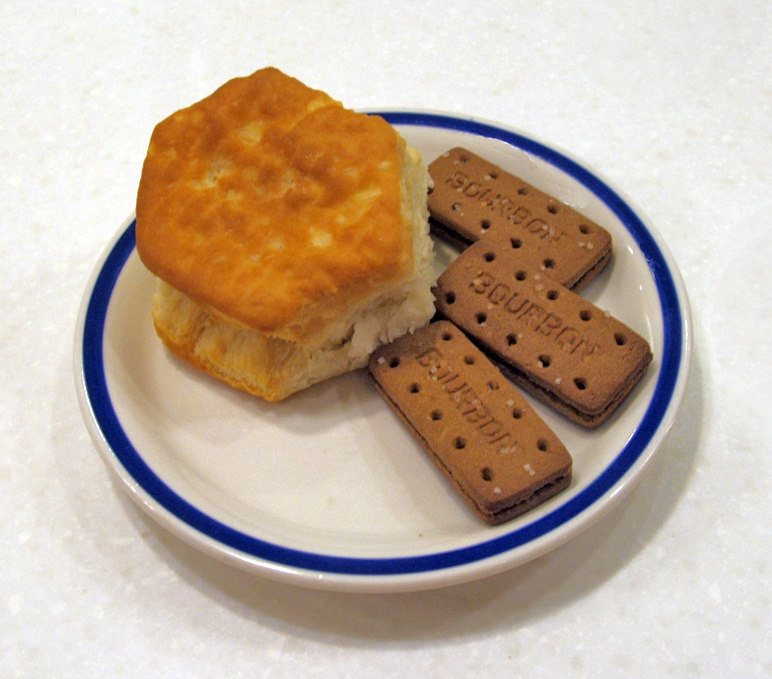
North American biscuit (left) and British biscuits of the bourbon variety (right). The North American biscuit is soft and flaky like a scone, whereas the British biscuits are smaller, drier, sweeter, and crunchy like cookies.

Small, hard, flour-based baked products are known in many English-speaking countries as biscuits. In the United States and sometimes Canada, this word refers to a quick bread that is like a scone, but with a fluffier texture (see biscuit (bread)), and what are known as biscuits in other English-speaking countries are called either a cookie or a cracker. Canadians sometimes distinguish the quick bread with the name "tea biscuit". In the United Kingdom, the Isle of Man and Ireland, cookie refers to a single type of biscuit: the sweeter baked dough typically containing chocolate chips or raisins. In Scotland, cookie is also used to refer to some specific types of biscuits or breads. Historically in the United Kingdom, quick breads were known as biscuits. This practice has ended in England, although it has remained in Scotland and Guernsey.

The word biscuit comes from the Old French word bescuit, which was derived from the Latin words bis ('twice') and coquere, coctus ('to cook', 'cooked'), and, hence, means 'twice-cooked'. (Note: See, for example, Shakespeare's use of "Twice-sod simplicity! Bis coctus!" in Love's Labour's Lost. (David Crystal; Ben Crystal (eds.). "Love's Labour's Lost". Shakespeare's Words. Penguin Books. Archived from the original on 15 March 2017.)) This is because biscuits were originally cooked in a twofold process: first baked, and then dried out in a slow oven.

== History ==
=== Biscuits for travel ===
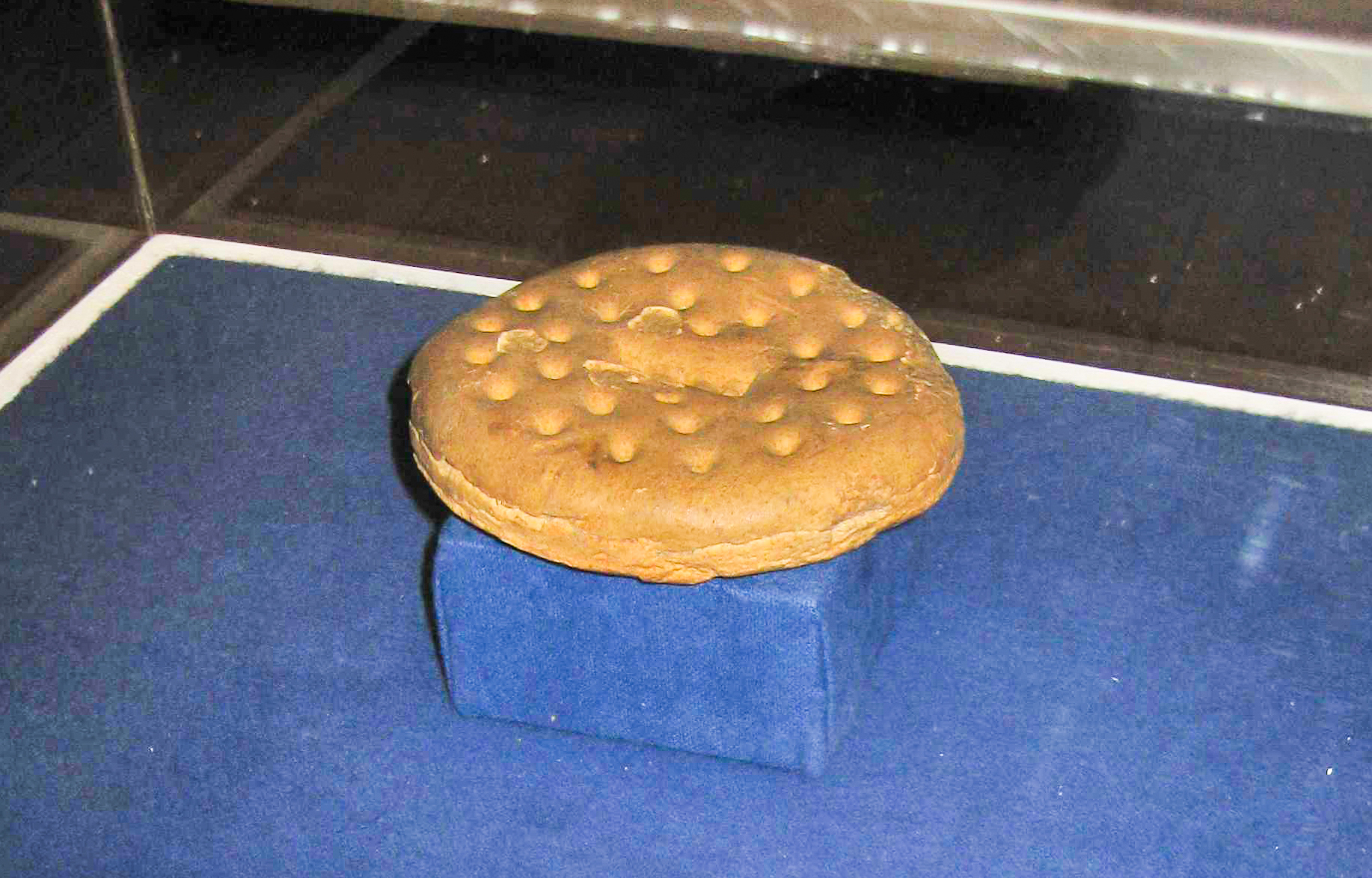
Ship's biscuit from c. 1852 on display in Kronborg, Denmark

The need for nutritious, easy-to-store, easy-to-carry, and long-lasting foods on long journeys, in particular at sea, was initially solved by taking livestock along with a butcher/cook. However, this took up additional space on what were either horse-powered treks or small ships, reducing the time of travel before additional food was required. This resulted in early armies' adopting the style of hunter-foraging.

The introduction of the baking of processed cereals, including the creation of flour, provided a more reliable source of food. Egyptian sailors carried a flat, brittle loaf of millet bread called dhourra cake while the Romans had a biscuit called buccellum. Roman cookbook Apicius describes: "a thick paste of fine wheat flour was boiled and spread out on a plate. When it had dried and hardened, it was cut up and then fried until crisp, then served with honey and pepper."

Many early physicians believed that most medicinal problems were associated with digestion. Hence, for both sustenance and avoidance of illness, a daily consumption of a biscuit was considered good for health.

Hard biscuits soften as they age. To solve this problem, early bakers attempted to create the hardest biscuit possible. Because it is so hard and dry, if properly stored and transported, navies' hardtack will survive rough handling and high temperature. Baked hard, it can be kept without spoiling for years as long as it is kept dry. For long voyages, hardtack was baked four times, rather than the more common two. To soften hardtack for eating, it was often dunked in brine, coffee, or some other liquid or cooked into a skillet meal.

The collection Sayings of the Desert Fathers mentions that Anthony the Great (who lived in the 4th century AD) ate biscuits and the text implies that it was a popular food among monks of the time and region.

At the time of the Spanish Armada in 1588, the daily allowance on board a Royal Navy ship was one pound of biscuit plus one gallon of beer. Samuel Pepys in 1667 first regularised naval victualling with varied and nutritious rations. Royal Navy hardtack during Queen Victoria's reign was made by machine at the Royal Clarence Victualling Yard at Gosport, Hampshire, stamped with the Queen's mark and the number of the oven in which they were baked. When machinery was introduced into the process the dough was thoroughly mixed and rolled into sheets about 2 yards (1.8 m) long and 1 yard (0.9 m) wide which were stamped in one stroke into about sixty hexagonal-shaped biscuits. This left the sheets sufficiently coherent to be placed in the oven in one piece and when baked they were easy to separate. The hexagonal shape rather than traditional circular biscuits meant a saving in material and was easier to pack. Biscuits remained an important part of the Royal Navy sailor's diet until the introduction of canned foods. Canned meat was first marketed in 1814; preserved beef in tins was officially added to Royal Navy rations in 1847.

=== Confectionery biscuits ===
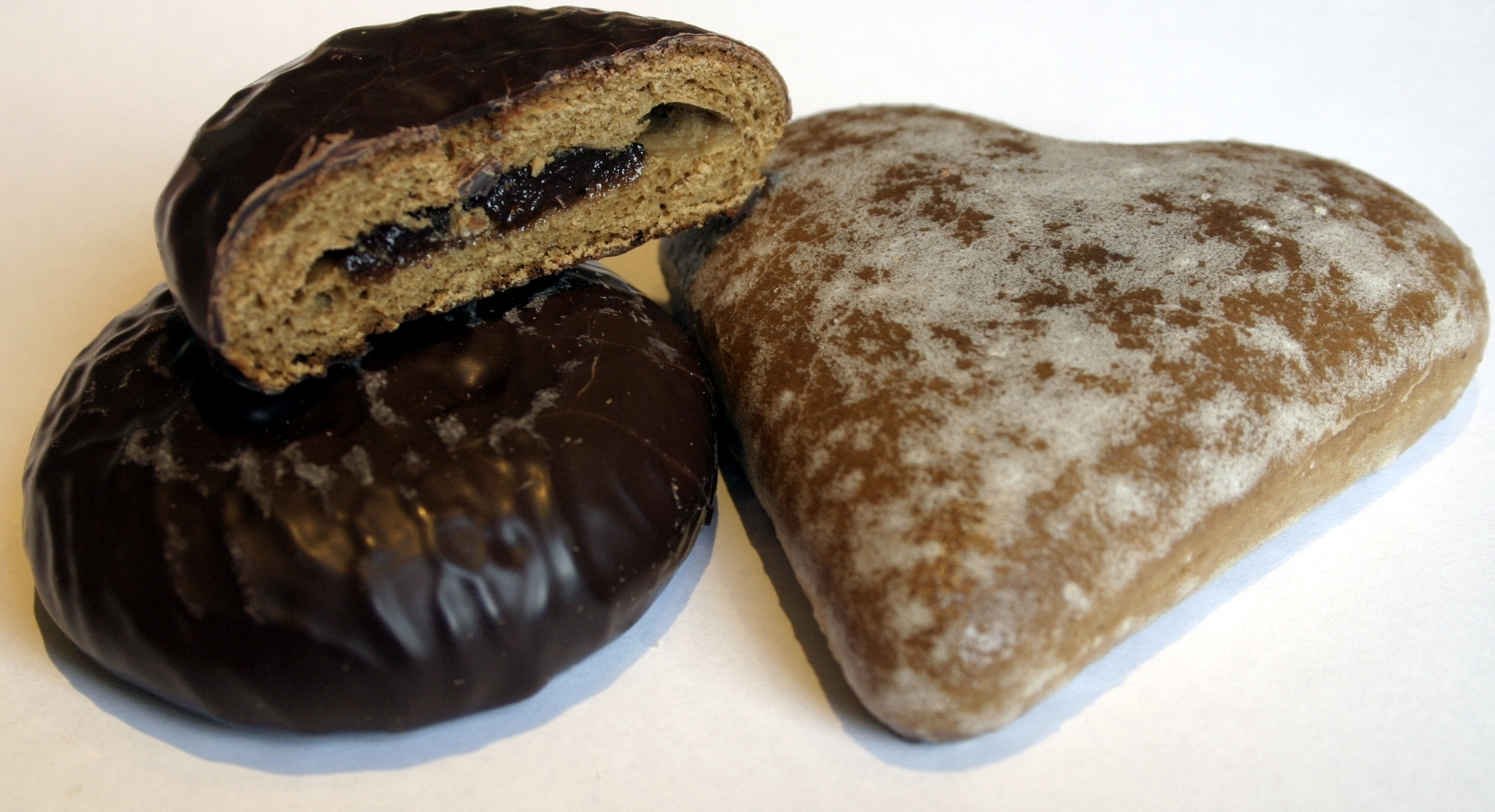
Traditional Polish Toruń gingerbread pierniki toruńskie

Early biscuits were hard, dry, and unsweetened. They were most often cooked after bread, in a cooling bakers' oven; they were a cheap form of sustenance for the poor.

By the 7th century AD, cooks of the Sassanian Empire had learnt from their forebears the techniques of lightening and enriching bread-based mixtures with eggs, butter, and cream, and sweetening them with fruit and honey. One of the earliest spiced biscuits was gingerbread, in French, pain d'épices, meaning "spice bread", brought to Europe in 992 by the Armenian monk Grégoire de Nicopolis. He left Nicopolis Pompeii, of Lesser Armenia to live in Bondaroy, France, near the town of Pithiviers. He stayed there for seven years and taught French priests and Christians how to cook gingerbread. This was originally a dense, treaclely (molasses-based) spice cake or bread. As it was so expensive to make, early ginger biscuits were a cheap form of using up the leftover bread mix.

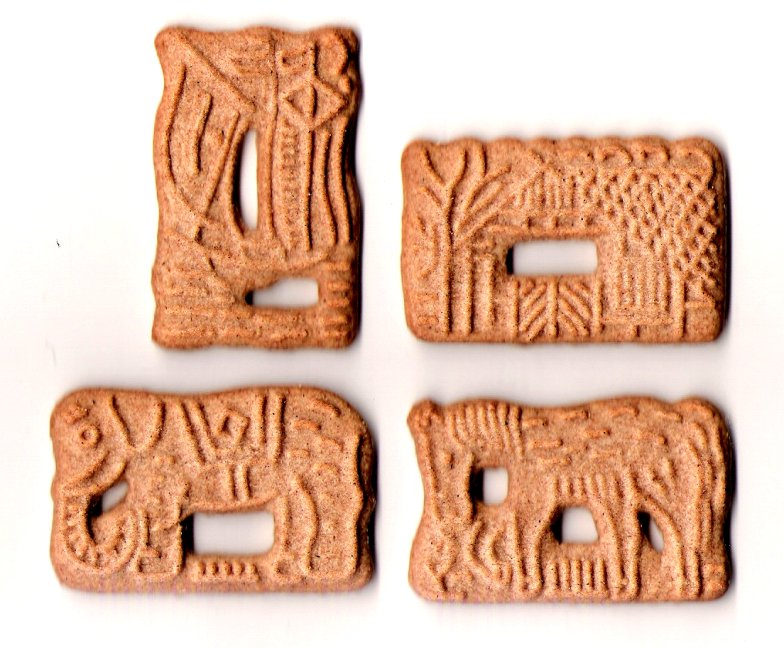
Dutch speculaas biscuits in various shapes: ship, farmhouse, elephant, horse

With the combination of knowledge spreading from Al-Andalus, and then the Crusades and subsequent spread of the spice trade to Europe, the cooking techniques and ingredients of Arabia spread into Northern Europe. By mediaeval times, biscuits were made from a sweetened, spiced paste of breadcrumbs and then baked (e.g., gingerbread), or from cooked bread enriched with sugar and spices and then baked again. King Richard I of England (aka Richard the Lionheart) left for the Third Crusade (1189–92) with "biskit of muslin", which was a mixed corn compound of barley, rye, and bean flour.

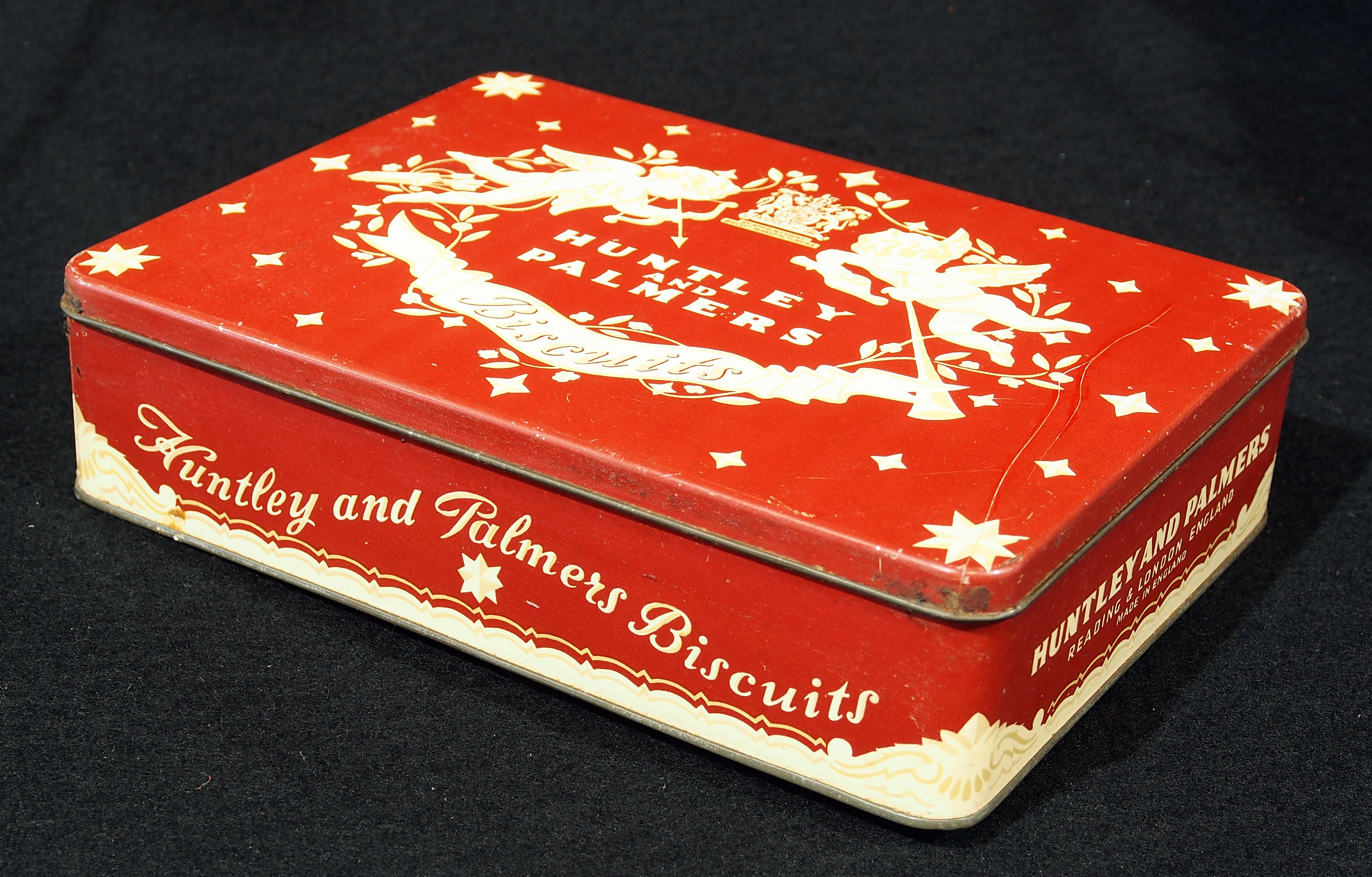
Huntley & Palmers biscuit tin. Formed in Reading, Berkshire, in 1822, the biscuit company became one of the world's first global brands.

As the making and quality of bread had been controlled to this point, so were the skills of biscuit-making through the craft guilds. As the supply of sugar began, and the refinement and supply of flour increased, so did the ability to sample more leisurely foodstuffs, including sweet biscuits. Early references from the Vadstena monastery show how the Swedish nuns were baking gingerbread to ease digestion in 1444.

The first documented trade of gingerbread biscuits dates to the 16th century, where they were sold in monastery pharmacies and town square farmers markets. Gingerbread became widely available in the 18th century. The Industrial Revolution in Britain sparked the formation of businesses in various industries, and the British biscuit firms of McVitie's, Carr's, Huntley & Palmers, and Crawfords were all established by 1850.

Chocolate and biscuits became products for the masses, thanks to the Industrial Revolution and the consumers it created. By the mid-19th century, sweet biscuits were an affordable indulgence and business was booming. Manufacturers such as Huntley & Palmers in Reading, Carr's of Carlisle and McVitie's in Edinburgh transformed from small family-run businesses into state-of-the-art operations.

— Polly Russell in the Financial Times, 2018.

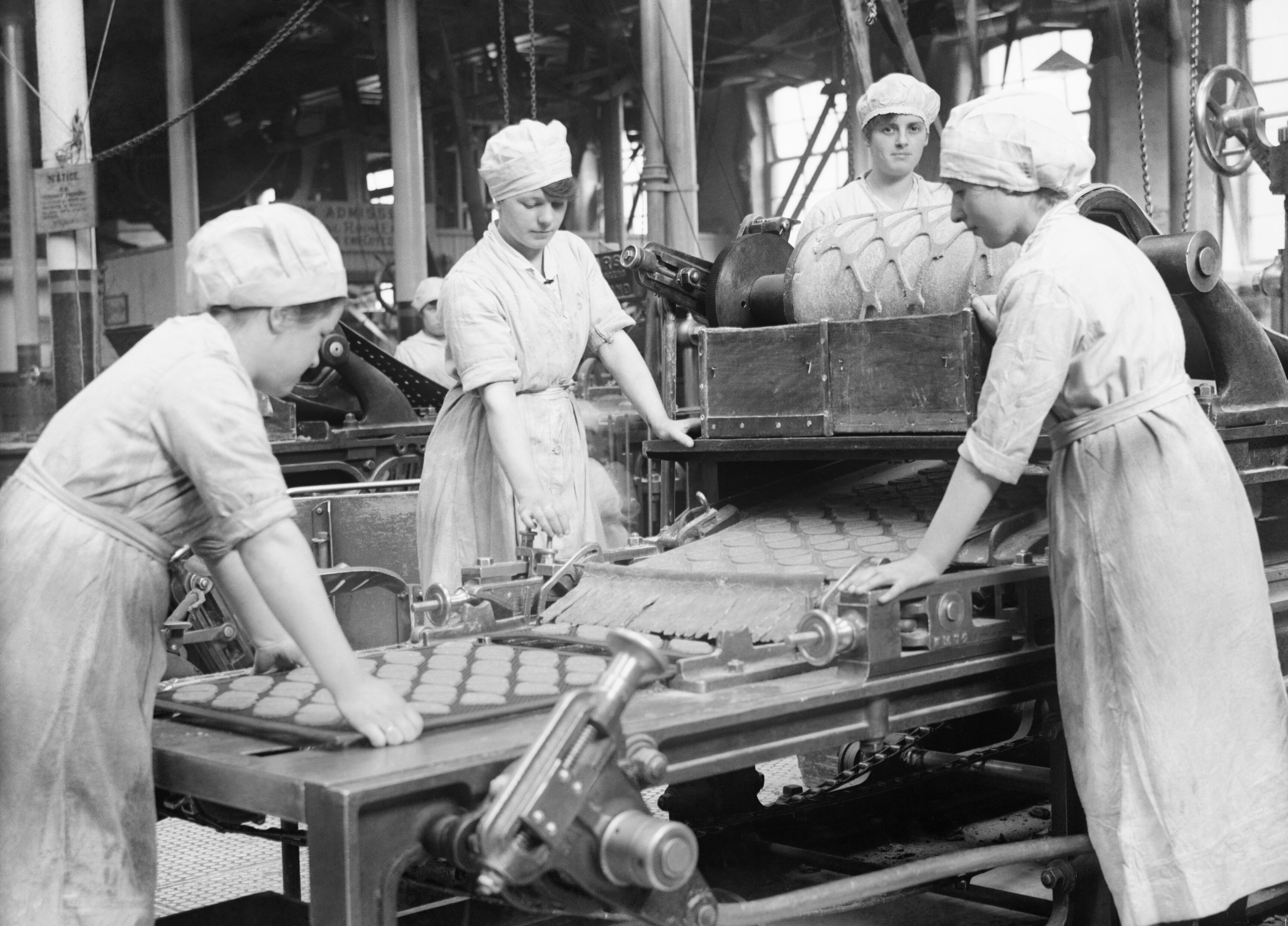
A British biscuit factory in 1918

British biscuit companies vied to dominate the market with new products and eye-catching packaging. The decorative biscuit tin, invented by Huntley & Palmers in 1831, saw British biscuits exported around the world. In 1900 Huntley & Palmers biscuits were sold in 172 countries, and their global reach was reflected in their advertising. Competition and innovation among British firms saw 49 patent applications for biscuit-making equipment, tins, dough-cutting machines and ornamental moulds between 1897 and 1900. In 1891, Cadbury filed a patent for a chocolate-coated biscuit. In 1892, McVitie's manufactured digestive biscuits to a secret recipe developed by Alexander Grant, then a young employee of the company before he became the managing director. McVitie's created the chocolate digestive in 1925. Along with local farm produce of meat and cheese, many regions of the world have their own distinct style of biscuit due to the historic prominence of this form of food. The Scots, for example, created shortbread, and in 1898 the Scottish manufacturer Walker's Shortbread was founded.

=== Introduction in South Asia ===
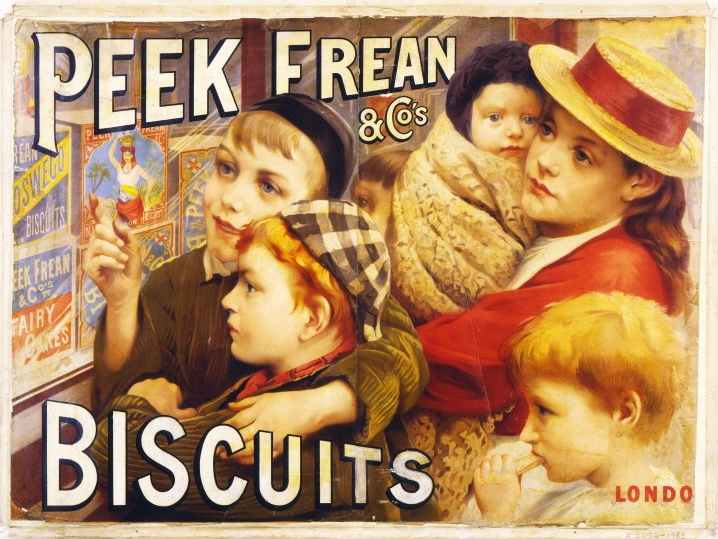
1891 advertisement in London for Peek Freans, a brand exported to Asia

Biscuits and loaves were introduced in Bengal during the British colonial period and became popular within the Sylheti Muslim community. However, the middle-class Hindus of Cachar and Sylhet were very suspicious of biscuits and breads as they believed they were baked by Muslims. On one occasion, a few Hindus in Cachar caught an English educated Hindu eating biscuits with tea, which caused an uproar. The information reached the Hindus of Sylhet and a small rebellion occurred. In response to this, companies started to advertise their bread as "machine-made" and "untouched by (Muslim) hand" to tell Hindus that the breads were "safe for consumption". This incident is mentioned in Bipin Chandra Pal's autobiography and he mentions how culinary habits of Hindus gradually changed and biscuits and loaves eventually became increasingly popular.

== Types ==
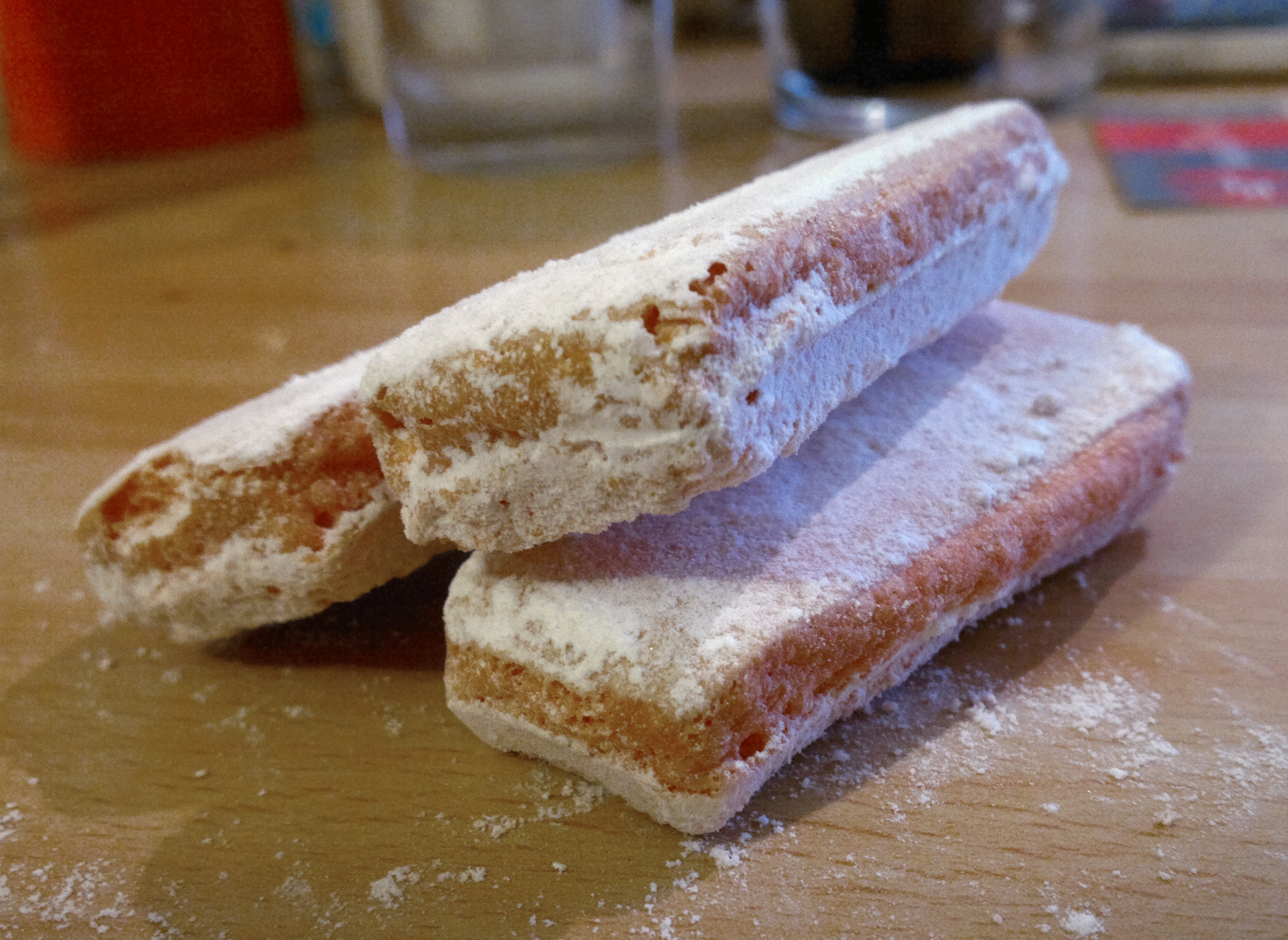
Biscuit rose de Reims

Biscuits can be divided into four categories, separated by their process and ingredients:

=== Crackers ===
Crackers are savoury biscuits with a "crispy, open texture". They include biscuits such as cream crackers, "Ritz-type" crackers, saltines, snack crackers (e.g. Arnott's Shapes) and water biscuits. Cracker doughs often have some of the following features: they are leavened, have a water content between 15 and 25%, are laminated and rise during the first part of baking.

In a general process to make crackers, dough is mixed and fermented. It is fed through a dough feed conveyor to be laminated, sheeted and cut. It is baked, sprayed with oil and cooled, before finally being packed. Baking surfaces differ by the country biscuits are baked in: traditional British biscuits being baked on light wire mesh, while American biscuits are baked on heavy mesh. The baking process requires high amounts of energy to get the relatively high hydration doughs to a final biscuit that is 1.5–2.5% water.

=== Semi-sweet ===
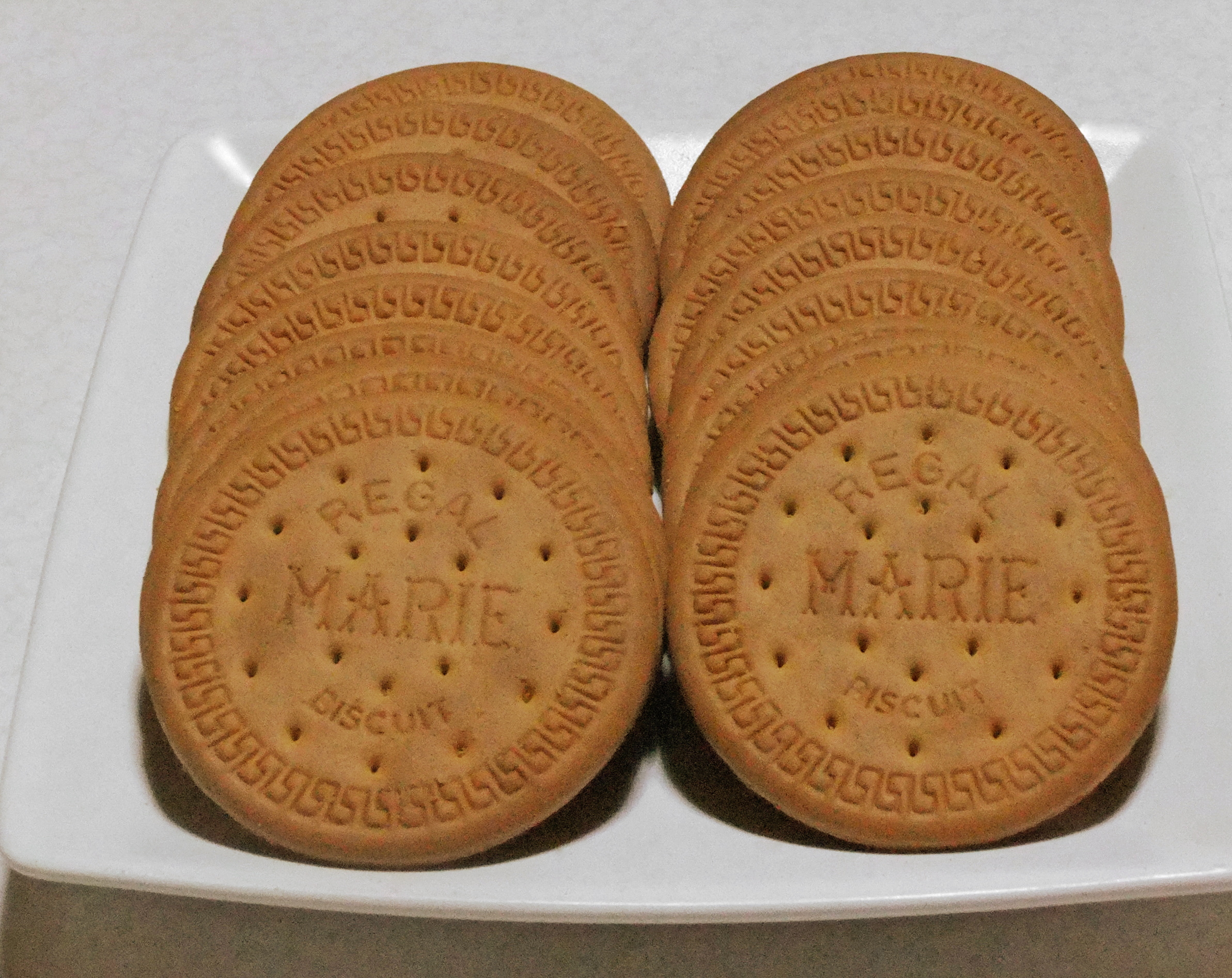
Marie biscuits

Semi-sweet biscuits are distinguished by a their consistent texture and colour. This consistency, and a voluminous appearance are a product primarily of the presence of humidity during the first part of baking. Examples of semi-sweet biscuits include Arrowroot, Belvita, Marie, Petit-Beurre and Rich tea. The doughs of semi-sweet biscuits have strong gluten, making it shrink during baking. They have low sugar and fat contents, and their water content, about 12%, is reduced to 1.5–3% through the baking process. In making semi-sweet biscuits, the dough is mixed, fed, undergoes sheeting and is cut and baked. The biscuits are cooled before they are processed through stacking and/or packing.

=== Short doughs ===
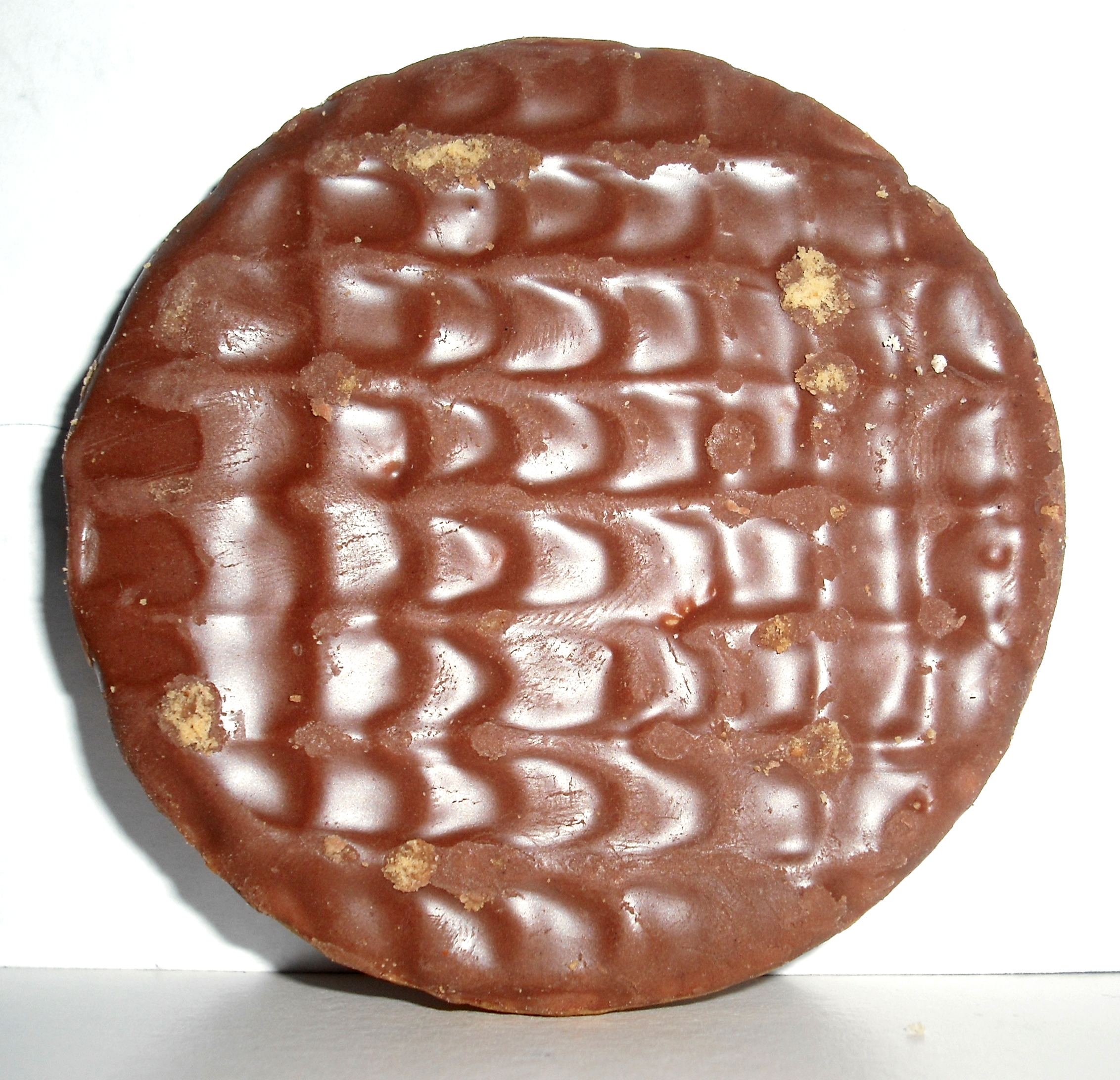
The milk chocolate coated side of a McVitie's chocolate digestive. It is routinely ranked the UK's favourite snack.

Biscuits contain relatively high amounts of sugar and fat. The category covers many regional specialties, including the British custard cream and digestives, the Dutch speculaas, the Indian glucose biscuit and the Scottish shortbread. It also covers more generic biscuits of Lincoln and malted milk. Short biscuits are the simplest biscuits to make, which has led to them being widely produced in great volumes. They are frequently fortified. Short dough biscuits have a relatively low water content, and are cooked slower, and at low temperatures than crackers and semi-sweet biscuits.

Short doughs are produced through a two-stage mixing process. The dough is stood, fed and undergoes rotary moulding, the step by which short biscuits derive their alternative name of rotary moulded biscuits. They are baked, cooled and stacked and packed. The structure is derived from a high humidity during early stages of baking.

=== Cookies ===
The widest category, cookies have very soft doughs. They are often baked directly on a steel oven band. Cookies have high sugar and fat contents, and are cooked longer than other biscuits at relatively low temperatures. Through the presence of humidity during the first stage of cooking, cookies spread as they are baked. Many cookies contain inclusions, such as nuts, chocolate chips (chocolate chip cookie) and fruits (e.g. raisins and figs in fig rolls). They include butter cookies, extruded cookies and cookies with their centres filled.

Cookies are produced through mixing a dough in two stages. The dough is baked on a steel oven band. It is then cooled and finally stacked and/or packed.

== Culture ==
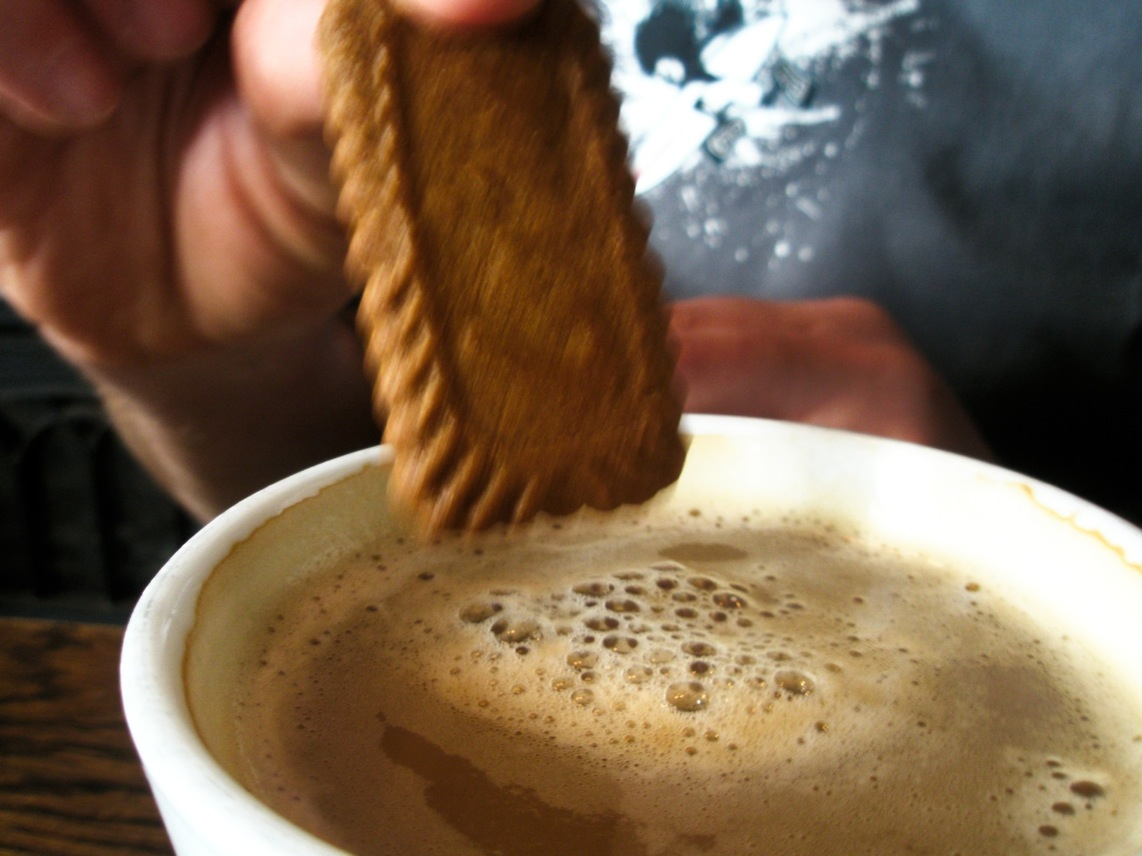
Dunking a biscuit

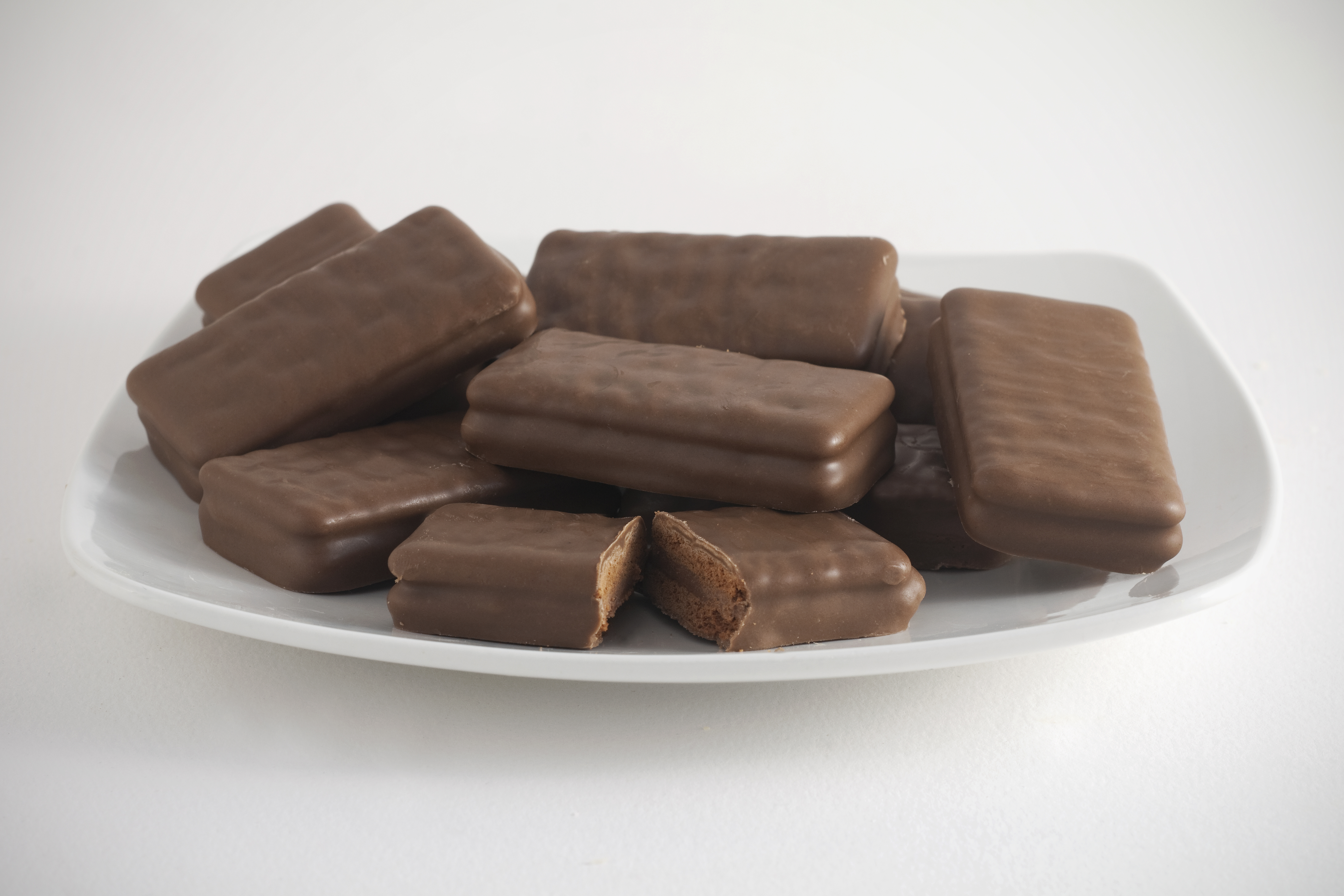
Milk chocolate Tim Tams, a biscuit created in Australia in 1964

Biscuits are eaten worldwide by people from many cultures.

In British culture, the digestive biscuit and rich tea biscuit are the traditional accompaniment to a cup of tea and are regularly eaten as such. Some tea drinkers dunk biscuits in tea, allowing them to absorb liquid and soften slightly before consumption. Chocolate digestives, rich tea, and Hobnobs were ranked the UK's top three favourite dunking biscuits in 2009. In a non-dunking poll the Chocolate Hobnob was ranked first with custard creams coming third.

== Industry ==
Brands in the European biscuit market are unusually old for the food and drink industry, with the main brands as of 2016 being on average 100 years old. Historically in these companies, the owners and top-level managers were heavily involved in brand management.

== See also ==
Media related to Biscuits at Wikimedia Commons

- American and British English differences
- Biscuit tin
- Dog biscuit
- Ghorayeba
- Ground biscuit
- Ka'ak
- List of baked goods
- List of biscuits and cookies
- List of shortbread biscuits and cookies
- Rusk
- Take the biscuit idiom
- Biscotti, biscotti regina
