= Dunking (biscuit) =

Submersion of solid food in liquid

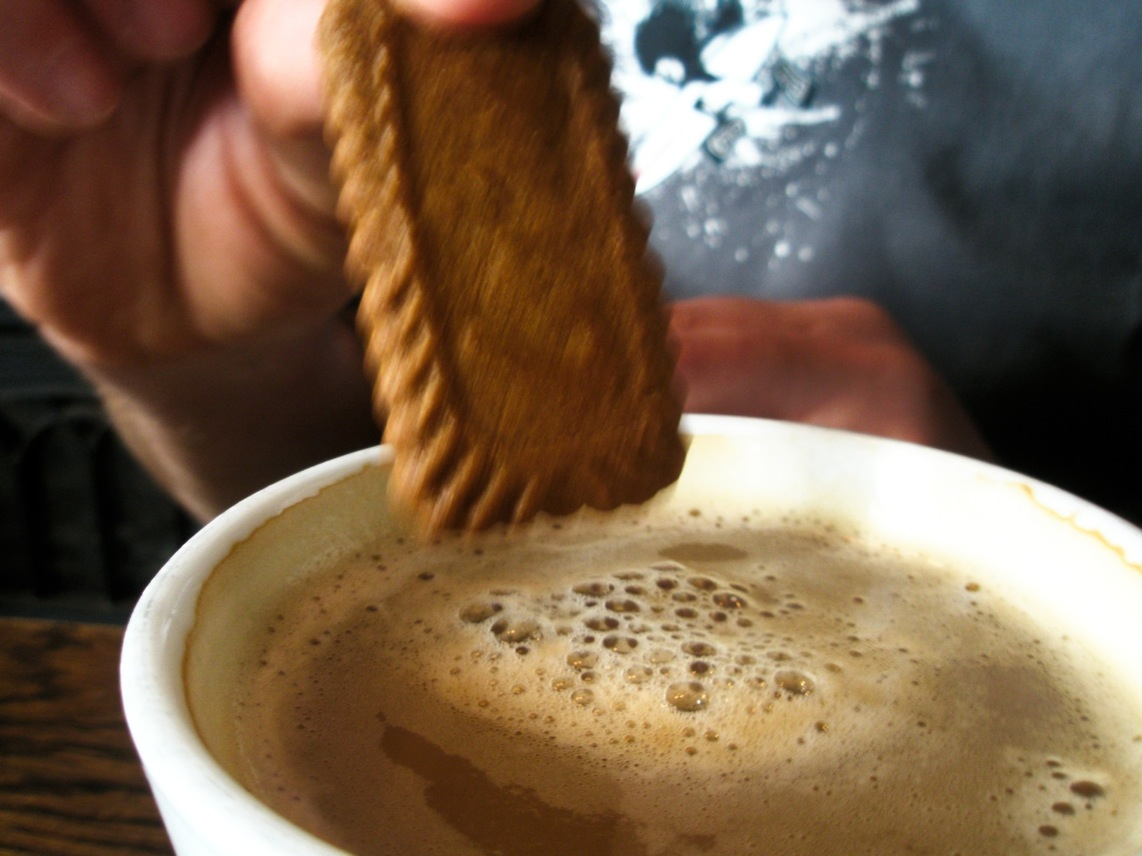
Dunking a Lotus Biscoff biscuit

To dunk or to dip a biscuit or some other food, usually baked goods, means to partially submerge it into a drink - especially tea, coffee, or milk - before eating it. Dunking releases more flavour from confections by dissolving the sugars, while also softening their texture. Dunking can be used to melt chocolate on biscuits to create a richer flavour.

Dunking is a popular way of enjoying biscuits in many countries. A popular form of dunking in Australia is the "Tim Tam Slam", also known as 'tea sucking'. The physics of dunking is driven by the porosity of the biscuit and the surface tension of the beverage. A biscuit is porous and, when dunked, capillary action draws the liquid into the interstices between the crumbs.

Dunking is first reported with ancient Romans softening their hard unleavened wafers (Latin: bis coctum – "twice baked") in wine. Modern day dunking has its roots in naval history when, in the 16th century, biscuits known as "hard tack" were on board Royal Navy ships, which were so hard that the British sailors would dunk them in beer in order to soften them up. The most popular biscuit to dunk in tea in the United Kingdom is McVitie's chocolate digestive. In the US, Oreos are frequently dunked in milk, while the Dunkin' Donuts franchise is named for the practice of dunking doughnuts into coffee. In South Africa and in India, rusks are a popular food for dunking in both tea and coffee. In the Netherlands, stroopwafels are commonly dunked in tea or coffee, often after having been set on above the hot drink for a few minutes to melt the caramel inside. In Nigeria, bread is commonly dunked in tea or hot chocolate, while Acarajé is dunked in pap. In Australia and New Zealand gingernut biscuits are commonly dunked in tea or coffee, most commonly Arnotts brand Ginger Nuts. In Italy, Biscotti are almond biscuits traditionally served with a drink into which they may be dunked. They are twice-baked, which makes them very hard and dry so dunking helps soften the biscuit up.

Dunking is also used as a slang term for intinction: the Eucharistic practice of partly dipping the consecrated bread, or host, into the consecrated wine, by the officiant before distributing.

== Etiquette and style ==
While modern day dunking has its origins in 16th century naval history, it was not until the 19th century and the emergence of afternoon tea in the early Victorian era that Great Britain began to regard biscuits as something to be dunked in tea, a British custom that was later exported around the globe. Different cultures have different attitudes toward biscuit dunking. Historically in British high society, dunking was frowned upon and generally seen as children's or working class fashion. However, Queen Victoria herself was said to enjoy dunking her biscuits, a German custom from her younger days. In 2007, a tea room in Brighton, England, banned dunking on its premises.

In the United States, the act took on a marketing purpose for doughnut sellers in the 1930s. They formed the National Dunking Association, which prompted members to follow "rules for dunking" and used the association to market their products.

== Science ==
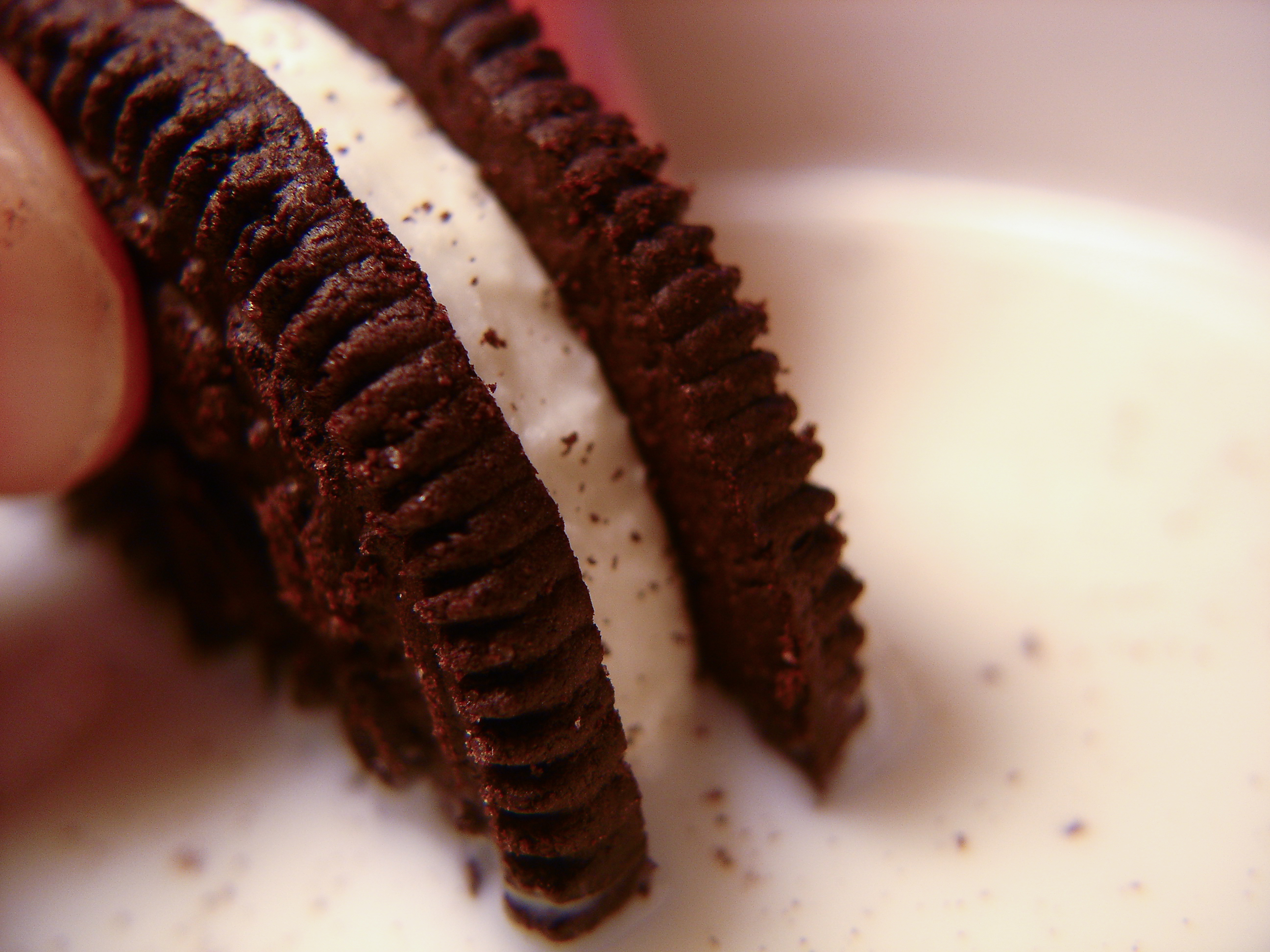
An Oreo cookie dunked into milk.

Physicist Len Fisher of the University of Bristol presented some light-hearted discussion of dunking on "National Biscuit Dunking Day" in the UK, as part of an attempt to make physics accessible. Fisher appeared to be somewhat taken aback by the large amount of media attention, ascribing it to a "hunger for accessible science". Fisher also described his astonishment at journalists' interest in one equation used in the field: Washburn's equation, which describes capillary flow in porous materials. Writing in Nature, he says "the equation was published in almost every major UK newspaper. The journalists who published it took great care to get it right, some telephoning several times to check". Fisher was awarded an Ig Nobel Prize for Physics, in 1999, for his research into biscuit dunking.

In 2012, Michelin-starred English restaurateur Heston Blumenthal researched the effect of dunking chocolate biscuits, and concluded that it improved the biscuit's taste. "If you have chocolate on one side, if it melts a bit, you get a velvety smooth texture and then the delicious flavour as a result."

In 2022, a comparative study concluded that a hobnob style biscuit maintains its integrity for the longest after being dunked in a hot drink.

== See also ==
- Dipping sauce
- Sop
