= Digestive biscuit =

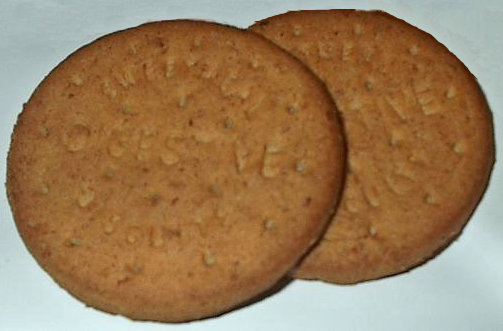
- Alternative names: Wheaten, sweet-meal biscuit
- Type: Biscuit
- Place of origin: Scotland
- Region or state: Forres
- Associated cuisine: British
- Invented: 1839
- Main ingredients: Wheat flour, sugar, malt extract, butter (or in cheaper recipes or for vegans or those who are lactose intolerant: vegetable oil), wholemeal, leavening agents (usually sodium bicarbonate, tartaric acid and malic acid), salt

A digestive biscuit, sometimes described as a sweet-meal biscuit, is a semi-sweet biscuit that originated in Scotland. The digestive was first developed in 1839 by two doctors to aid digestion. The term digestive is derived from the belief, around the time the biscuit was first introduced, that they had antacid properties due to the use of sodium bicarbonate as an ingredient. Historically, some producers used diastatic malt extract to "digest" some of the starch that existed in flour prior to baking.

First manufactured by McVitie's in 1892 to a secret recipe developed by Sir Alexander Grant, their digestive is the best-selling biscuit in the United Kingdom. In 2009, the digestive was ranked the fourth most popular biscuit for "dunking" into tea among the British public, with the chocolate digestive (produced by McVitie's since 1925) coming in at number one. The chocolate variant from McVitie's is routinely ranked the UK's favourite snack.

== History ==
In 1839, digestives were developed in the United Kingdom by two Scottish doctors to aid digestion. In an 1851 issue of The Lancet, London's advertising section offered brown meal digestive biscuits. At the time, it was asserted that grain millers knew only of bran and endosperm. After 10% of the whole grain's coarser outer-bran coat was removed, and because the innermost 70% of pure endosperm was reserved for other uses, brown meal, representing only 20% of the whole grain, remained, consisting of about 15% fine bran and 85% white flour. By 1912, it was more widely known that brown meal included the germ, which lent a characteristic sweetness.

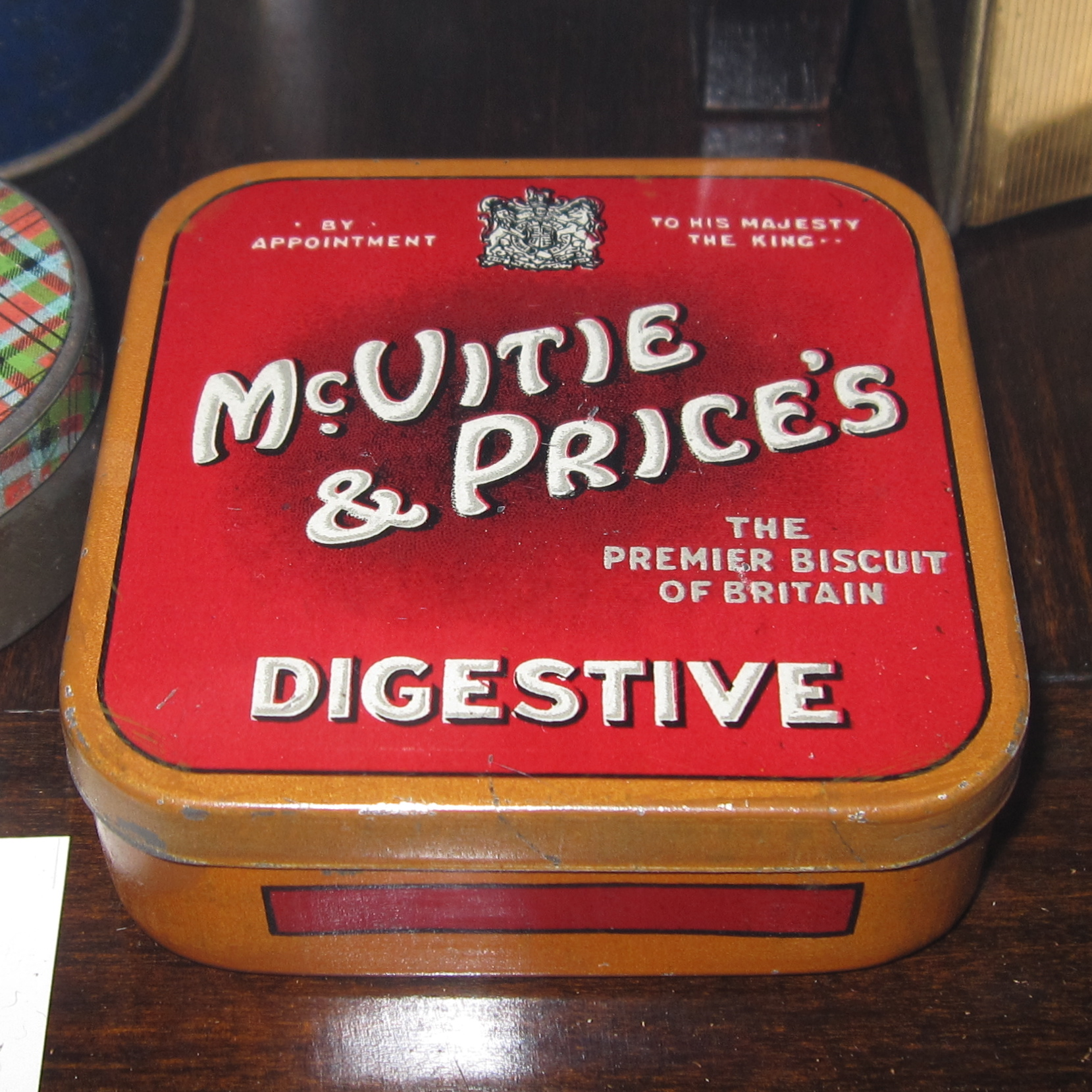
Early 20th century McVitie & Price's Digestive tin box, located in the Victoria and Albert Museum, London

Digestives were featured in advertisements for the Berkshire-based biscuit company Huntley & Palmers in 1876, with digestives sold by chemists alongside indigestion powder. Rival biscuit company, Edinburgh-based McVitie's, has golden-baked their best-selling digestives to a secret recipe developed by Sir Alexander Grant since 1892.

The grandfather of the British biscuit, McVitie’s Digestive [...] with a secret recipe to rival KFC's special spice mix and a history richer than a Rich Tea [...] the humble digestive biscuit went from being a Victorian health food to the nation's most recognisable teatime treat. The biscuit of McVitie's fame was invented in 1892 by Scottish baker Alexander Grant.

— The Telegraph on Grant's recipe for digestives.

A recipe was given in Cassell's New Universal Cookery Book of 1894. In 1889, John Montgomerie of Scotland filed a U.S. patent application, which was granted in 1890. This patent asserted a prior patent existed in England dated to 1886. The U.S. patent, titled Making Malted Bread, included instructions for the manufacture of digestive biscuits. Montgomerie claimed this saccharification process would make "nourishing food for people of weak digestion". Despite rumours that it is illegal for them to be sold under their usual name in the US, they are, in fact, widely available in the imported food sections of grocery stores and by mail order. McVitie’s digestives are also distributed in Canada. Digestive biscuits are manufactured by Canadian companies – for example, by the Christie company.

== Ingredients ==
The typical digestive biscuit contains coarse brown wheat flour (which gives it its distinctive texture and flavour, similar to Graham flour), sugar, malt extract, vegetable oil, wholemeal, raising agents (usually sodium bicarbonate, tartaric acid and malic acid), and salt. Some varieties also contain dried whey, oatmeal, cultured skimmed milk, and emulsifiers such as DATEM.

Outside of the United States, such as in New Zealand and the United Kingdom, digestive biscuits are made using natural white sugar instead of sweeter high fructose corn syrup. Because of this, the sugar content of some digestive biscuits may be higher than that of ordinary biscuits. A digestive biscuit averages around 70 calories, although this varies according to the factors involved in its production.

== Consumption ==
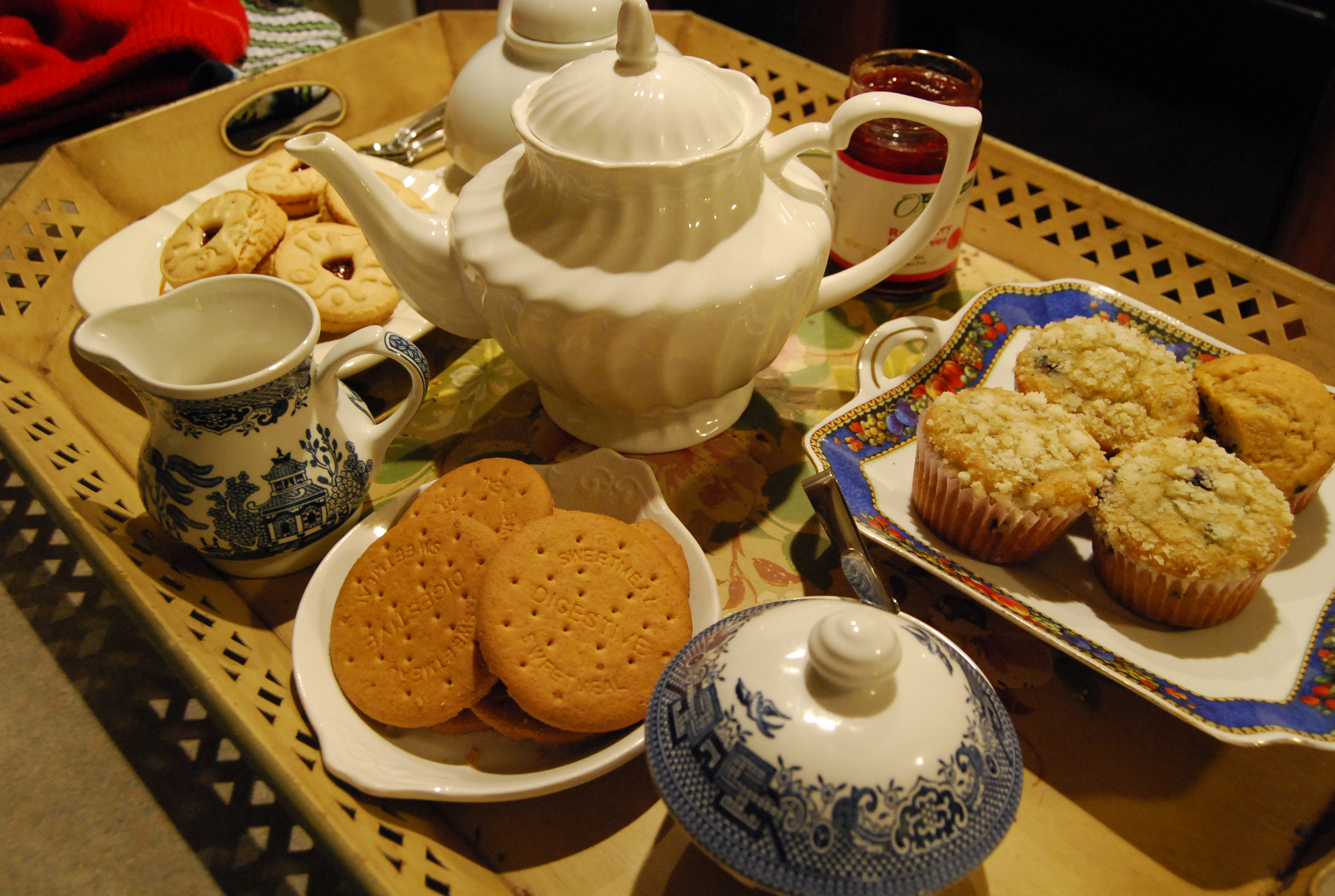
Plain digestive biscuits with tea, jam, Jammie Dodgers and cakes on a tray for afternoon tea served in London

Digestive biscuits are frequently eaten with tea or coffee. Sometimes, the biscuit is dunked into the tea and eaten quickly due to the biscuit's tendency to break or disintegrate when wet. Digestive biscuits are one of the top 10 biscuits in the UK for dunking in tea. The digestive biscuit is also used as a cracker with cheeses, and is often included in "cracker selection" packets in supermarkets and cheese boards in restaurants.

In the UK, McVitie's digestive is the best selling biscuit, with 80 million packs sold annually, though there are many other popular brands (such as Cadbury) as well as supermarkets' own versions. Digestives are also popular in food preparation for making into bases for cheesecakes and similar desserts. They are used as an ingredient in traybakes, notably the Ulster traybake Fifteens.

== Chocolate digestives ==
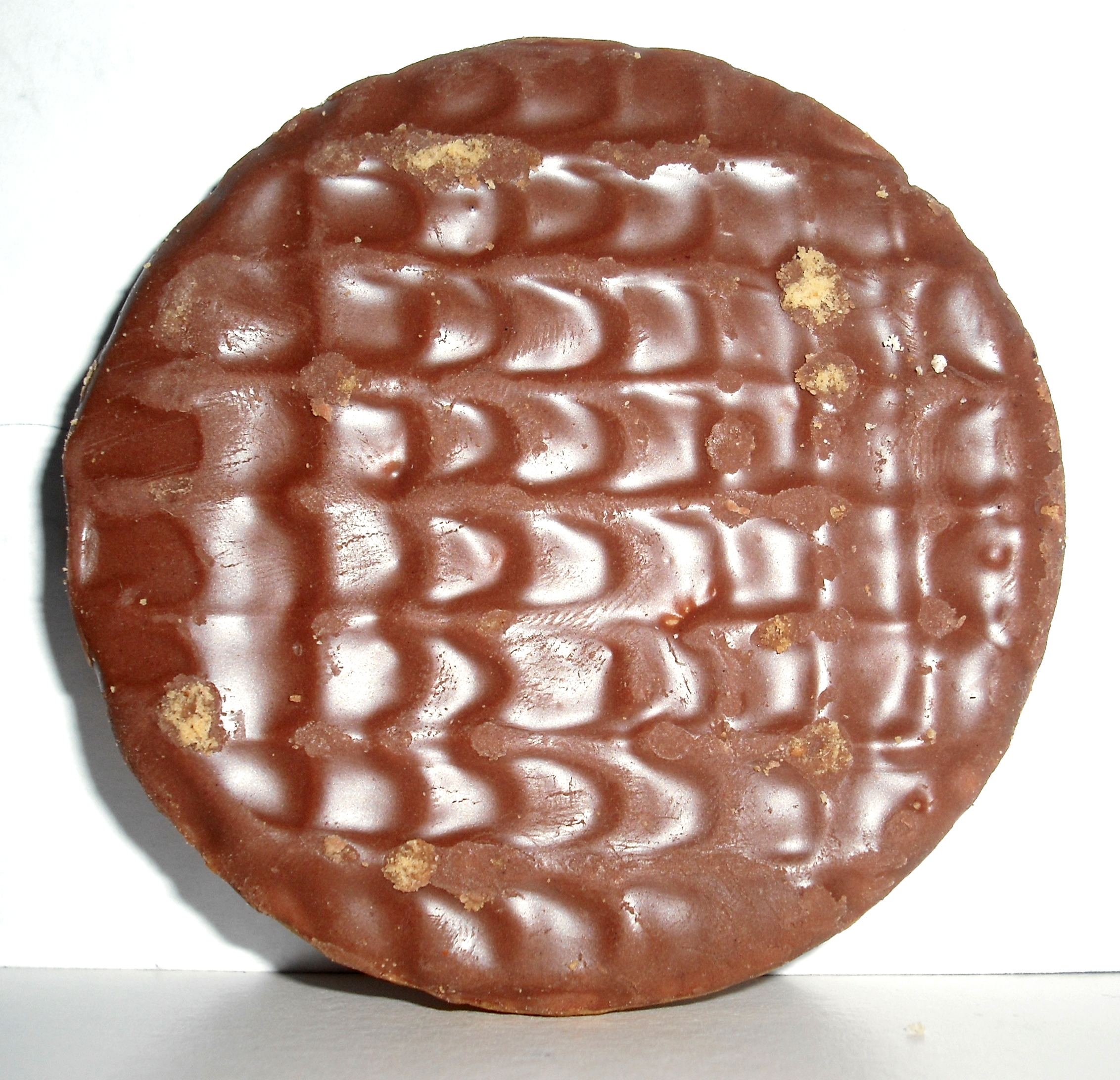
The coated side of a McVitie's milk chocolate digestive biscuit

Digestive biscuits with a chocolate coating on the lower side are also available, using dark, milk or white chocolate. The chocolate digestive was originally produced by McVitie's in 1925 as the Chocolate Homewheat Digestive. Other varieties include the basic biscuit with chocolate shavings throughout (chocolate "chips" in the biscuit mix) or a layer of caramel, mint chocolate, orange-flavoured chocolate, or plain chocolate. They are manufactured at McVitie's Harlesden factory in London. American travel writer Bill Bryson described the chocolate digestive as "a British masterpiece".

In 2009, the McVitie's chocolate digestive was named as the most popular biscuit in the UK to dunk into tea. The chocolate variant from McVitie's is routinely ranked the UK's favourite snack. A YouGov poll saw Cadbury's digestive ranked the second-most popular biscuit in the UK after McVitie's.

== In popular culture ==
McVitie's digestive biscuits have become known among fans of the Beatles because they were the cause of an argument between George Harrison and John Lennon during a recording session for the group's 1969 album Abbey Road. The incident was recounted by recording engineer Geoff Emerick in his book Here, There, and Everywhere: My Life Recording the Music of The Beatles. According to Emerick, Lennon's wife, Yoko Ono was in the recording studio and at one point helped herself to Harrison's box of McVitie's while the Beatles were in the control room listening to a playback of the song they had just recorded. Harrison became angry at Ono, and his subsequent outburst caused Lennon to lose his temper in response.

Chocolate digestives were part of the technical challenge to the bakers in series 13, episode 6 of The Great British Bake Off. They were also the technical challenge to the bakers in episode 2, season 2 of The Great Canadian Baking Show.

== See also ==
- Graham flour
- Graham cracker
- Marie biscuit
- Rich tea

== Sources ==
- Emerick, Geoff; Massey, Howard (2006). Here, There and Everywhere My Life Recording the Music of The Beatles. New York: Penguin Books. ISBN 978-1-59240-179-6.
