= Jan Voerman =

Dutch painter

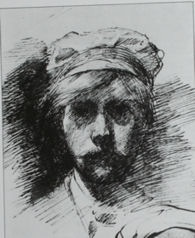
Self-portrait, c. 1890

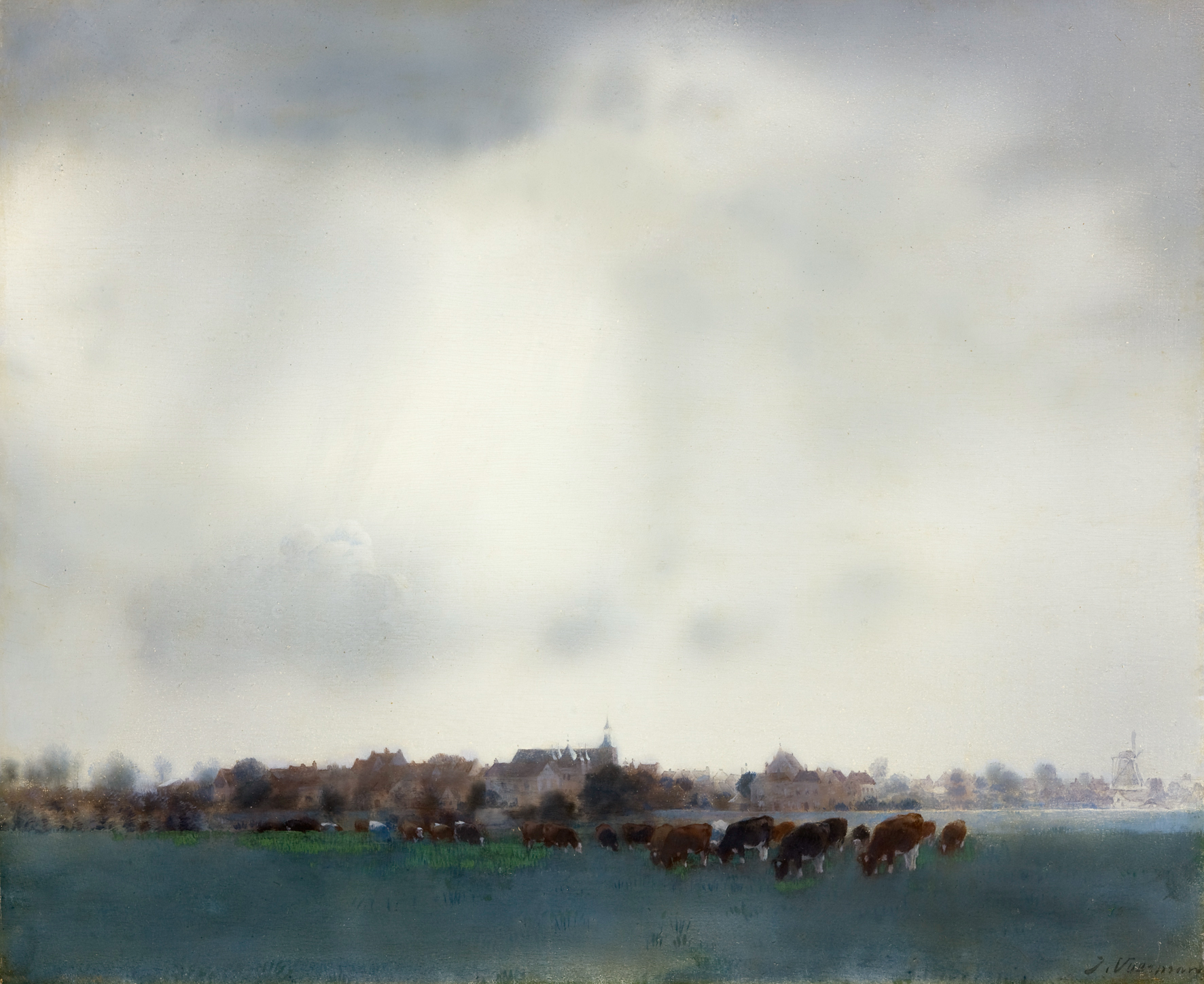
Gezicht op Hattem (View of Hattem)

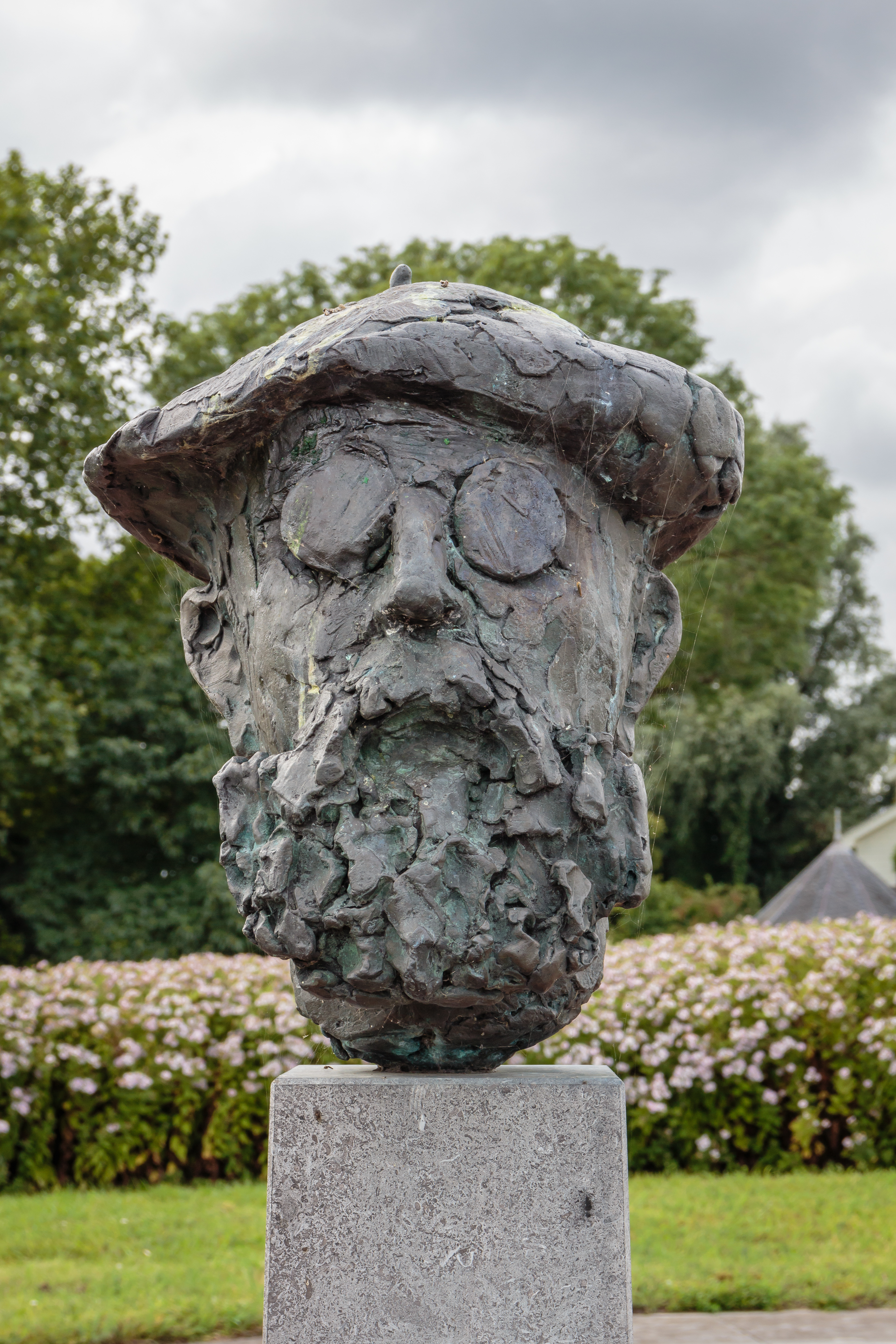
Hattem, 'head of painter' Jan Voerman Artwork by 'Elisabeth Varga'. Material: bronze. in the city park.

Jan Voerman (25 January 1857 – 25 March 1941), also known as Jan Voerman Sr., was a Dutch painter.

== Personal life ==
Voerman was born in Kampen and died in Hattem.

Voerman studied at the Rijksakademie van Beeldende Kunsten (English: State Academy of Fine Arts) in Amsterdam and the Royal Academy of Fine Arts Antwerp under Charles Verlat. He admired the work of his contemporary George Hendrik Breitner. Around 1900, Voerman painted the clouds above the IJssel river. In Hattem, many of his works can be seen in the Voerman Museum Hattem (nl).

He married Anna Henriette Gezina Verkade, daughter of Ericus Gerhardus Verkade–founder of the Verkade company in Zaandam–and Eduarda Thalia Koning, on 1 October 1889 in Amsterdam. Verkade was the sister of Jan Verkade, who at the end of the 1880s was Voerman's apprentice. Voerman and Verkade had two sons, Jan Voerman Jr. (1890–1976) and Tijs Voerman (1891–1970), who both also became illustrators.

== Work ==
Work by Voerman can be found in the collections of the Rijksmuseum Amsterdam, the Isabella Stewart Gardner Museum, Boston, US, the Museum de Fundatie in Zwolle, the Voerman Museum Hattem, the Drents Museum and the Stedelijk Museum Zutphen.
