= Netherlands–Russia relations =

- Netherlands: Russia

Diplomatic mission
- Embassy of the Netherlands, Moscow: Embassy of Russia, The Hague

Netherlands–Russia relations is the relationship between the two countries, the Kingdom of the Netherlands and the Russian Federation. Russia has an embassy in The Hague, and the Netherlands has an embassy in Moscow, a consulate in Saint Petersburg, and an honorary consulate in Yuzhno-Sakhalinsk.

Since the year 2013, political relations have become strained due to a number of conflicts and incidents, the most prominent being the annexation of Crimea in 2014, the shooting down of MH17 in 2014 that killed 193 Dutch nationals, the war in Donbas and the full-scale invasion of Ukraine in 2022.

In October 2018, the Russian Ambassador to the Netherlands was summoned to the Ministry of Foreign Affairs as the Dutch authorities accused four Russians with diplomatic passports for attempting to carry out a cyber-attack in April on the headquarters of Organisation for the Prohibition of Chemical Weapons in The Hague. Ank Bijleveld, the former Minister of Defence in Mark Rutte's government, told Dutch broadcaster NPO that the Netherlands is in a state of "cyberwar" with Russia.

In 2022 the Netherlands, a NATO member, gave strong support to Ukraine when it was invaded by Russia. Most economic and cultural ties were ended and harsh sanctions were imposed. The Netherlands continues to support Ukraine through procurement of military equipment, diplomatic measures, economic sanctions on Russia, humanitarian aid, welcoming of refugees and reconstruction assistance. The Netherlands has pledged to reduce its dependence on Russian energy alongside its partners in the EU and NATO.

== History ==
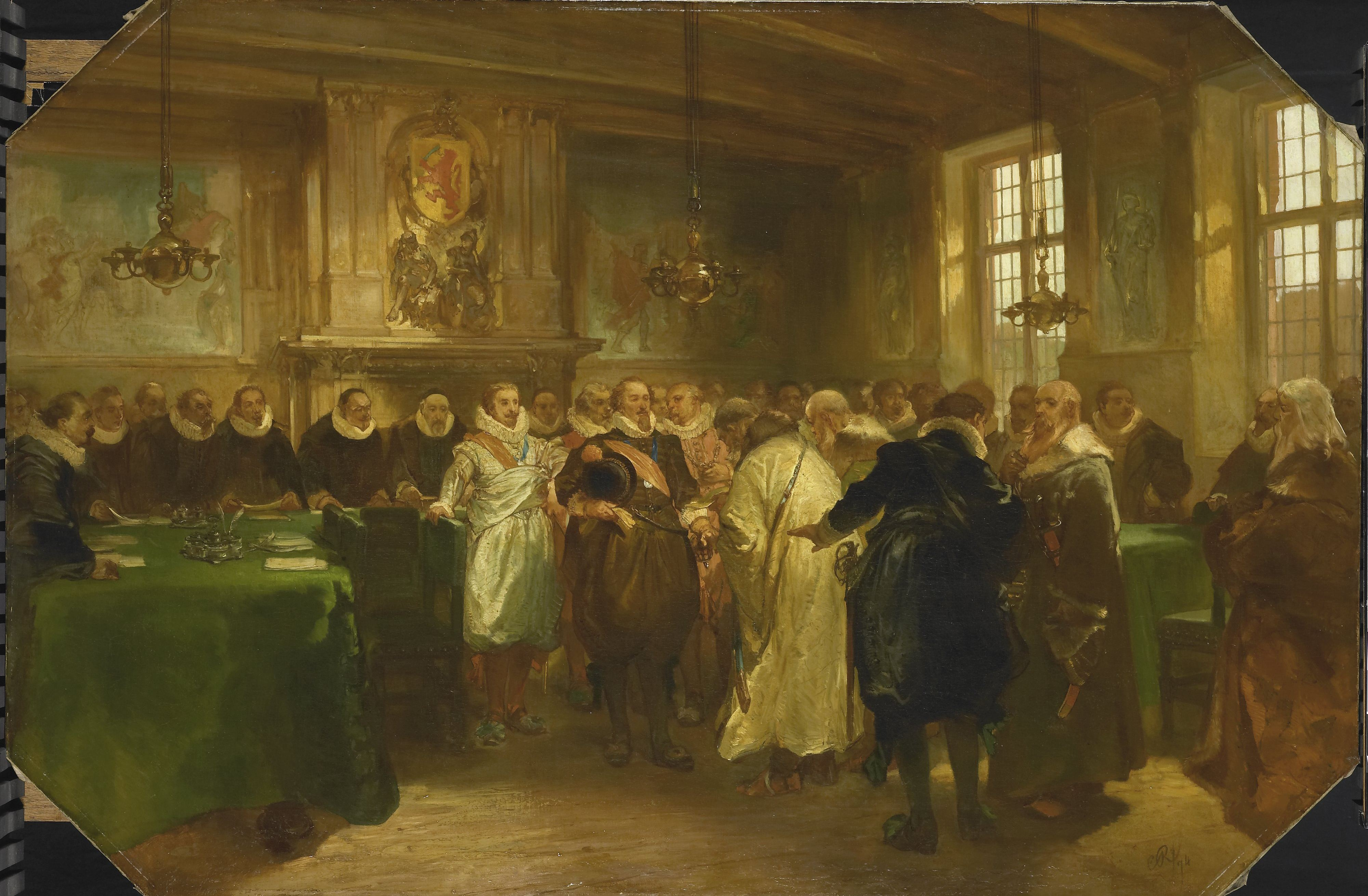
Maurice, Prince of Orange receives a delegation from Russia in 1614

=== Early relations ===
In the late 16th and 17th centuries, merchants from the Netherlands engaged in lively trade with Tsarist Russia; Dutch ships arrived in Russia via the port of Arkhangelsk, where they acquired wood, furs, and other raw materials. In return, the Dutch exported weapons and shipbuilding materials to the Russians, among other things, which contributed to Russia's military modernization. Peter the Great whilst on his tour of western Europe (1697–1698) visited the Netherlands and practised as a shipwright in Zaandam. During his stay, he managed to recruit some Dutch maritime expertise for the newly established Russian navy. One of the most notable Dutch members of the Russian navy was the Norwegian-born captain Cornelius Cruys, who after several years of service reached the rank of admiral and became the first commander of the Baltic Fleet. Influenced by his experiences, he introduced many Western European influences to Russia. For example, the new capital city of Saint Petersburg (founded in 1703) was modeled on Amsterdam, and even the Russian tricolor flag is based on the Dutch flag.

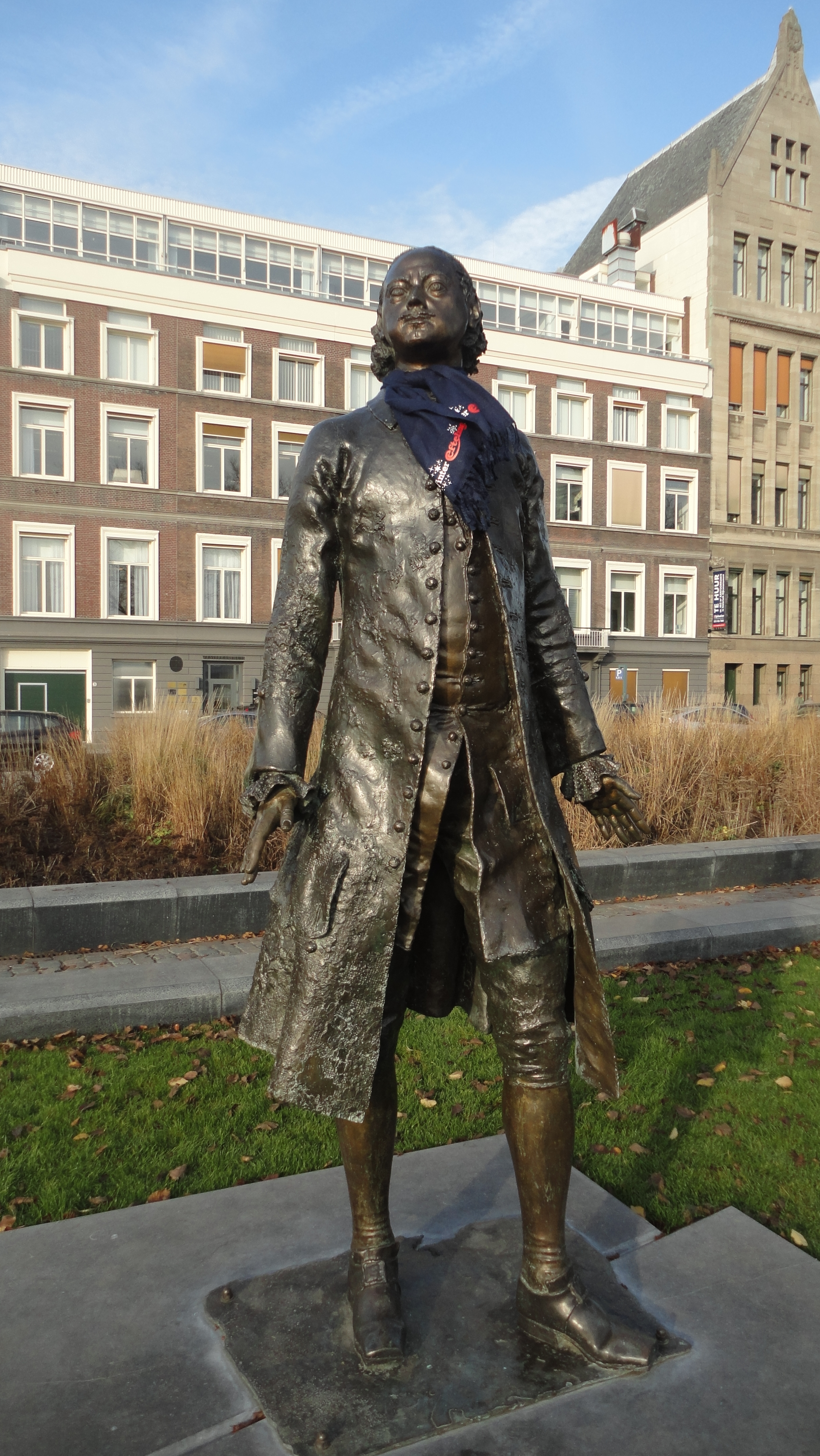
Statue of Peter the Great in Rotterdam, Netherlands.

=== Napoleonic Wars until the Russian revolution ===
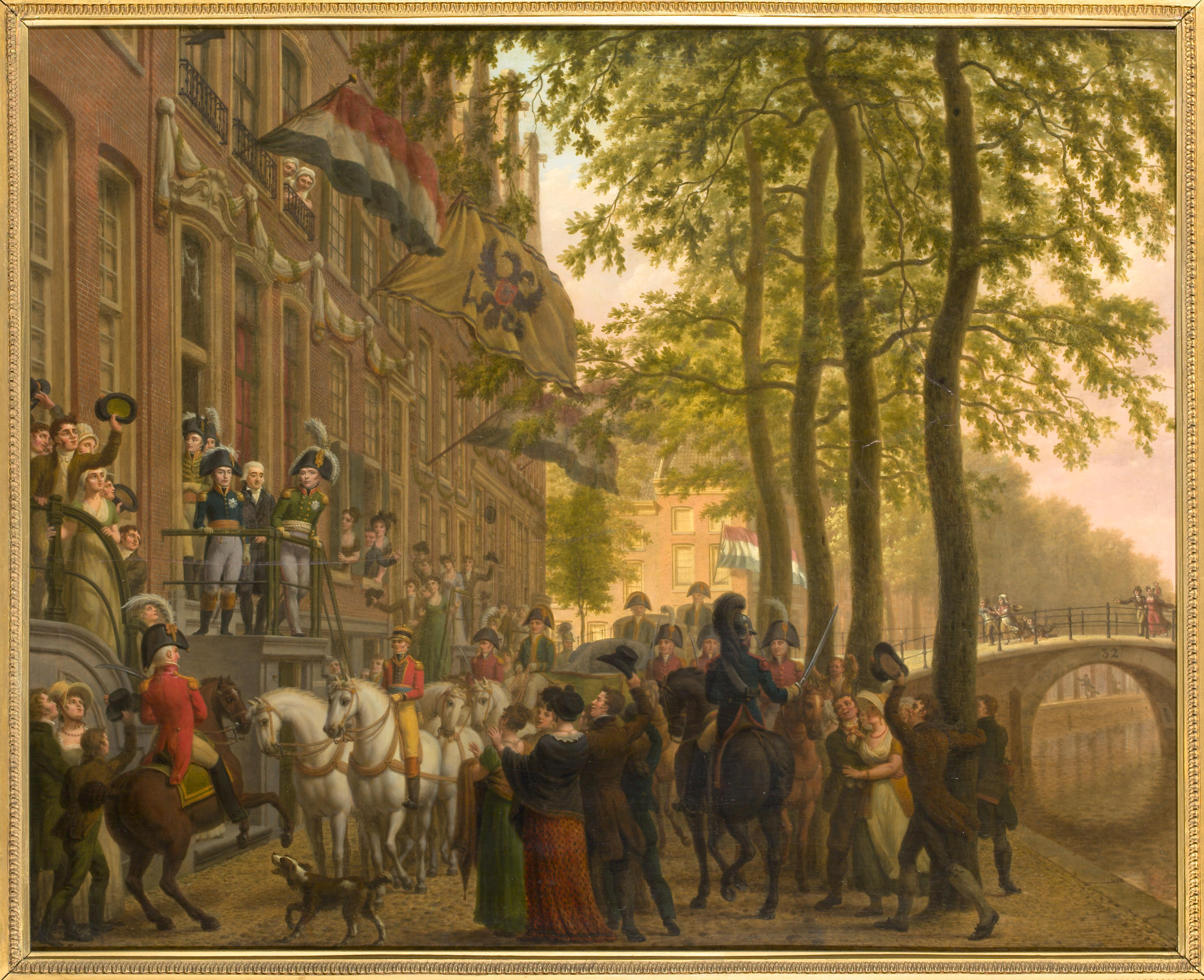
Alexander I of Russia and William I of the Netherlands in Amsterdam in 1814

Dutch Grenadiers of the Imperial Guard and other Dutch units took part in the French invasion of Russia in 1812.

Tsar Alexander I of Russia played a central role in the restoration of the Netherlands. Alexander promised to support Prince William and help restore an independent Netherlands with William as king. Russian and Prussian troops drove out the French in 1813.

To strengthen relations, Alexander's sister, Grand Duchess Anna Pavlovna, married Prince William, thereby establishing a family bond between the royal houses.

The Netherlands remained neutral in the conflicts of the 19th century and did not come into direct confrontation with Russia. For example, it remained neutral in the Crimean War (1853–1856). A sign of cooperation was that, on the initiative of Russian Tsar Nicholas II, the Hague Conventions of 1899 and 1907 were held in the Netherlands.

The Netherlands remained neutral in the First World War (1914–1918), while Russia fought on the side of the Entente.

=== From the revolution until the Cold War ===
Since the Russian Revolution, the Netherlands did not have any diplomatic relationships with the Soviet Union until the end of the Second World War. During the war, the Dutch government was in exile.

During WW2, 25,000 Dutch volunteers joined the Waffen SS, and fought on the Eastern front against the Soviet Union. They were not supported by the government in exile.

=== During the Cold War ===
During the Cold War, every single Dutch government perceived the Soviet Union and the Warsaw Pact as a threat to its safety, firmly joining the Western Bloc and pro-capitalist organizations.

=== Russian Federation ===
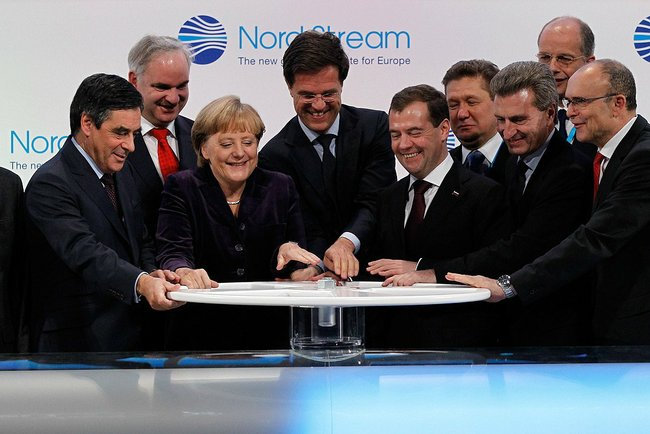
Nord Stream 1 opening ceremony on 8 November 2011 with Russian President Dmitry Medvedev and Dutch Prime Minister Mark Rutte

As the Netherlands is a member of the European Union, the relation between Russia and the Netherlands is closely tied to Russian–European Union relations.

In October 2011, president Dmitry Medvedev met with the Prime Minister of Netherlands Mark Rutte in the Kremlin to discuss bilateral ties.

Aside from commerce and politics, there has been some Dutch influence on Russian football, with Guus Hiddink (2006–2010) and Dick Advocaat (2010–2012) serving as the head coaches of the Russian national team. Many Dutch footballers have played in the Russian Premier League, including Quincy Promes, Alexander Büttner, Guus Til, Lorenzo Ebecilio, Tonny Vilhena and Royston Drenthe. Similarly, many Russians have played in the Eerste Divisie, such as Igor Korneev, Sergei Temryukov, Dmitri Bulykin and Denis Klyuyev. Many Russian athletes have played in various Dutch sporting leagues, and vice-versa as well.

In the year 2013, a number of cultural activities took place in the Netherlands and Russia to celebrate the 400th anniversary of diplomatic ties. Russian president Vladimir Putin visited Amsterdam. In October 2013, the ties between the countries were strained when a group of Greenpeace activists were arrested during a protest on an Arctic oil rig owned by Gazprom. On 9 October, the minister counsellor Dmitri Borodin, working at the Russian embassy in The Hague, was detained after allegations of abusing his children. Dutch minister of foreign affairs Frans Timmermans apologized later for the violation of the Vienna Convention on Diplomatic Relations. Subsequently, on 15 October, the Dutch diplomat Onno Elderenbosch was physically attacked in his apartment in Moscow by two men posing as electricians. During the 2014 Sochi Olympic Games, Vladimir Putin visited the Holland Heineken House and drank a beer with King Willem Alexander.

Since March 2014, the Netherlands participated in the European Union economic sanctions against Russia due to the Russo-Ukrainian war. In August 2014 Russia installed a retaliatory boycott of EU agricultural products.

Relations were further strained when Malaysia Airlines Flight 17, an airliner carrying 193 Dutch nationals, was shot down over Eastern Ukraine in July 2014, by a BUK missile launcher. A few years later, a Dutch court found two Russians and a Ukrainian guilty. It is unlikely that these people will serve their sentences.

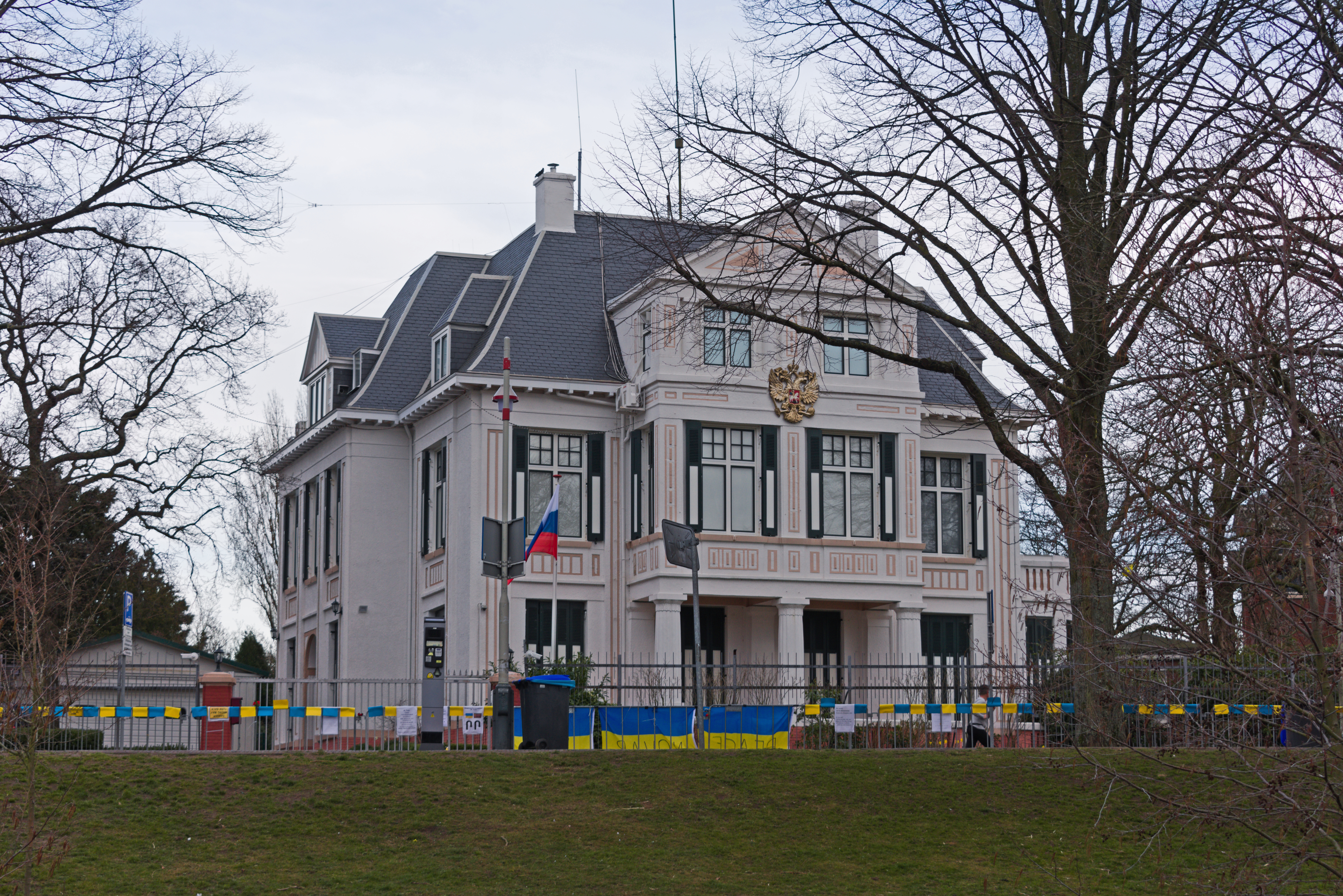
Ukrainian flags in front of the Russian embassy in The Hague as protest against the Russian invasion of Ukraine

After the Russian invasion of Ukraine in 2022, the Netherlands, as one of the EU countries, imposed comprehensive economic sanctions on Russia, and Russia added all EU countries to the list of "unfriendly nations", including the Netherlands. The Netherlands joined other countries in spring 2022 in declaring a number of Russian diplomats Persona non grata. In May 2024, Dutch Foreign Minister Hanke Bruins Slot said that the Netherlands would not object if Ukraine used Dutch-supplied F-16 fighters to strike military targets inside Russia. The Netherlands has actively been supporting the Ukrainian government through military funding and diplomatic efforts.

As part of the NATO alliance, Dutch air forces stationed in Poland shot down several Russian drones during the 2025 Russian drone incursion into Poland.

== Trade ==
Between 1995 and 2021, Russian exports to the Netherlands have risen by an average of 14.4% per annum.

In 2021, there was an imbalance in trade with the Netherlands importing $39 billion from Russia, mainly crude and refined oil, with exports of only $7.8 billion. In 2022 and 2023, the EU introduced sanctions over Russian oil and gas imports, which the Netherlands has complied with and will allow them to greatly reduce the trade imbalance with Russia. The Netherlands has earmarked alternative sources for petrochemical imports and developments in renewables.

== Notable Russians in the Netherlands ==
- Peter the Great: Autocratic Tsar of Russia who spent some time in Amsterdam during his youth.
- Anna Pavlovna of Russia: Queen consort of The Netherlands.
- Anish Giri: Well-known Chess Grandmaster born in Russia.
- Alexander Vakoulsky: Soviet-born music conductor who emigrated to The Netherlands.
- Mikhail Fridman: Russian-Israeli Oligarch.
- Rusluie: Community of wealthy traders in Saint Petersburg during imperial times.

== Notable Dutch in Russia ==
- Dick Advocaat: Former Dutch football manager who served as the head coach of the Russia national football team.
- Willem Barentsz: Iconic Dutch seafarer, cartographer and explorer.
- Cornelius Cruys
- Guus Hiddink: Former Dutch football manager who served as the head coach of the Russia national football team.
- André Kuipers: Astronaut.
- Karel van het Reve: Slavophilic essayist and correspondent of the Parool Dutch newspaper in the Soviet Union. An influential Anti-communist activist.
- Derk Sauer: Dutch entrepreneur who founded the Moscow Times and many other popular magazines in Russia.
- Andrew Vinius: Experienced Russian statesman who acted as Peter the Great's mentor.
- Quincy Promes: A convicted felon and drug peddler who played professional football for FC Spartak Moscow.

== Resident diplomatic missions ==
- the Netherlands has an embassy in Moscow and a consulate-general in Saint Petersburg.
- Russia has an embassy in The Hague.
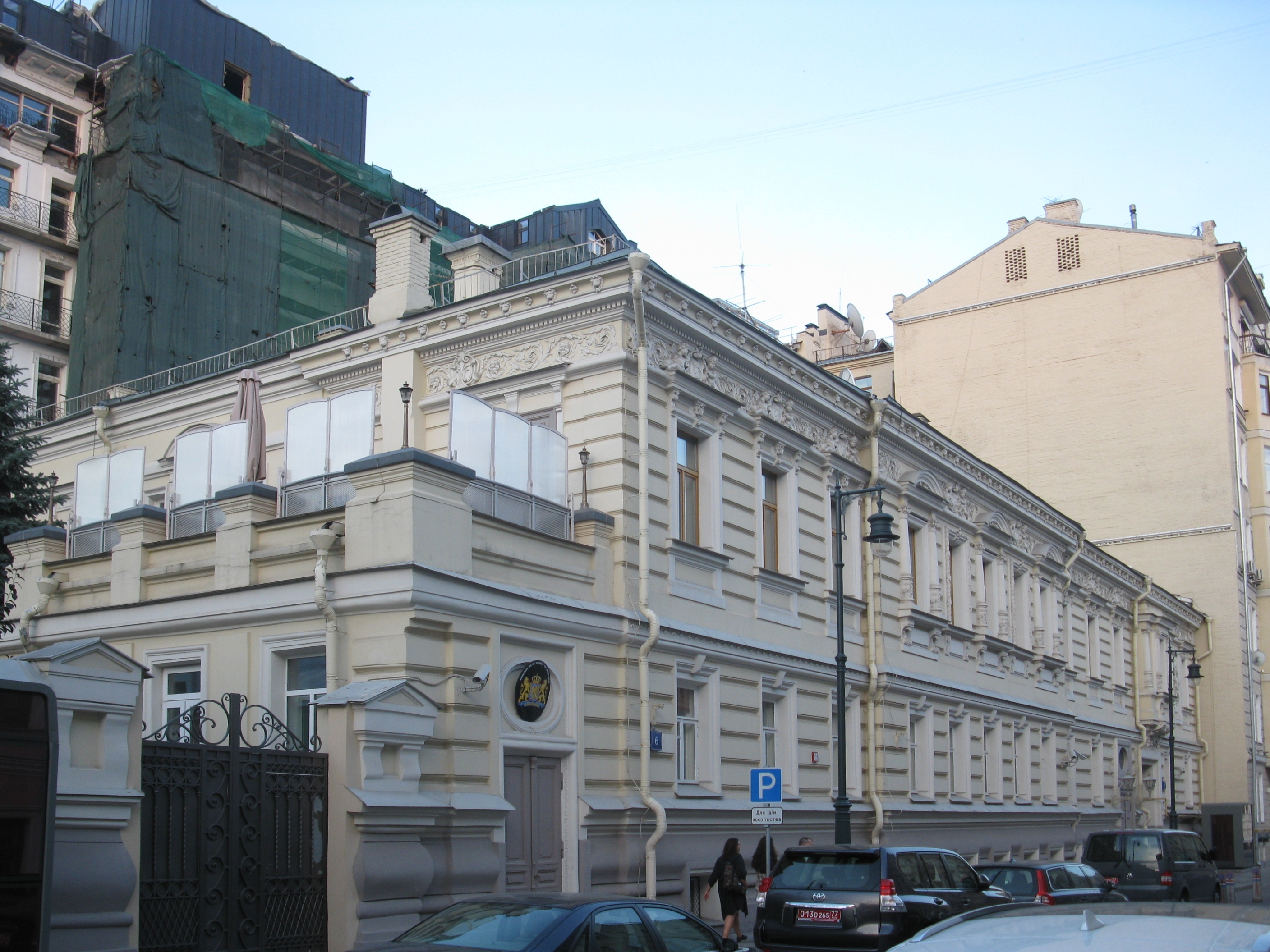
Embassy of the Netherlands in Moscow

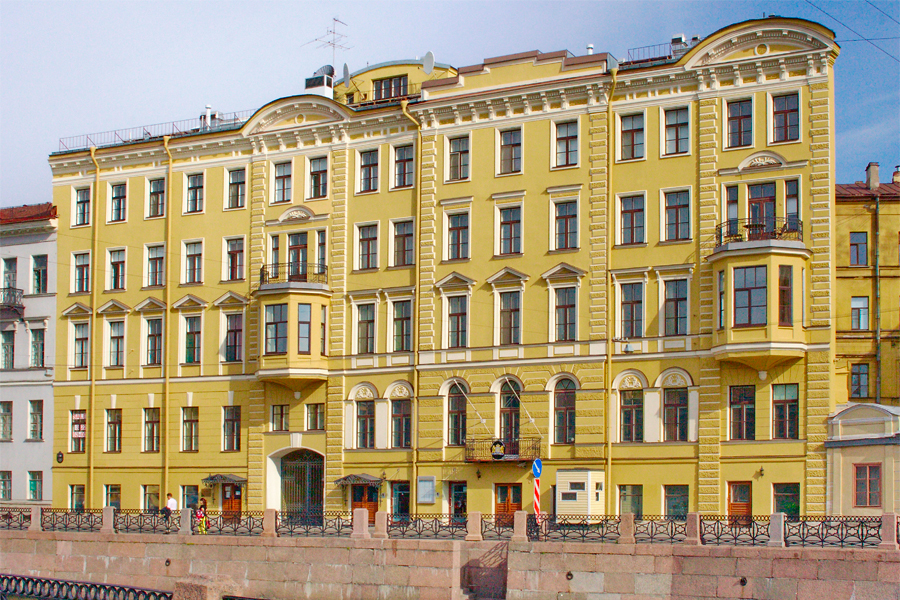
Consulate-General of the Netherlands in Saint Petersburg

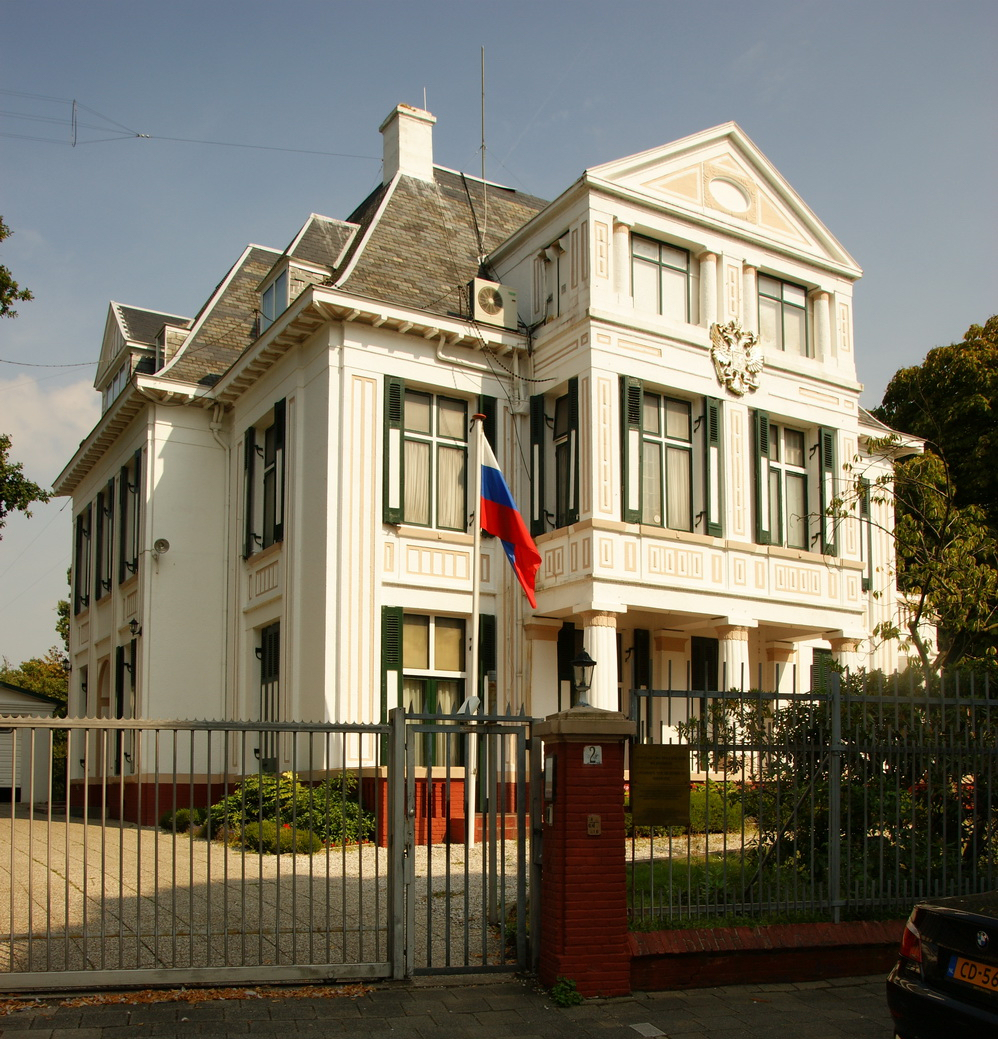
Embassy of Russia in The Hague

== See also ==
- Foreign relations of the Netherlands
- Foreign relations of Russia
- Greenpeace Arctic Sunrise ship case
- Czar Peter House (Netherlands)
- List of ambassadors of Russia to the Netherlands
- Russians in the Netherlands
