= Czar Peter House =

Czar Peter House may refer to:

- Cabin of Peter the Great
- Czar Peter House (Netherlands)
