= Verkade (family) =

Dutch patrician family

- Family
- Country: Netherlands
- Founded: 17th century

Verkade is the name of a Dutch patrician family originating from Maasland.

== History ==
Founder of the family is Pieter Leendertsz. Verkade who died in 1657. He was a farmer in de Commandeurspolder. His descendants worked in the local administration of the region. One branch of the family became known for being manufacturers of chocolate, rusk and cookies, after, in 1886, Ericus Verkade founded the Koninklijke Verkade N.V. company in Zaandam.

== Notable members ==
- Pieter Verkade (1767–1848), notary and mayor of Vlaardinger-ambacht en Zouteveen (now Vlaardingen)
- Ericus Gerhardus Verkade (1835–1907), founder of Verkade en Compagnie and owner of the bread-, cookies- and rusk bakery 'De Ruyter' in Zaandam. His five sons were:
  - Ericus Gerhardus Verkade (1868–1927), managing director of NV Verkade's Fabriek and alderman of Zaandam
  - Jan Verkade (1868–1946), painter, twin brother of Ericus Jr
  - Arnold Hendrik Verkade (1872–1952), managing director of NV Verkade's Fabriek
    - Jacobus Verkade (1906–2008), grandson of Ericus Verkade, specialized in sales and marketing, son of Arnold
  - Johan Anton Eduard Verkade (1875-19??), managing director of NV Verkade's Fabriek and chair of the Chamber of Commerce for Zaanland
  - Eduard Rutger Verkade (1878–1961), actor, stage-director
    - Iwan Verkade (1921–2002), diplomat and secretary-general of Foreign Affairs, son of Eduard
- Kees Verkade (1941–2020), sculptor

== Literature ==
- Nederland's Patriciaat 40 (1954), p. 373-383.
