= Co Verkade =

Jacobus Verkade (29 March 1906, Zaandam – 26 June 2008, Holten) was the grandson of Ericus Verkade, founder of the Verkade manufacturing company. He specialized in sales and marketing and was responsible for, for instance, the packaging of Verkade cookies in metal tins, which quickly became collector's items. Co Verkade began working for the company in 1924. In 1936, he and his four brothers (Frans, Arnold, Jan, and Tom) ran the company; Co was a company director until December 1960, when he was ousted by his brother Frans; he continued to work for the company until 1965.

Co Verkade is credited with making Verkade a household name in the Netherlands. One of his successful marketing ploys was the Verkade album; customers received a picture card with every roll of Verkade rusk which they glued into albums. These albums were on topics such as history, art, and especially nature--the latter written by Dutch botanist Jac. P. Thijsse. Generating a collecting mania among the Dutch population before World War II, 27 albums were made, a total of 3.2 million copies. At age 101, Co Verkade drove the first pile for the Verkade pavilion at the Zaans Museum.

He married Maja Knipscheer in 1929. After she died, in 1980, he lived with Ien, until her death in 2002. In 2005 he published an autobiography, Een leven in biskwie en chocolade ("A life in biscuits and chocolate").

== See also ==
- Verkade (family)
