= Jan Verkade =

Dutch painter

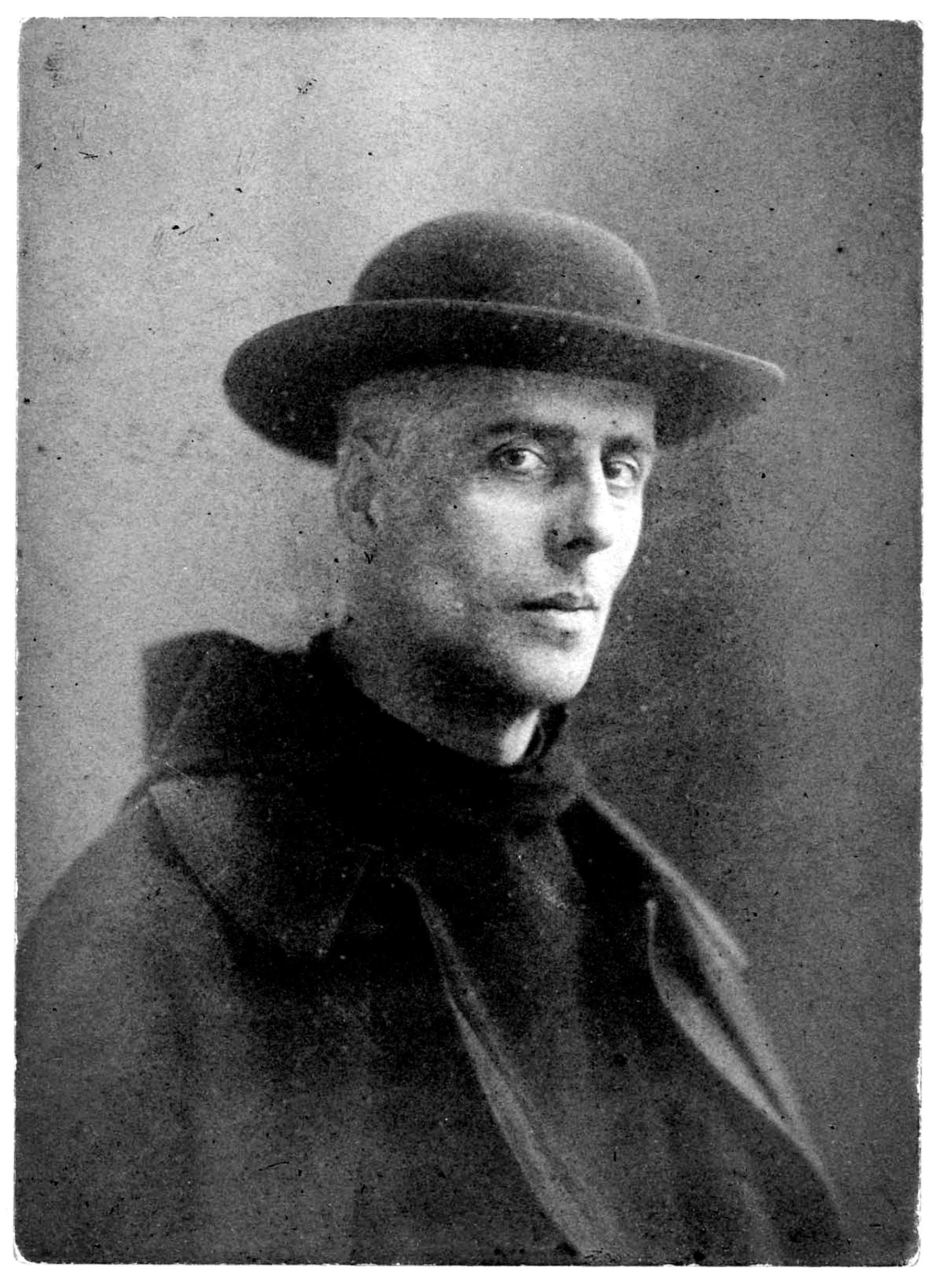
Jan Verkade in 1912 when he had become Father Willibrord

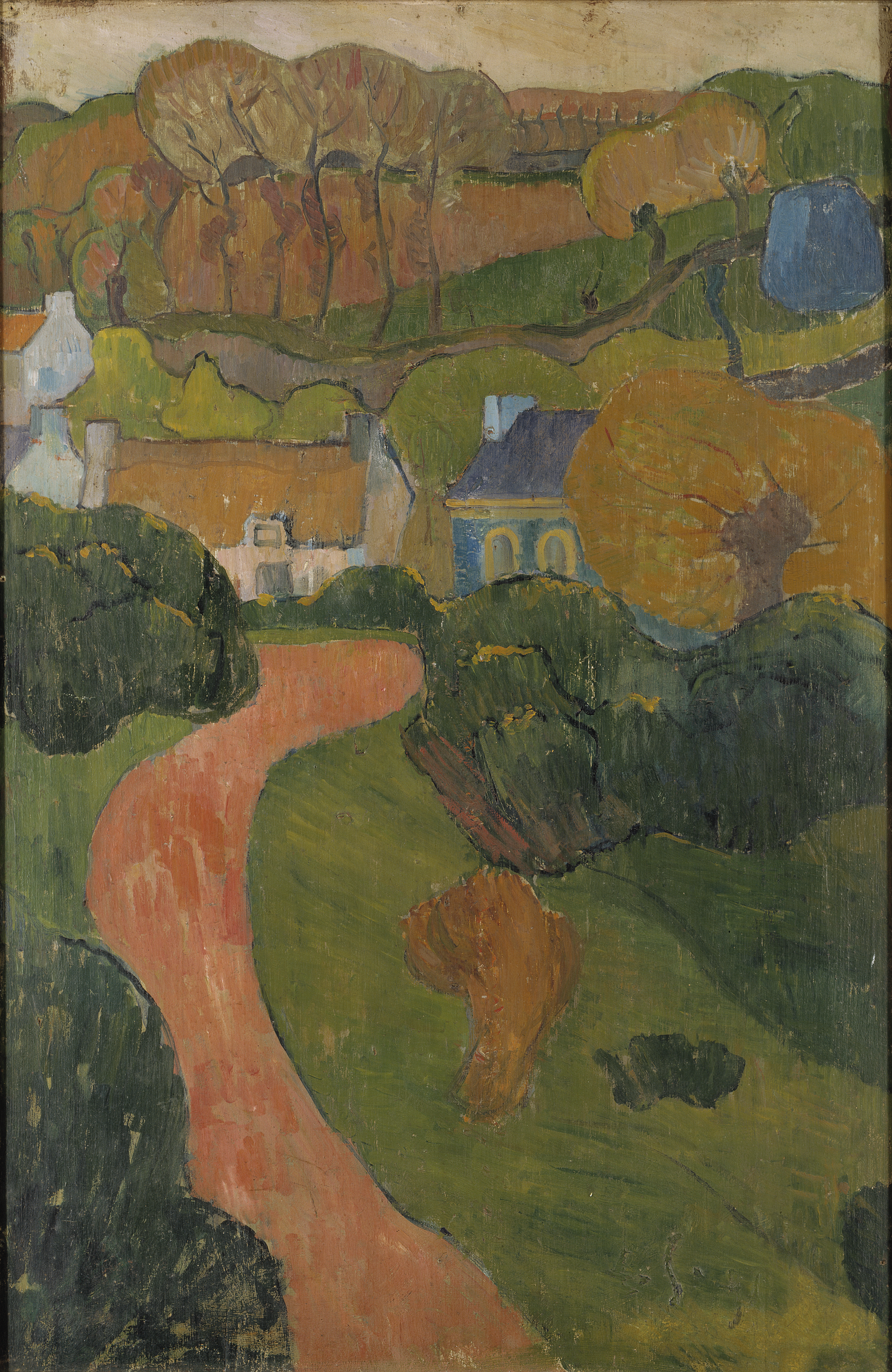
Decorative Landscape II, 1891.

Johannes Sixtus Gerhardus "Jan" Verkade (18 September 1868 – 19 July 1946), afterwards Willibrord Verkade O.S.B., was a Dutch Post-Impressionist and Christian Symbolist painter. A disciple of Paul Gauguin and friend of Paul Sérusier, he belonged to the circle of artists known as the Nabis. Of a Dutch anabaptist background, his artistic and spiritual journey led him to convert to Roman Catholicism, and to take Holy Orders as a Benedictine monk, taking the religious name Willibrord. He entered the Archabbey of Beuron and continued his work in a religious context, working closely with Desiderius Lenz, leader of the Beuron Art School. He worked throughout Europe and had an important influence on the continuing development of the new Benedictine Art.

== Young life ==
Jan Verkade was born one of twins in Zaandam, the son of Ericus Verkade, founder of a well-known baker's confectionery business. His father belonged to the Mennonite sect, a religious group which regarded Catholicism with hostility. In 1877 the family moved to Amsterdam, and the twins were sent to a religious boarding school in Oisterwijk where they were considered slow. From 1883 they attended the Handelsschule in Amsterdam. Throughout childhood they were always close companions.

A family visit to Cologne Cathedral and Trier, at the Porta Nigra, awakened Verkade's artistic passion for the Primitive and Classical. Jan took every opportunity to study and draw in the galleries of the Rijksmuseum, and often skipped school to sketch at the Zoological Gardens. He resisted expectations to join the family business and to be confirmed as Mennonite, and his father accepted Jan's decision to study at the Amsterdam State Academy of Fine Arts. His twin brother was sent to England for business training, after which they led separate lives.

He found two and a half years' study at the Rijksakademie, 1887–1889, technical but without spirit: seeking an artistic voice for his awakening religious sentiments in an age which glorified technology and city life, he courted rural solitude. He lived in Hattem for two years where, disappointed by much contemporary literature, he began to find answers in Tolstoy's A Confession, Huysmans's A Rebours, and the works of Baudelaire and Verlaine.

== Paris ==
Verkade moved to Paris in February 1891, where Meijer de Haan introduced him to Paul Gauguin. His stay in Paris was short but very intense. The Symbolist revolt against Naturalism and Realism was then at work, and at the Café Voltaire he met literary Symbolists surrounding the figure of Jean Moréas, including the critic Charles Morice, Albert Aurier, Julien Leclercq and the poet Adolphe Retté. Paul Verlaine occasionally appeared.

Jan sought out Paul Sérusier, Gauguin's pupil and disciple, and painted with him in his studio. He produced a group of still lifes based upon Gauguin's principles, on which Gauguin gave him advice and opened his thought. He explained to Verkade that aesthetic understanding must imbue the representation of Nature, that art-work must be both a material and a spiritual birth. Verkade saw this as an insight into the divine Creation. Sérusier and de Haan brought him among 'Les Nabis' (i.e. 'The Prophets'), especially those who met at Paul Ranson's studio, including Maurice Denis, Édouard Vuillard and his friend Pierre Bonnard, and Ker-Xavier Roussel, and Ranson dubbed him 'le nabi obéliscal.'

Ranson and Sérusier followed a form of orientalized Theosophy, and Verkade was exposed to the resurgent esoteric mysticism, interest in the Kabbalah and magic arts, which the Symbolists absorbed. He drew much from it, but adhered to Christian beliefs. He later acknowledged Jørgensen's view that the Symbolist movement had inherited social preoccupations emerging into the void created between loss of belief in the Christian miraculous, and the spiritual bankruptcy of material science.

== Brittany and Verkade's conversion ==
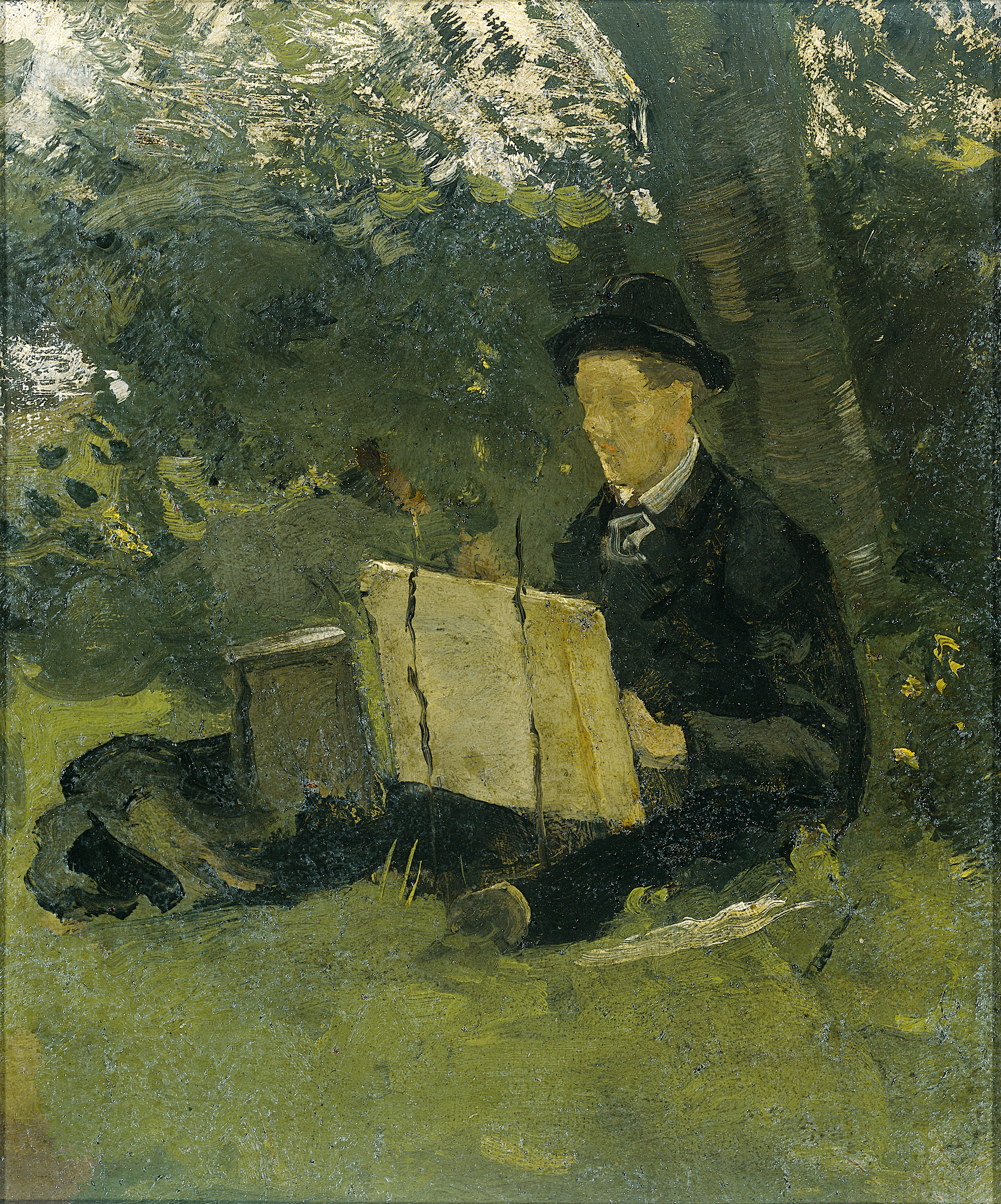
Verkade painting under a tree, 1892, by Richard Roland Holst (Rijksmuseum)

At the time of Gauguin's departure for Tahiti, April 1891, Verkade met Mogens Ballin, who joined Verkade and Sérusier in a sojourn in Brittany, where Paul had worked at Pont-Aven in the preceding years. Responding to the landscape and the embedded religious customs of the country people, and urged on by Sérusier's spiritual expositions, Verkade's religious feelings grew. At Huelgoat he became withdrawn and meditative, attending Mass for the first time. After some time at Le Pouldu, he went home to Amsterdam for four months, immersed in Balzac's Seraphita, and first read through the Credo while listening to Bach's Mass in B Minor. Sérusier visited, and they returned to Paris together.

Verkade exhibited with the Nabis in the 'Indépendants' Exhibition of March 1892. Nabi gatherings at Ranson's studio continued, but he soon returned to Saint-Nolff, armed with a Bible, a Catechism, Edouard Schuré's Les Grands Initiés (at Sérusier's recommendation) and the Confessions of St Augustine. Resuming work, he read Schuré thoroughly and realised its insufficiency for him. At Saint-Nolff he and Ballin grew towards Catholicism together: Verkade took formal instruction and was baptized at Vannes.

== Italy ==
Verkade and Ballin next travelled to Italy, staying first in Florence, and visiting Siena, Pisa and Pistoia. Deeply attracted by the life of the Franciscan monastery at Fiesole, and by the Franciscan ideal, Ballin was baptized (as 'Francesco') there, and they sought a period of residency. They were directed to Rome to seek assent, where they saw much and fell under the city's spell. Returning north by way of Assisi they awaited permission from the Provincial. Sérusier was then in Florence, and was surprised by, but not unappreciative of their conversion. Suddenly Ballin was recalled to Denmark for military service, and in May 1893 Verkade undertook his months of retreat at Fiesole alone. He found deep refreshment in the monastic life, peace in the order of holy service, and simplicity of heart and faith among the residents. While there he painted two murals, including one of St Francis, and heard warm reports of the artist-monks of Beuron.

== To Beuron ==
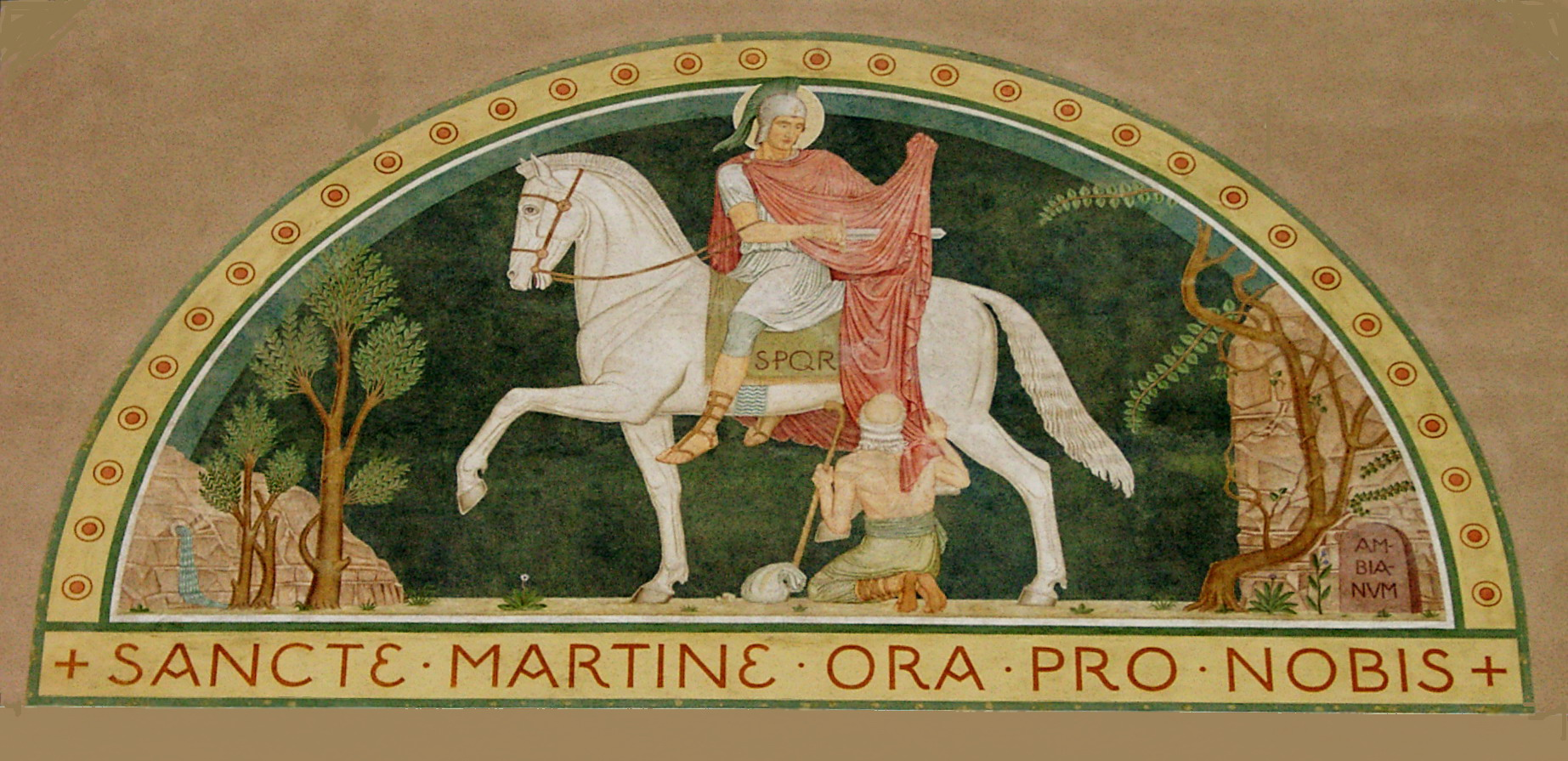
Image of St Martin at Beuron, attributed to Jan Verkade

In November, intending to revisit his family, he went first to Beuron and stayed for some time, seeing the Maurus Chapel and meeting Desiderius Lenz. The Abbey was now in its second phase, following its closure between 1875 and 1887 during the Kulturkampf. Adjusting to Benedictine customs, Verkade was transported by the Gregorian music of the Mass, and deeply impressed by the evolution of the Beuron artwork, which was diverging from modern art, the volumes being increasingly subordinated to the stylistic elements of the Cornelius and Kaulbach schools. In the Benedictine life grounded in the liturgy, at once earnest and joyful, reserved and meditative, steady and versatile, for Verkade spirit, intellect and heart all had their celebration, and all arts served their true ends.

After visiting home, where he found acceptance, and having spent some time with Ballin in Copenhagen (where an exhibition of his work was mounted), he returned to Beuron. Understanding the decision before him he laid aside his private career and in 1894 was received as an oblate into the community. So began the fruition of his work in the Beuron Art School.

== Writings ==
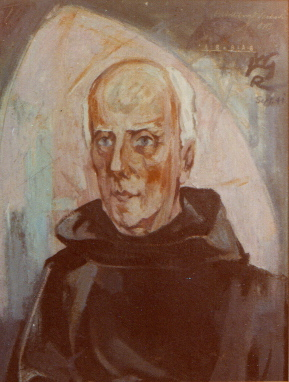
Verkade in 1946 (artist: Rudolf Heinisch)

- Verkade, Willibrord (Ed.): Des Cennino Cennini Handbüchlein der Kunst. Neuübersetzt und herausgegeben. (Heitz und Mundel, Strasbourg 1916).
- Verkade, Willibrord: Die Unruhe zu Gott. Erinnerungen eines Malermönchs (Herder & Co., Freiburg im Breisgau 1920). 5th Edition (32-37th thousand), Imprimatur 1929, Published 1930. (German). In French as Le Tourment de Dieu: Étapes d'un Moine Peintre (translation by Marguerite Faure), (L. Rouart & J. Waterlin, Paris 1923). In English as Die Unruhe zu Gott: Yesterdays of an Artist-Monk (translation by J.L. Stoddard) (P.J. Kenedy & Sons, New York 1930). By 1930 there were also published translations into Dutch, Italian, Spanish and Hungarian.
- Verkade, Willibrord (Ed.), Jan van Ruysbroeck (Translations from Old Flemish into New High German)

Jan van Ruysbroeck 1. Die Zierde der geistlichen Hochzeit [The Spiritual Espousals] (Matthias-Grünewald-Verlag, Mainz - Hermann Rauch, Wiesbaden 1922).
Jan van Ruysbroeck 2. Aus den Buch von den zwolf Berghinen [From the Book of the Twelve Beguines] (Matthias-Grünewald-Verlag, Mainz - Hermann Rauch, Wiesbaden 1923).
Jan van Ruysbroeck 3. Das Reich der Geliebten [Kingdom of the Divine Lovers] (Matthias-Grünewald-Verlag, Mainz - Hermann Rauch, Wiesbaden 1924).

- Verkade, Willibrord: Der Antrieb ins Vollkommene. Erinnerungen eines Malermönchs (Herder & Co., Freiburg im Breisgau 1931). Sequel to Die Unruhe zu Gott. ? As In Quest of Beauty (P.J. Kenedy & Sons, New York 1935).
- Verkade, Willibrord: Das Neue Gertrudenbuch, enthaltend St. Gertruds 'Geistliche Übungen' und Auszüge samt Gebeten aus dem 'Gesandten der göttlichen Liebe'. (Herder & Co., Freiburg im Breisgau 1936). (Reprinted by Freundeskreis Kloster Helfta e.V., o.J., Halle).
- Verkade, Willibrord: Spuren des Daseins. Erkentnisse des Malermönchs Willibrord Verkade OSB (Matthias-Grünewald-Verlag, Mainz 1938).

Verkade's portrait was painted by various other artists, including Richard Roland Holst (1891) and Rudolf Heinisch (1946).

== Gallery ==
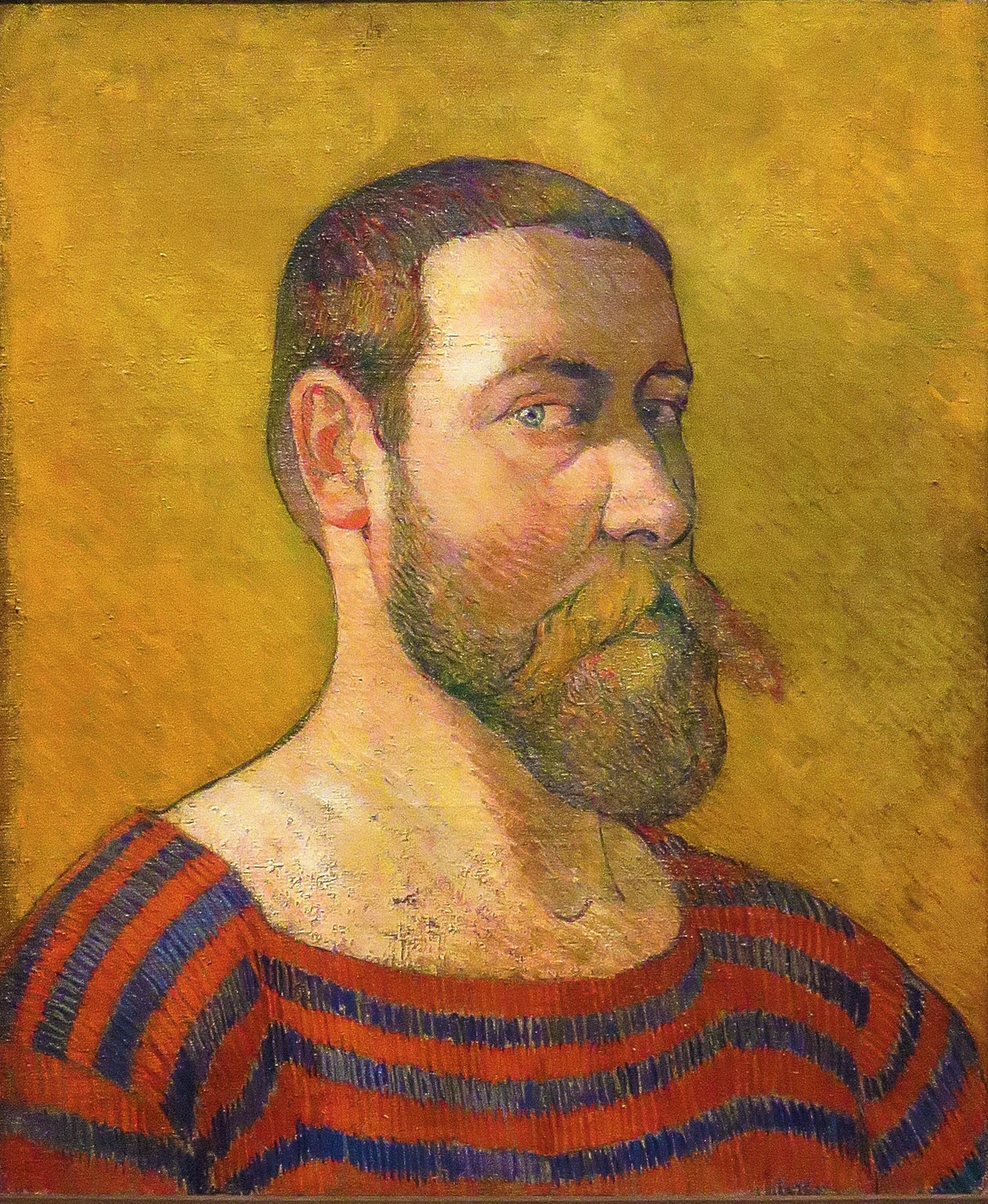
Self-portrait (1891/94)

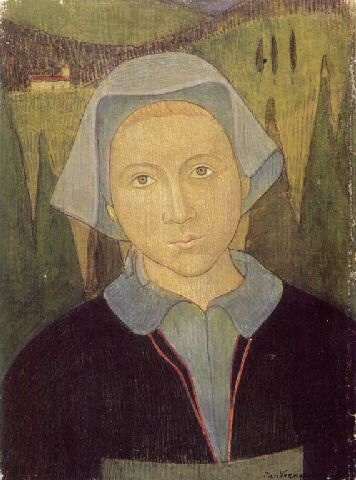
Herinnering (Remembering) (1891/92)

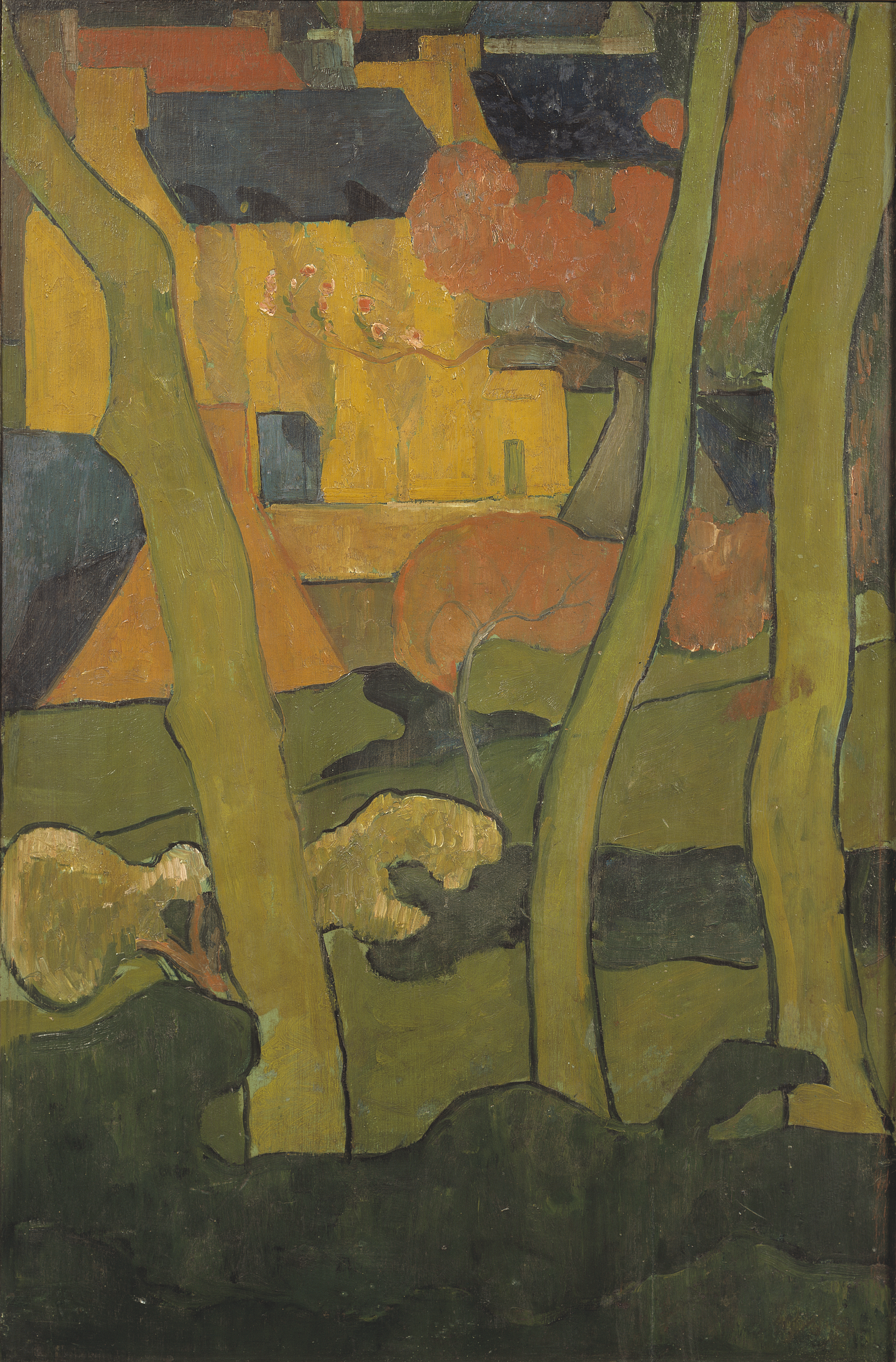
Decorative Landscape I

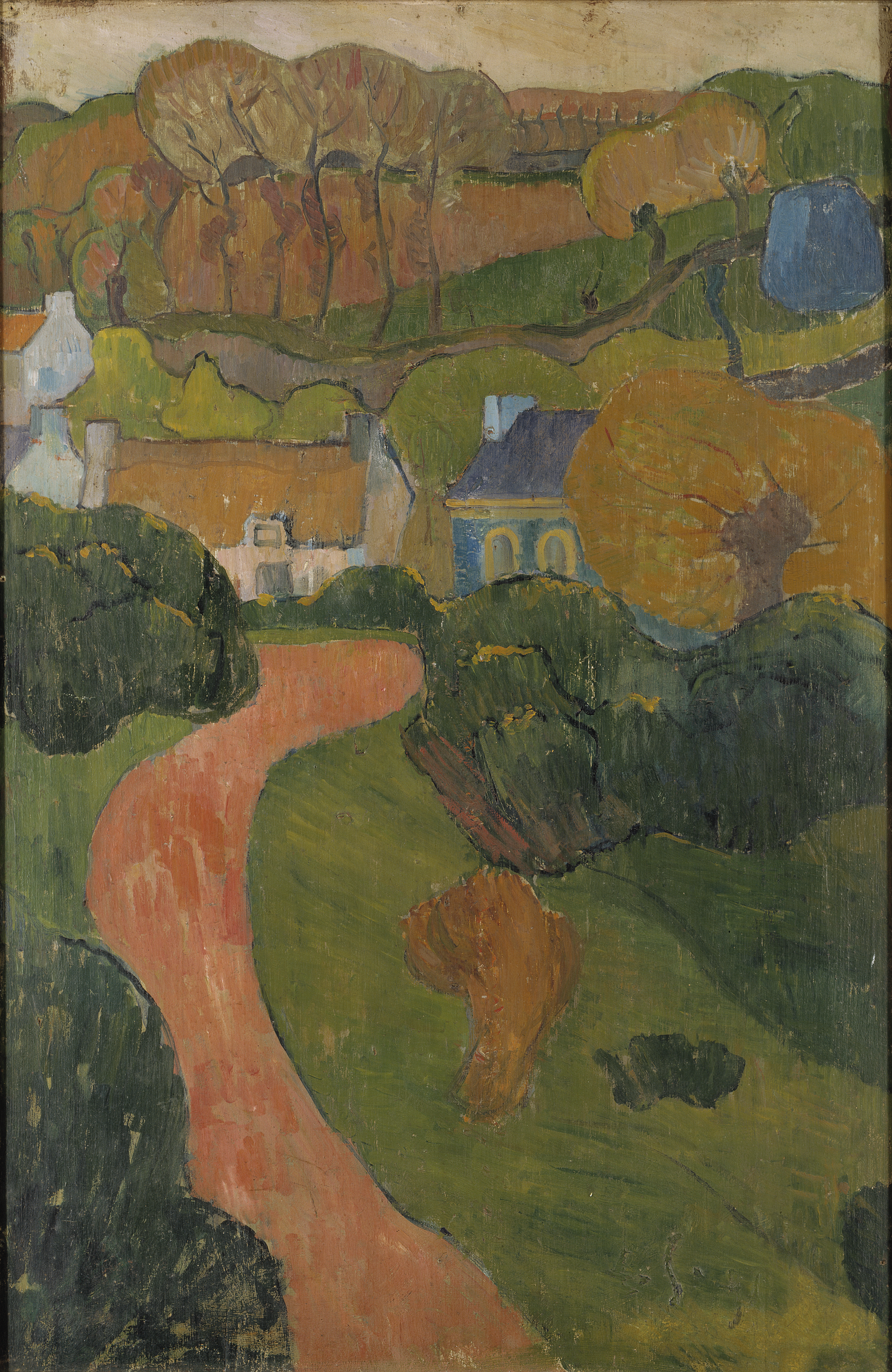
Decorative Landscape II

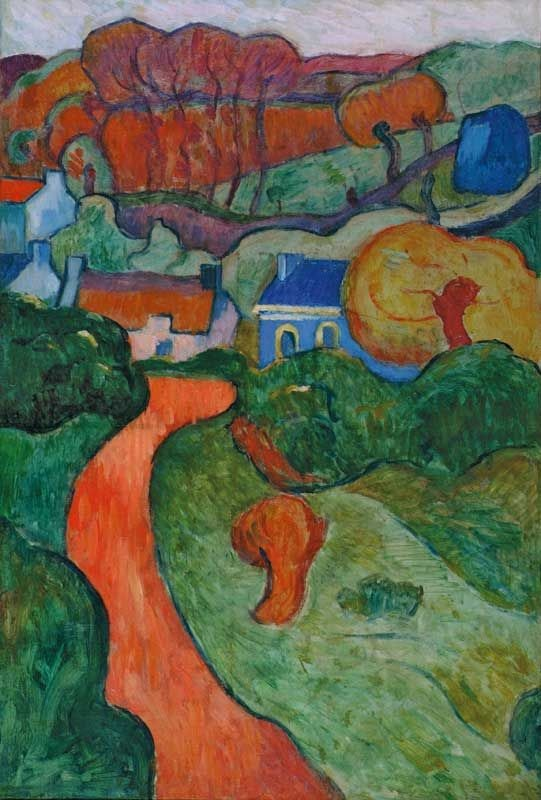
La route vers (1892)

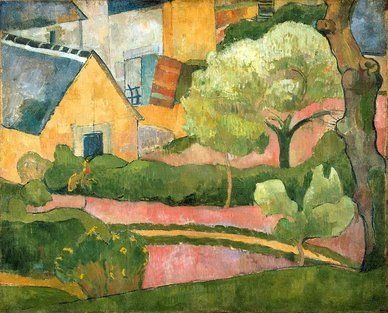
Pouldu (1892)

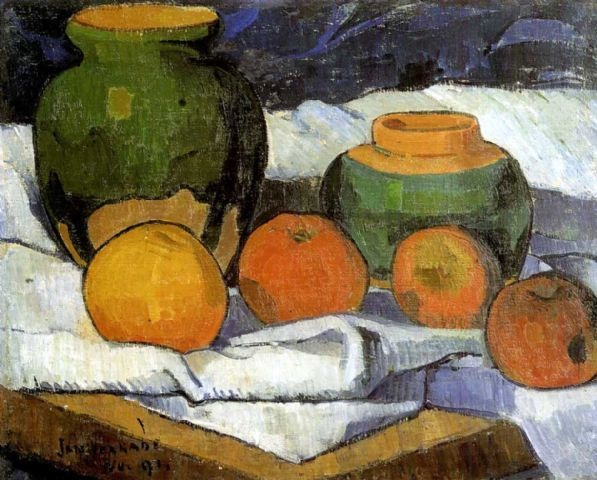
Still life with apples (c. 1891)

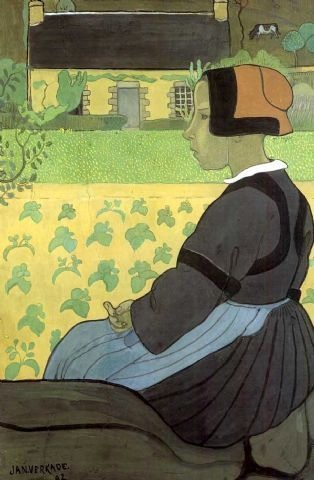
Peasant woman of St. Nolff (1892)

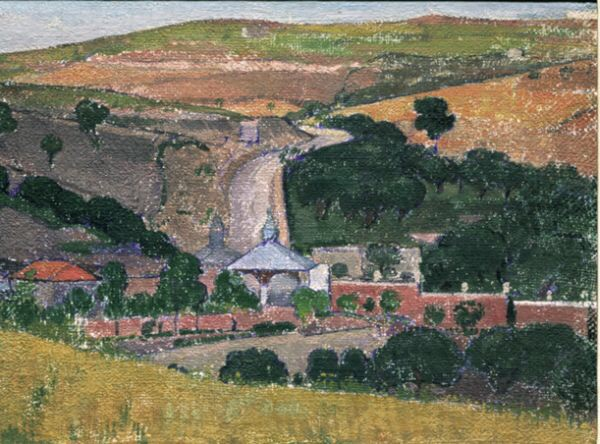
Ghetsemani (1909–1913)

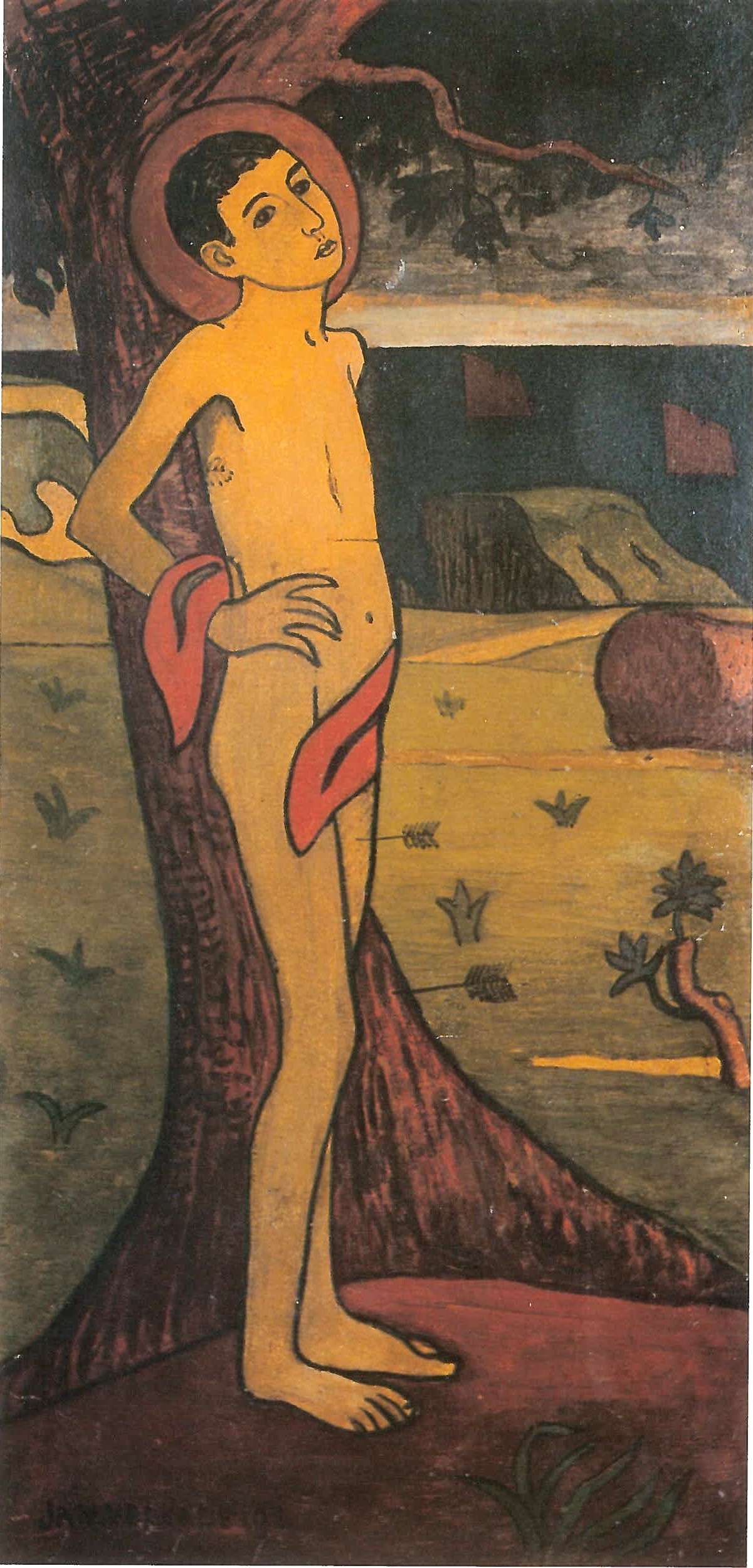
St. Sebastian (1892)

== Resources ==
- Boyle-Turner, Caroline: 'Jan Verkade: Hollandse volgeling van Gauguin, with contributions by Adolf Smitmans, J. A. van Beers and Tim Huisman, Waanders, Zwolle & Rijksmuseum Vincent van Gogh, Amsterdam (exh. 11 March - 21 May), 1989 ISBN 90-6630-171-6
- Frèches-Thory, Claire, & Perucchi-Petry, Ursula, ed.: Die Nabis: Propheten der Moderne, Kunsthaus Zürich & Grand Palais, Paris & Prestel, Munich 1993 ISBN 3-7913-1969-8 (German), (French)
- Hillert, Andreas: Anny Schröder: Leben und Werk einer Künstlerin zwischen Wiener Werkstätte, drittem Reich und Postmoderne (LIT Verlag, Münster 2014), 'Chapter IV: Anny Schröders Weg zurück zum christlichem Glauben: Begegnungen mit Pater Willibrord Verkade', pp. 104-126.
- Petraccaro-Goertsches, Jessica: 'Jan Verkade alias Pater Willibrord. Die Münchner Studienzeit eines Beuroner Künstlermönchs' in Stimmen der Zeit 140, Part 7 (2015), pp. 455–466.
- Smitmans, Jan: 'Pater Willibrord Jan Verkade OSB: Kunst, jenseits von Natur und Gesetz', in Erbe und Auftrag 75 (Kunstverlag, Beuron 1999).
