= Alexander Vakoulsky =

Russian-Dutch conductor (1949–2019)

Alexander Dmitriyevich Vakoulsky
- Александр Дмитриевич Вакульский
- Born: January 1, 1949; Iglinsky District, Bashkortostan, Russia
- Died: July 11, 2019 (aged 70)
- Education: Saint Petersburg Conservatory
- Occupation: Conductor

Alexander Dmitriyevich Vakoulsky (Russian: Александр Дмитриевич Вакульский; January 1, 1949 in Iglinsky District, Bashkortostan, Russia - July 11, 2019) was a Russian-Dutch conductor who was influenced by Yevgeny Mravinsky and Yevgeny Svetlanov.

== Biography ==
Vakoulksy was educated by Nikolay Rabinovich and Jeffrey Livine at the Saint Petersburg Conservatory from which he graduated with honours. In 1975 he made his conducting debut with La Traviata, but was forced to relocate to the Netherlands next year. After emigration to the Netherlands he became a conductor of the Dutch Radio Corporation the directors of which were Edward Downs and Kirill Kondrashin. For a short time, he worked as a principal conductor of the National Youth Orchestra and then later worked at the Amsterdam Symphony Orchestra for twenty years. Since 1993, he has recorded works by Claude Debussy, Antonín Dvořák, Maurice Ravel, Ottorino Respighi, and Robert Schumann which were published by the Golden Music Fund of Radio Russia. From 1995 to 2000 he worked at the State Academic Symphony Orchestra of the Russian Federation, and prior to it worked at the Nizhny Novgorod Philharmonic as well as the Turku Philharmonic Orchestra in Finland. At the beginning of the 21st century, he received the highest honour in his nation, the State Prize.

Besides being a conductor in the Netherlands, he also conducted Russian, including Moscow and Saint Petersburg Philharmonic Orchestras and also French orchestras such as French Radio Philharmonic Orchestra, Lillian National Orchestra, Parisian Chamber Orchestra, and National Opera House of Montpellier. He also worked with such well-known musicians as Evgeny Kissin, Yefim Bronfman, Boris Berezovsky, Vadim Repin, Victor Lieberman and Plamena Mangova. In 2010 he performed Giuseppe Verdi's Aida at the French stadium where 55,000 people came to watch him. On October 16, 2013 he along with Narek Hakhnazaryan have performed Rachmaninoff's Symphony No. 3 and Alexander Glazunov's suite from Raymonda ballet at the Moscow City Symphony Orchestra which was dedicated to 85th anniversary of Yevgeny Svetlanov He planned to perform his concerts in Brazil, Denmark, France, and Russia while his previous concerts were in Belgium, Spain, and Switzerland.
