= Zaans Museum =

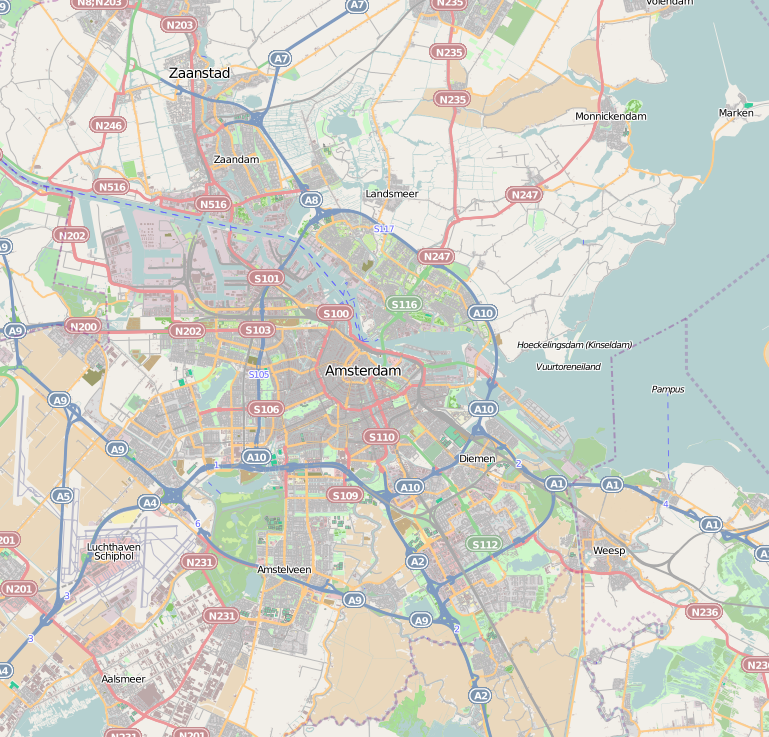
- Location in the greater Amsterdam area
- Established: 1994
- Location: Zaanse Schans; Zaandam, Netherlands
- Coordinates: 52.473333°N 4.822222°E
- Type: Industrial heritage museum
- Visitors: 56,498 (2013)
- Director: Jan Hovers
- President: P. W. Middelhoven
- Curator: Hester Wandel
- Website: www.zaansmuseum.nl

Zaans Museum (Dutch pronunciation: [ˈzaːns myˈzeːjʏm]) is a museum in Zaandam, Netherlands, located at the Zaanse Schans. It opened in 1998 to preserve and protect the heritage of the Zaan area. In 2009, the museum was extended with the addition of the Verkade Experience.

In 2016, the Zaans Museum opened three locations with living history at the Zaanse Schans: the Cooperage, the Jisper House, and the Weaver's House. Another annex of the Zaans Museum is the Tsar Peter House in the centre of Zaandam.

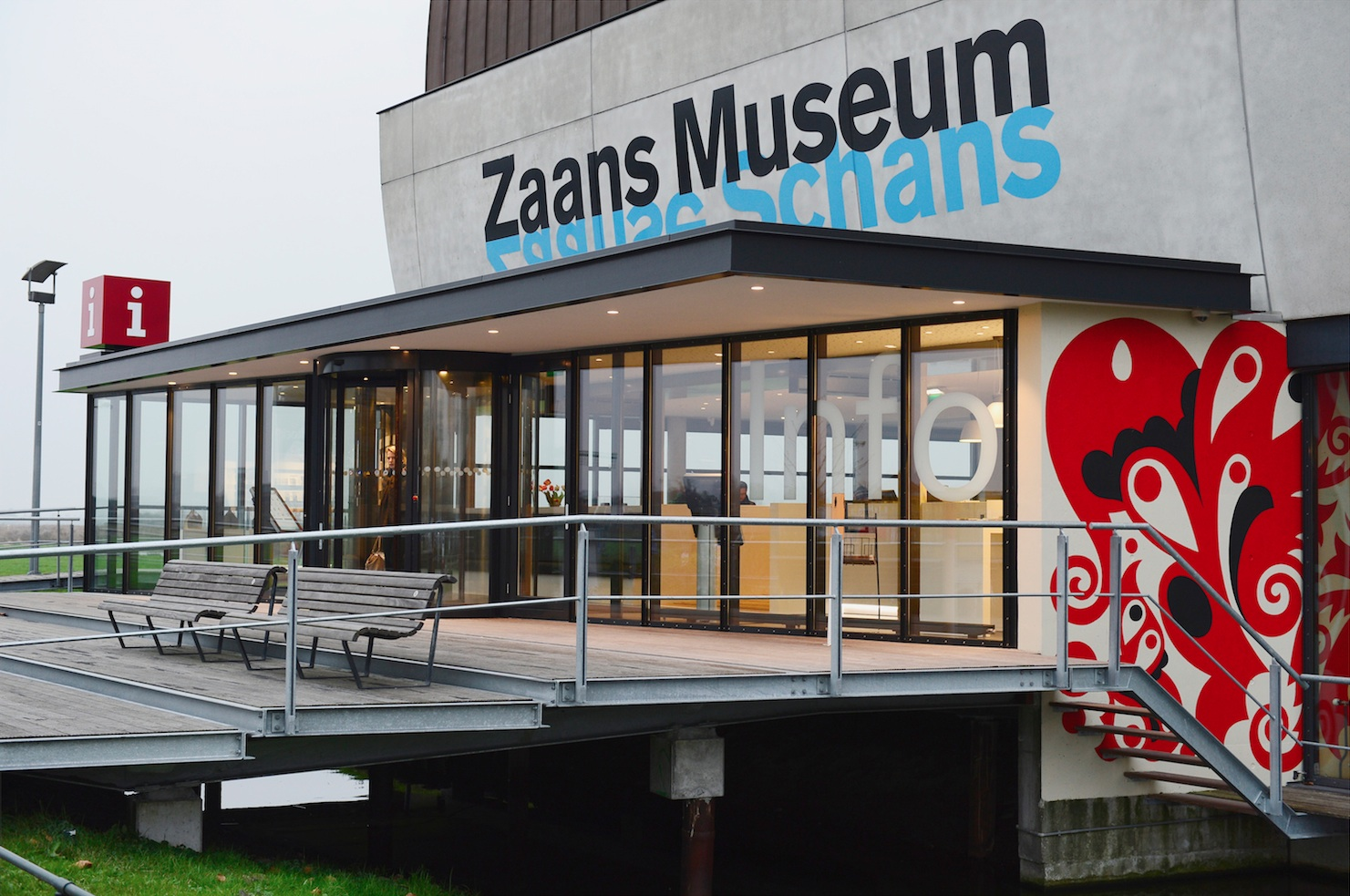
Zaans Museum - Entrance

The museum houses cultural-historical and regional collections examining the residential and industrial culture. In 2015, the museum acquired a painting from the Zaan period (4 June – 8 October 1871) of the French impressionist painter Claude Monet, entitled 'The Voorzaan and the Westerhem'.

The Zaans Museum is both physically connected with the Zaanse Schans and connected in terms of its exhibits. It sets itself the objective of offering extra depth to tourist visits to the Zaanse Schans by linking the archetypal image of 'Holland' with the factual history of the Zaan region.

== Collection ==
The museum is home to cultural-historical and regional collections. It is based on the collection of the Vereniging tot Instandhouding en Uitbreiding der Zaanlandse Oudheidkundige Verzameling Jacob Honig Janszoon Junior (Society for the Preservation and Expansion of the Zaan Region Antiquarian Collection Jacob Honig Janszoon Junior). The Zaans Museum has two sub-collections: residential culture and industrial culture. Within the residential culture collection, the museum displays the traditional regional costume, Zaan-style painted furniture, and tools and utensils found in Zaandam homes. The industrial collection comprises heritage originating from major Zaan-based companies such as Verkade, Bruynzeel, Honig, Albert Heijn, and Lassie.

== Locations and exhibitions ==
The permanent collection of the Zaans Museum currently comprises five exhibitions: ‘De Zaanstreek maakt het’ (The Zaan region really makes it), ‘Typisch Zaans’ (Typical of the Zaan region), ‘Monet en het Zaanse Landschap’ (Monet and the Zaan landscape), 'Monumenten Spreken' (Monuments Speak - The Zaan region in the Second World War), and the ‘Verkade Experience’. A new introduction for the permanent collection - in which ‘Old Holland’ is explained as an important reason for tourists to visit the Zaanse Schans - is currently being prepared and is expected to open in 2017/2018. At the Zaans Schans, the Zaans Museum manages three external locations: the Weaver's House, the Cooperage, and the Jisper House.

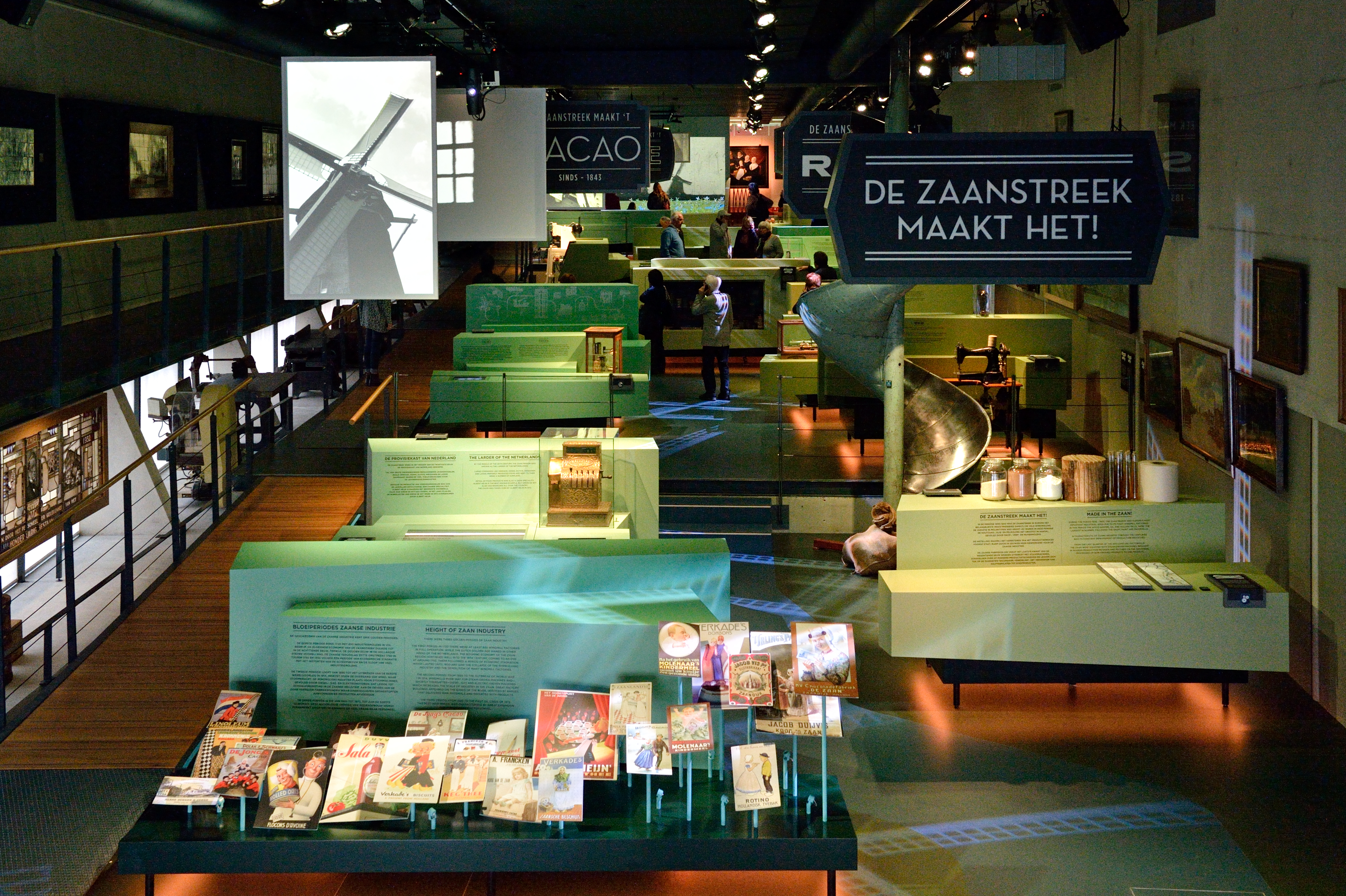
De Zaanstreek maakt het - The Zaan region really makes it

=== De Zaanstreek maakt het ===
The permanent exhibition ‘De Zaanstreek maakt het’ (The Zaan region really makes it) presents the history of industry in the Zaan region. In the seventeenth and eighteenth centuries, the Zaan region was well known for its large number of windmills and shipyards. In the nineteenth century, the appearance of the Zaan region changed as numerous factories were built along the banks of the River Zaan. The construction of the North Sea Canal (1876), a seaport, a lock, and railway lines at the beginning of the twentieth century allowed the Zaan factories and food industry to develop between 1918 and 1965 into the most important and best-known sector of Dutch industry. The Zaan region is also known as 'the larder of the Netherlands'.

=== Verkade Experience ===
The collection in the Verkade Experience is made up of the company collection of the Verkade family. This collection comprises photos, displays, packaging, posters, and three working production lines for chocolate, biscuits, and tea light candles. There is also a 'treasury' where the original watercolours for the Verkade picture-card albums are on display.

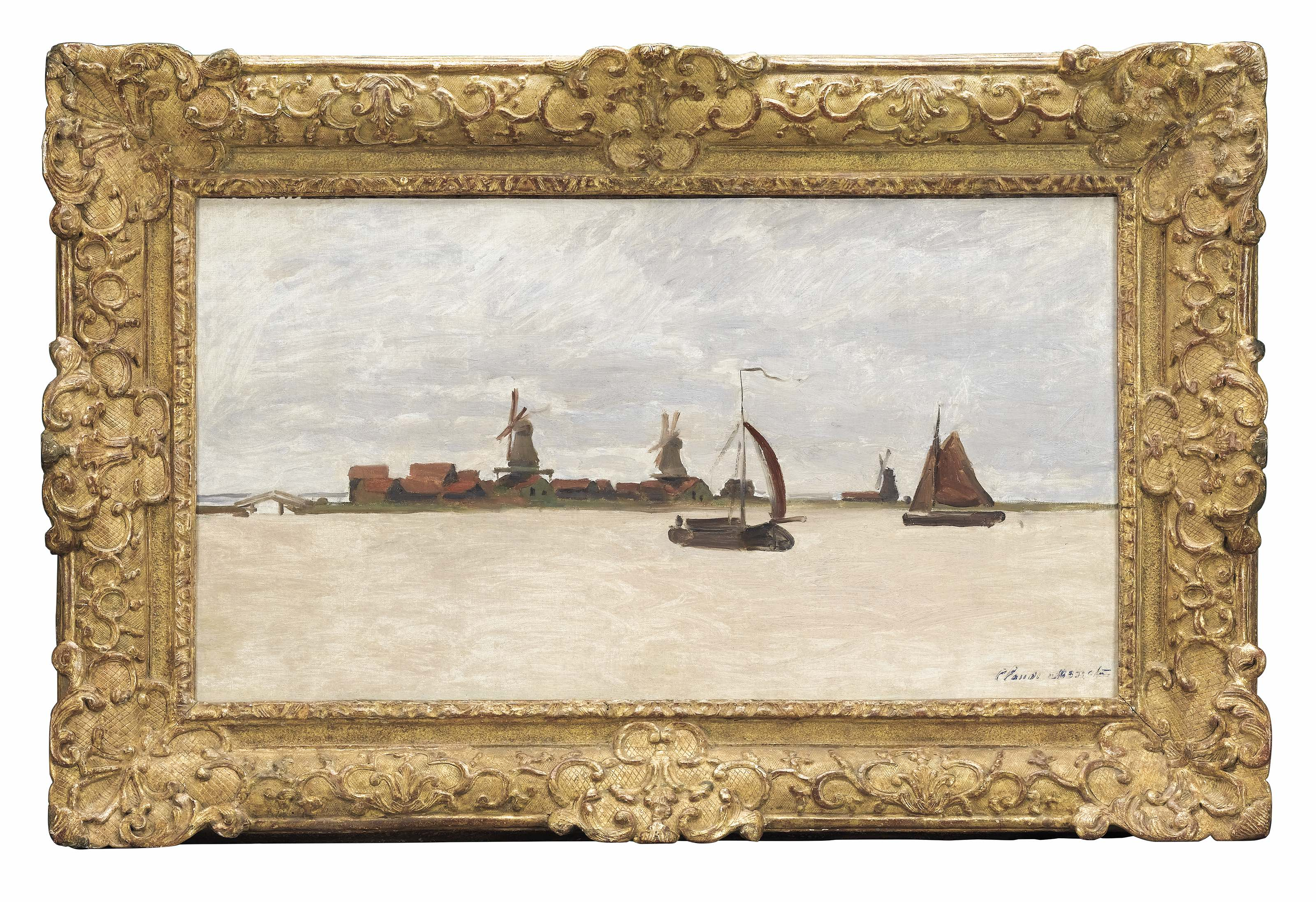
Claude Monet, De Voorzaan en de Westerhem, 1871 (collection Zaans Museum)

=== Monet and the Zaan scenery ===
In 2015, the museum acquired a painting from the Zaan period (4 June – 8 October 1871) of the French impressionist painter Claude Monet, entitled 'The Voorzaan and the Westerhem'. The scene shows a view of the Voorzaan, the section of the river to the south of the locks in the centre of Zaandam. Ships are sailing around the island Westerhem. On the island we see the sawmills turning: de Bakker, de Roode Leeuw and De Notenboom. Monet painted three different versions of this scene. Later, this type of 'series painting' came to be known as one of the hallmarks of Impressionism, a style with which Monet was experimenting in the Zaan region. He wrote the following in a letter to his friend, the painter Camille Pissarro: ‘Zaandam is quite remarkable and there is enough to paint for a lifetime. Houses in all colours, hundreds of mills, and delightful boats.’

'The Voorzaan and the Westerhem' by Monet has been included in the presentation at the Zaans Museum on the Zaan landscape as a source of inspiration for artists. In addition, all 25 paintings and nine sketches that Monet produced in Zaandam in 1871 can be seen in full-size in an interactive presentation. The painting has been included in the permanent paintings exhibition and portrait gallery of Zaan residents. (The painting does not really fit into this category but takes pride of place beside this presentation.) The collection of portraits comprises pictures of members of Zaan families who were successful in one of the typical local industries of the Zaan region, as well as mayors, manufacturers, and artists. In addition, the museum has a few unusual pieces by famous and less well-known Zaan residents.

=== Typical Zaans ===
The permanent exhibition ‘Typisch Zaans’ (Typical of the Zaan region) shows a reconstruction of an exhibition from 1874, which forms the basis for the current collection of the Zaans Museum. Local historians and collectors recorded the history of the Zaan region in books and collections in order to preserve the region's heritage. The original exhibition of ‘Zaanlandsche Oudheden en Merkwaardigheden’ (Zaan antiquities and curiosities) was held at the Zaandam city hall in August and September 1874. A modern reconstruction of this nineteenth-century exhibition shows what the people of the time considered to be typical of the Zaan region.

=== Monuments Speak ===
The exhibition ‘Monumenten spreken’ (Monuments speak) tells the story of the Second World War in the Zaan region. It is the story behind the 28 war memorials and resistance memorials found in the Zaan region. The monuments refer to events from the Second World War. Here you can see 28 mini-documentaries, featuring eyewitnesses talking about these events. The documentaries have been produced by Stichting Monumenten Spreken (the Monuments Speak Foundation).

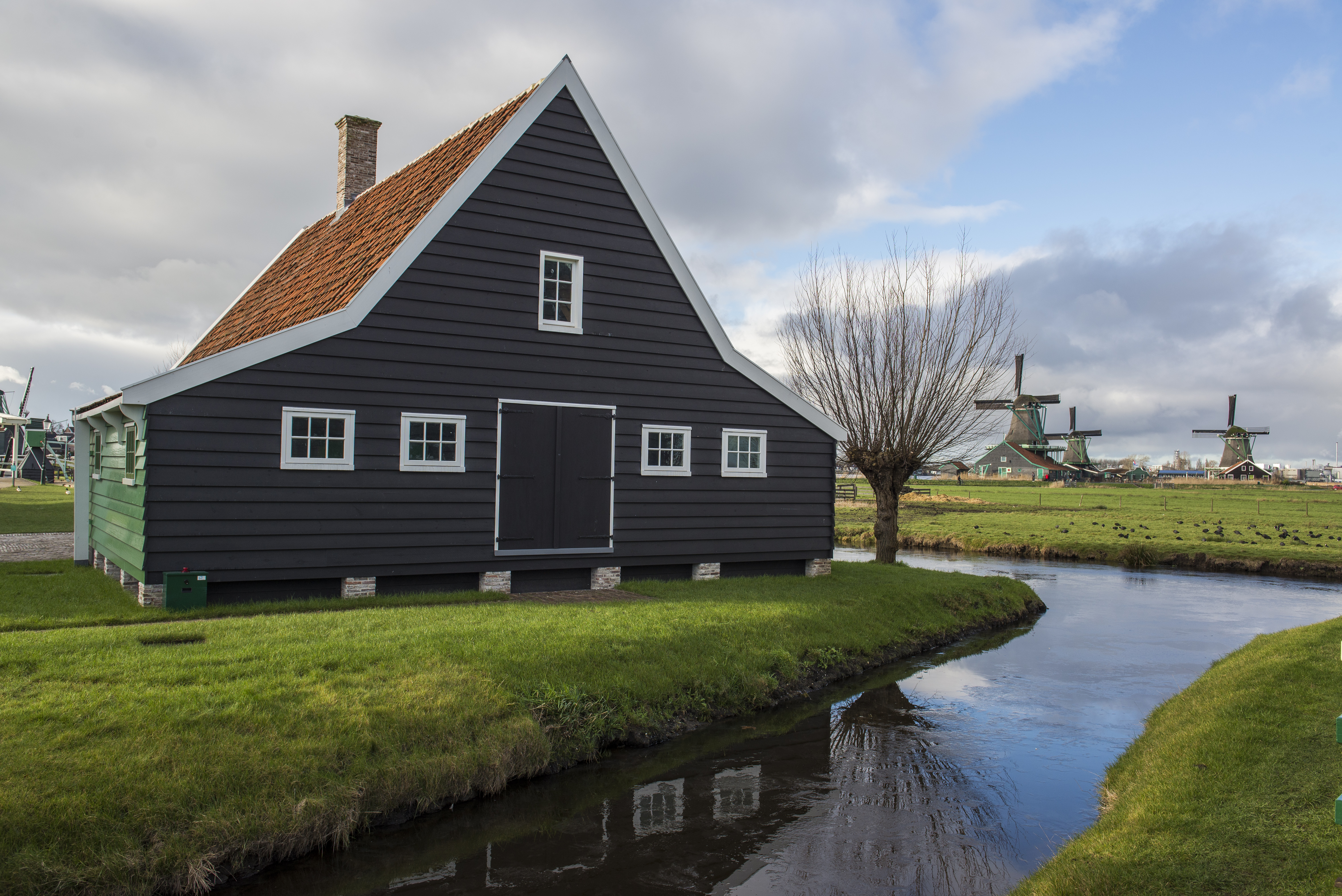
The Weaver's House - Zaans Museum

=== The Weaver's House ===
The Weavers House is one of the locations of the Zaans Museum at the Zaanse Schans. The focus at the Weaver's House is on the craft of weaving sailcloth in the nineteenth century. Two families lived here in the eighteenth century and there were five looms. The current exhibition shows the residential situation of one family with two looms. The Weaver's House served as a weaving mill until the start of the twentieth century. At that time, the house stood on Dorpsstraat in nearby Assendelft. In 2015, the house was reconstructed at the Zaanse Schans.

=== The Cooperage ===
The Cooperage is one of the locations of the Zaans Museum at the Zaanse Schans. The focus at the Cooperage is on the craft of coopery, or barrel making, circa 1960. The interior of the Cooperage came from the cooper's and barrel trading company S.R. Tiemstra & Sons from Oostzanerwerf in the north of Amsterdam. Upon his death, the last cooper - Jaap Tiemstra - bequeathed the entire cooperage and its contents to the Zaans Museum. The barrels produced served as packaging material for butter, milk, vinegar, oil, fish, fruit, vegetables, jenever (Dutch gin), rum, and all kinds of beer and wine.

=== The Jisper House ===
The Jisper House is one of the locations of the Zaans Museum at the Zaanse Schans. At the Jisper House, a fisherman's cottage originating from the village of Jisp, the Zaans Museum gives an impression of the life of a fisherman's wife before the Industrial Revolution midway through the nineteenth century. Children and adults alike can take a step back in time by dressing up in traditional Zaan costumes from that period. The cottage is a replica. The original dates from 1860 and can be seen at the Zuiderzeemuseum in Enkhuizen.

=== Honig Breet House ===
Part of the collection of the Zaans Museum is on display at the Honig Breet House. At the Honig Breet House, visitors can experience how a family of merchants and paper makers lived in the Zaan region in 1830. The museum is situated on Lagedijk in Zaandijk.

=== Czar Peter House ===
The Czar Peter House (Netherlands) in the centre of Zaandam is one of the oldest wooden houses in the Netherlands. It was built as a labourer's cottage in 1632 using old ship wood. The Russian Tsar Peter the Great lodged in this little wooden house in 1697 when he came to learn the shipwright's trade. In 1823, a shell was built around the house to protect it. The current stone shell dates from 1895. Many people, including Russian Tsars, Dutch monarchs, and even Napoleon, have paid a visit to the Tsar Peter House. The countless names that have been written on and scratched into the windows and wooden walls are reminders of these visitors. The Czar Peter House is an annex of the Zaans Museum.

== Building and situation ==
The Zaans Museum has been housed in a building with a contemporary design measuring 16,500m3 since it opened. The building was designed by the architect Cor van Hillo. The museum was extended in 2009 with a new wing - the Verkade Experience - opening on 11 March 2009. This wing houses the company collection of Verkade. The Zaans Museum is situated at the Zaanse Schans on the Kalverpolder, a nature reserve operated by Staatsbosbeheer (a Dutch government organization for Forestry and the management of nature reserves).

In 2001, the museum was given an honourable mention during the presentation of the annual European Museum of the Year Award;. The jury had particular praise for the modern and open architecture of the building, the situation of the building in relation to the historic reconstruction at the Zaanse Schans, the educational programmes, and the presentation of the permanent collection. The lighting design in the presentation also won two prizes: Edison Awards. and the International Illumination Design Award 2001.

== Future exhibitions and locations ==
=== Old Holland ===
A new introduction for the permanent collection - in which ‘Old Holland’ is explained as an important reason for tourists to visit the Zaanse Schans - is currently being prepared and is expected to open in 2017/2018.

=== Hembrug Museum ===
In mid-2016, the Hembrug Museum will be brought under the auspices of the Zaans Museum. Over the course of 2017, part of the collection will be shown in two electricity substations on the Hembrug site. The monumental buildings, objects, photos, films, and documents show the history of the former Artillerie Inrichtingen (government ordnance works) and the Hembrug site as the military, logistical heart of the Defence Line of Amsterdam. For many years, it was the largest employer in Zaanstad.

=== Kunsthal Zaandam ===
In cooperation with the Municipality of Zaanstad, the Zaans Museum is developing an art exhibition venue in the historic city centre of Zaandam. The content of the exhibition venue will focus on international visitors in particular, displaying typically Dutch works of art that do justice to the archetypal image of 'Holland' .

== See also ==
- List of food and beverage museums
