= Verkade =

Dutch manufacturing company

Koninklijke Verkade N.V.
- Verkade logo, pre-1994
- Type: Naamloze vennootschap
- Founded: Zaandam (North Holland), Netherlands (2 May 1886)
- Founder: Ericus Verkade
- Headquarters: Zaandam, Netherlands
- Products: Chocolate, rusk, cookies
- Owner: Pladis
- Number of employees: 550
- Website: verkade.nl

Royal Verkade (Dutch: Koninklijke Verkade) is a Dutch biscuit and confectionery company owned by Pladis, the snack food subsidiary of Turkish conglomerate Yildiz Holding. The company is headquartered in Zaandam and was one of the oldest existing family companies in the Netherlands. In November 2014, Verkade was acquired by Turkish conglomerate Yıldız Holding as part of its acquisition of United Biscuits. In January 2016, Verkade became part of Pladis when Yıldız Holding consolidated United Biscuits with Ülker, Godiva and DeMet's Candy Company to form a new global snack food subsidiary. It was founded in 1886 by Ericus Verkade to make mostly bread and rusk, and expanded to produce cookies, sweets, and, especially, chocolates.

== History ==
The company was first named "De Ruyter" for a mill in Zaandam which milled flour—the original "ruiter" ("horse rider") was on the company logo until 1994, when it was removed to make way for a newly designed logo, intended to give the company and its products a more contemporary look. The horseman is still found on Verkade rusk, which currently is made by the competitor, the Bolletje factory in Almelo, using the Verkade recipe. The company acquired the right to bear the "royal" mark in their name in 1950, and employs some 450 people in Zaandam. The last members of the Verkade family, Ericus's great-grandsons Erik and Arnold, left the company in 1992.

Commercial success came about also through marketing, starting in 1906, when the company began issuing picture cards with its products, which could be collected in albums. Co Verkade, a grandson of Ericus, was instrumental in this strategy, and the albums, most of them written by Jac. P. Thijsse were especially popular. The albums generated a kind of collection mania among the Dutch population before World War II: 27 albums were made, a total of 3.2 million copies; another source lists 28 albums and 362 million cards distributed over 30 years.

== The women of Verkade ==
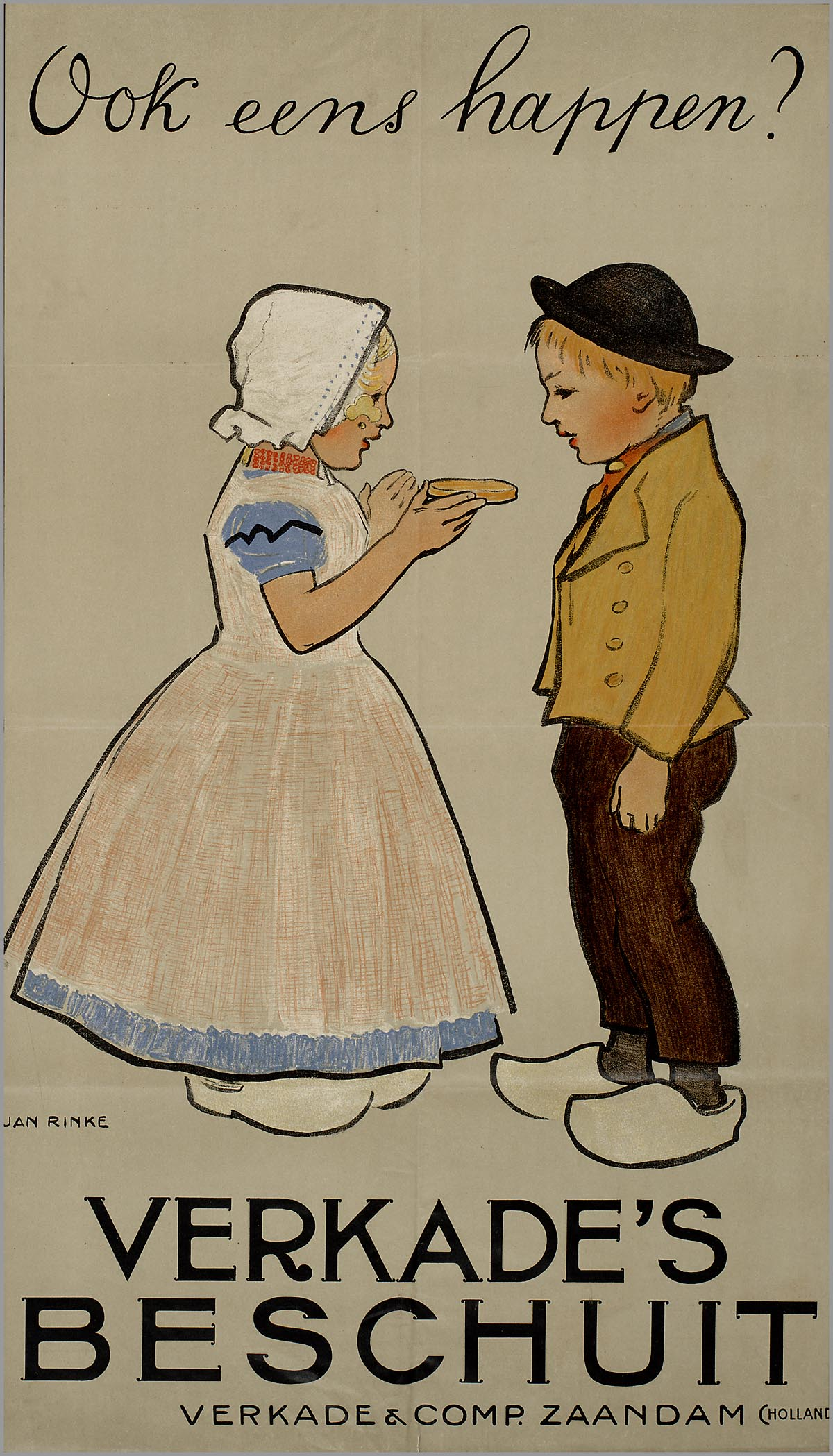
Advertisement for Verkade rusk, ca. 1900, by Jan Rinke.

In the company's early days, the main part of the workforce consisted of young women who walked in their company uniform to work; these "Verkade girls" (De meisjes van Verkade or Verkadevrouwen, also Ruytermeisjes, for the company's earlier name) are occasionally revived for ceremonial purposes, such as when Queen Beatrix opened the Verkade pavilion (which houses corporate art owned by the Verkade family) in the Zaans Museum. The Zaanstreek (roughly, the area on the river the Zaan) was a regional center of industry, and women workers were employed at many of the factories in the area, including Honig, Hille, and Albert Heijn.

The history of these factory workers was published in Ruytermeisjes and Verkadevrouwen in 1997; oral historians Ineke Hogema and Ivonne van der Padt describe the women and their situation. Many of them came from the poor areas of Amsterdam (starting in 1911), and most talked about the pleasant social interactions: "We sang all the time," one of them said, and they were allowed to chat during work. Distinct regional and class differences were noted: girls from Amsterdam (specifically the Jordaan, a working-class neighborhood) were deemed to be very outspoken, even vulgar, compared to their counterparts from Zaandam; some of the girls were rumored to have undressed a train conductor between Amsterdam and Zaandam. For Verkade, the benefit of hiring female workers was twofold: women were thought to have more delicate hands and be better at packaging brittle materials such as cookies and rusk, and they commanded lower wages than their male counterparts. In a tradition of paternalism, the company apparently felt a kind of responsibility toward the younger girls, who often came from uneducated backgrounds; after hours, they were offered classes in cooking and sewing. The girls usually quit their jobs when they got married (in fact, company policy often dictated that they be fired; unmarried women over 30 had to have made promotion or lose their jobs), and often thought of their old jobs and colleagues with nostalgia.

After World War II Verkade found itself competing for scarce labor, and it drastically changed its policies, now employing married and older women. It began to run advertisements in the Amsterdam public transportation system: Meisjes komt werken bij Verkade en neem vooral je moeder mee ("Girls, come work at Verkade, and please bring your mother"); in 1961, it opened a daycare facility, one of the first Dutch companies to do so. In the 1960s and 1970s, Verkade also benefited from the influx of migrant workers, who were just coming onto the Dutch labor market, and began hiring and employing the wives of those workers. The end of the Verkademeisjes came in the 1970s and 1980s, when machines started doing the work formerly done by delicate women's fingers.

The Zaans Museum has a section dedicated to the girls. It is sponsored for an amount of €60,000 by PDZ, one of the country's largest temp agencies, which was one of the main providers of women to Verkade's workforce since the 1960s. Today's Verkademeisjes are a group of singers/actresses founded in 2005 who have revived one notable tradition of the original Verkade girls: singing cheerful songs. Dutch author and songwriter Willem Wilmink named one of his collections for them, Brief van een Verkademeisje en andere liedjes.
