= Czar Peter House (Netherlands) =

Historical building in Zaandam, the Netherlands

Coordinates: 52.43733°N 4.823417°E

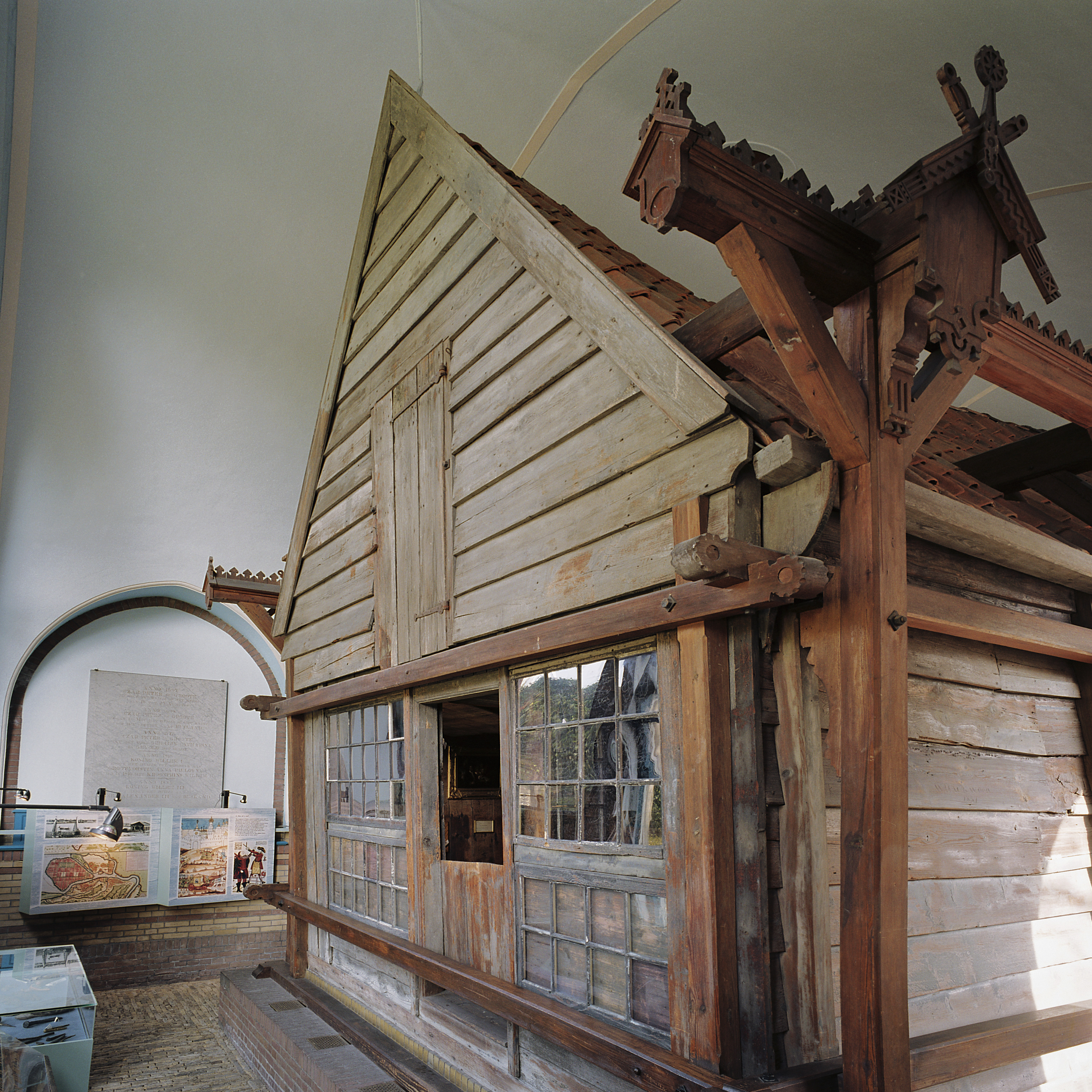
Czar Peter House in 2002

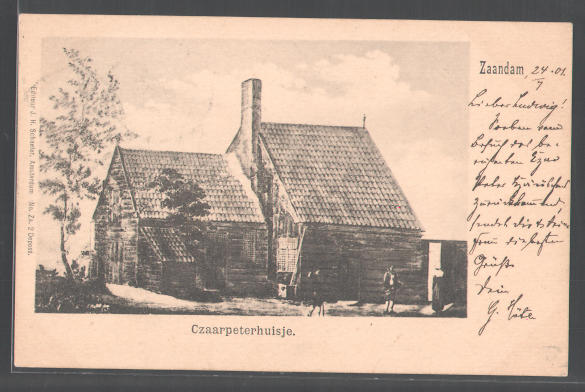
1901 postcard image of the house

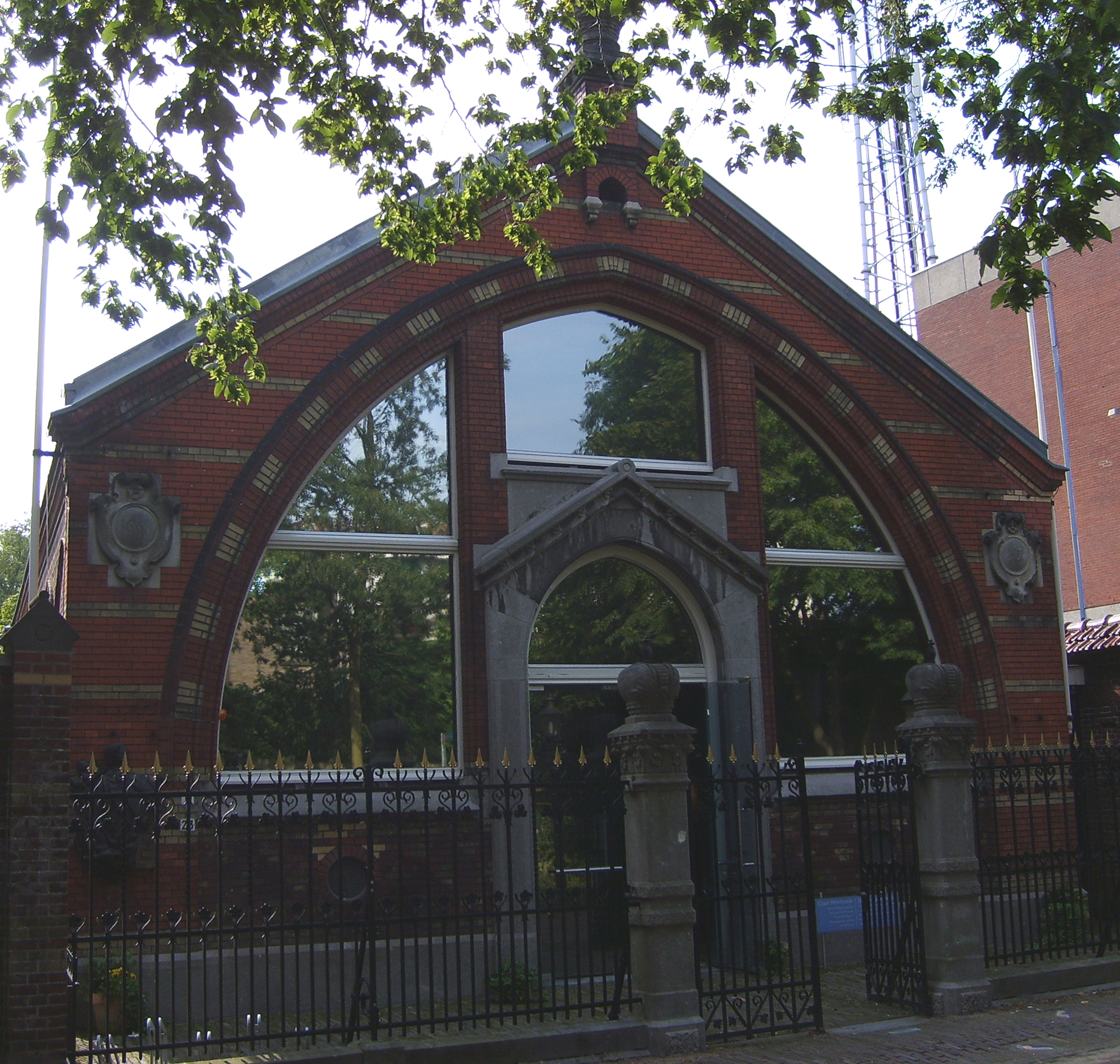
Stone cover of the Czar Peter House

The Czar Peter House (Dutch: Czaar Peterhuisje) is a historical building in Zaandam, the Netherlands. It is best known as the place where Tsar Peter I of Russia resided in 1697 during his Grand Embassy. The building was constructed in 1632.

Peter had met the Zaandam blacksmith and craftsman Gerrit Kist when Kist had worked for the tsar in Moscow. Upon visiting the Zaanstreek, Peter insisted on staying with Kist in his home, despite Kist's protests that his house was a mere hovel, shared with the widow of one of his workers. The widow was paid to move out, and Peter spent a week as Kist's houseguest. The tsar was traveling incognito under the name Peter Michaeloff and while Kist did not reveal his guest's identity it did not take long for Peter to be recognized, making his observations difficult.

Peter wanted to learn more about the Dutch shipbuilding industry, and with this knowledge (and other knowledge acquired during the Grand Embassy) begin a period of modernization and growth in Russia. At this time, the Dutch Republic was one of the most developed countries in the world.

Although he remained at the house only a short time, he would return a number of times, the last in 1717.

In 1895, a new stone cover was built over the house to protect it; this was done by the architect Salm, best known for designing the Artis Aquarium in Amsterdam. The cover was added to the list of national monuments in 2001, meaning that the Czar Peter House is actually on the list twice, once for the original building and once for the renovation.

The house is part of the Zaans Museum and can be visited.
