= Ericus Verkade =

Dutch businessman (1835–1907)

Ericus Gerhardus Verkade
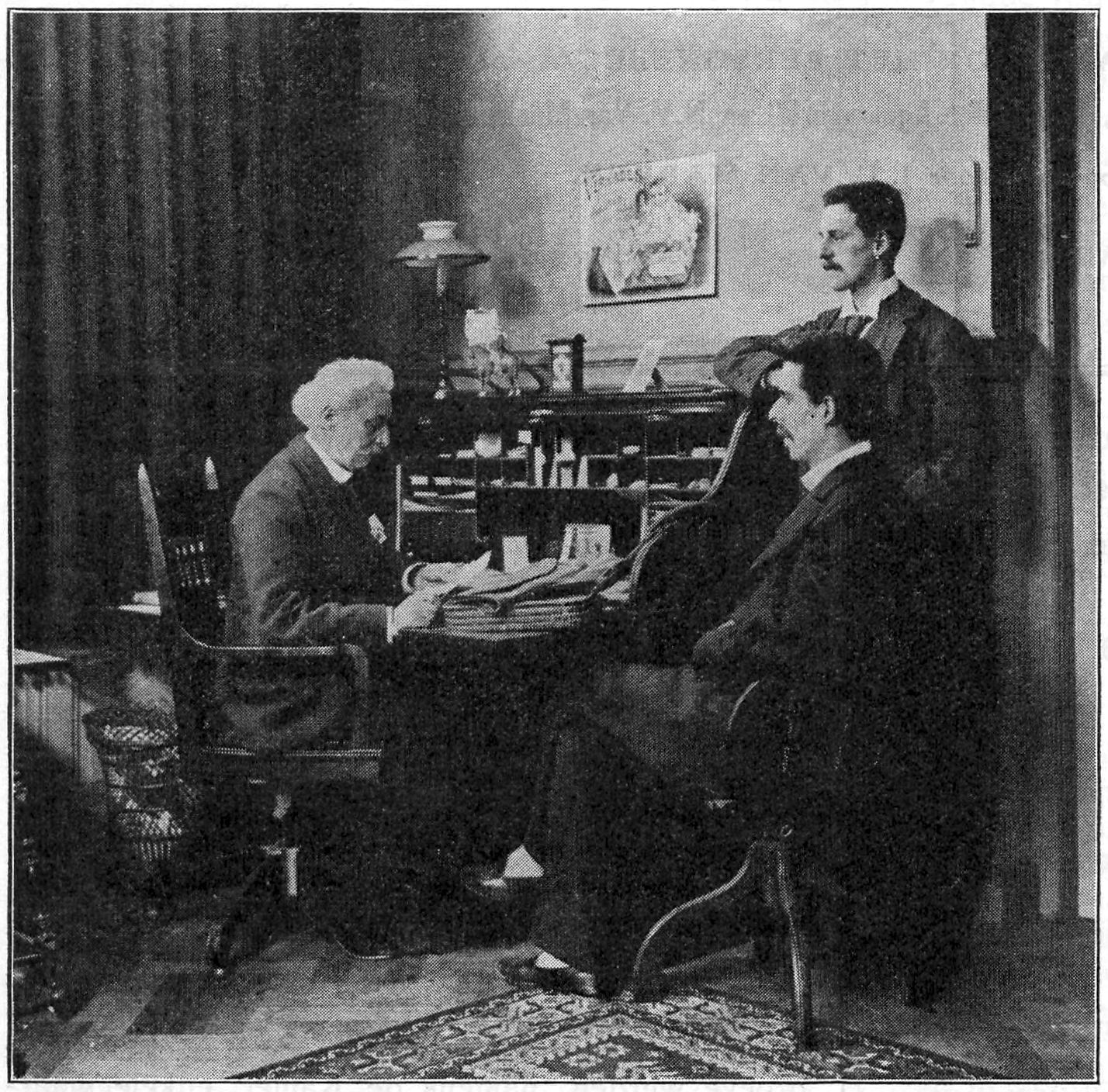
- E. G. Verkade Sr., E. G. Verkade Jr. en A. H. Verkade (standing) in 1896.
- Born: Ericus Gerhardus Verkade; 20 November 1835; Vlaardingen, Netherlands
- Died: 8 February 1907 (aged 71); Hilversum, Netherlands
- Known for: Founder of Verkade
- Spouse(s): Trijntje Smit (1857–1863); Eduarda Thalia Koning (1865–1907)

Ericus Gerhardus Verkade (20 November 1835 – 8 February 1907) was a Dutch businessman and the founder of the Verkade manufacturing company in 1886.

== Biography ==
Ericus Gerhardus Verkade was born on 20 November 1835 in Vlaardingen in the Netherlands. He was named after his father, the notary Ericus Gerhardus Verkade Sr (1801–1835), who died one month before he was born. Verkade's mother, Geertruida van Gelder, was from Wormerveer and moved her family back to her birthplace shortly after Ericus Jr's birth.

Soon after school, Verkade started a vegetable oil factory, which burned out in 1875. The next eight years he and his brother-in-law traded in grains. On 2 May 1886, he started a steam-powered bakery, a company he initially named "De Ruyter" for the first mill in Zaandam that milled flour—the original "ruiter" ("chevalier") was on the company logo until 1994. Verkade originally baked bread and rusk, but soon expanded to make cookies, chocolate, and snacks. Verkade became a household name in the Netherlands.

In 1857 in Zaandam, Verkade married Trijntje Smit, with whom he had a daughter. In 1865 he married Eduarda Thalia Koning (1841–1917), with whom he had seven children. His son Jan Verkade became a well-known Post-Impressionist artist. Jan was the twin brother of Ericus Gerhardus (1868–1927) who would take over his father's business.

Verkade died on 8 February 1907 in Hilversum in the Netherlands.
