= Dutch cuisine =

Culinary traditions of the Netherlands

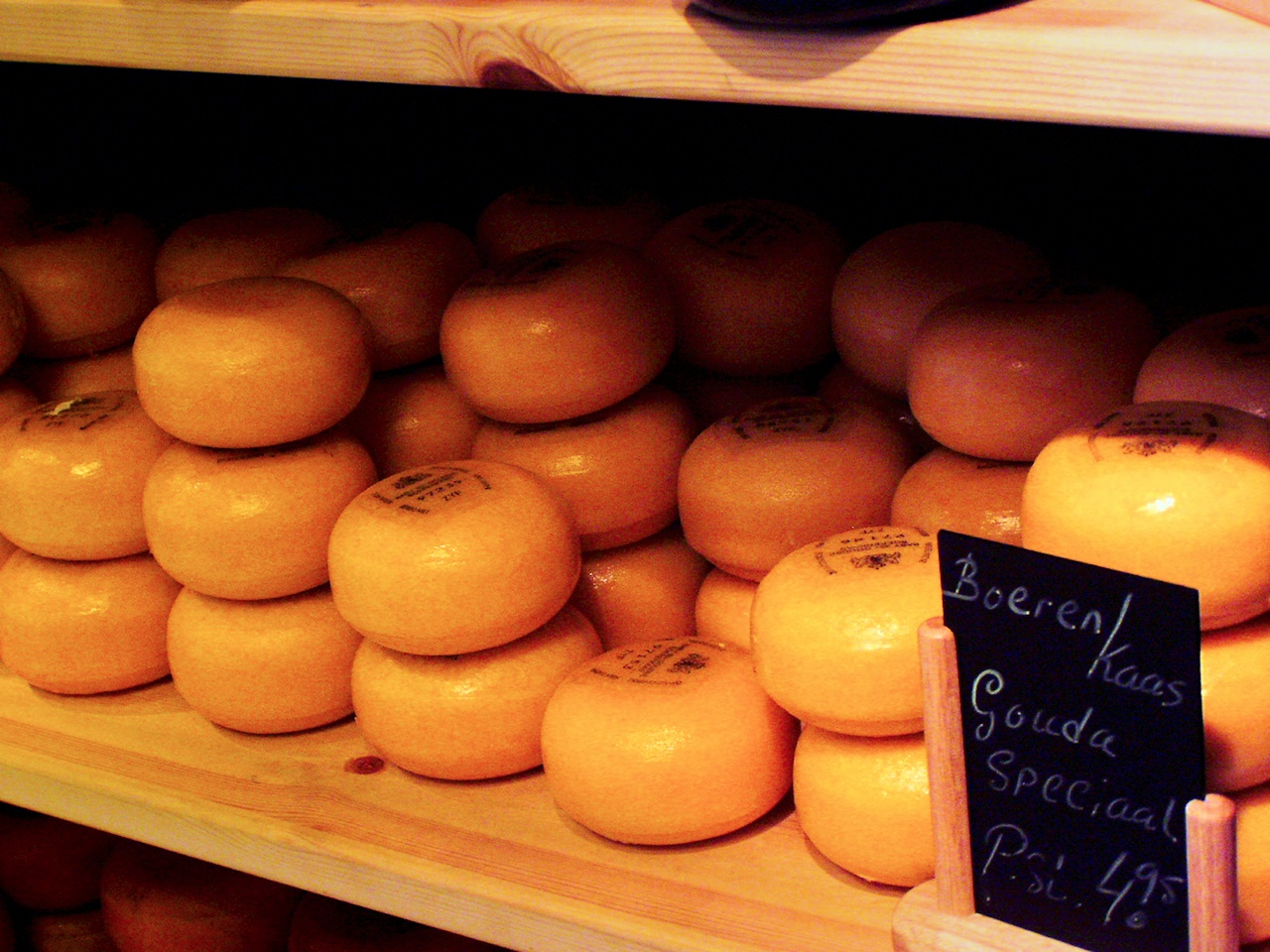
Gouda cheese

Dutch cuisine consists of the cooking traditions and practices of the Netherlands. The cuisine is shaped by its location on the fertile Rhine–Meuse–Scheldt delta at the North Sea, making fishing and farming major sources of income.The Dutch are known for their dairy products, especially butter and cheese. In the 17th and 18th centuries the Dutch ruled the spice trade, played a pivotal role in the global spread of coffee, and developed Dutch process chocolate. This was the technique of first removing fat from cocoa beans using a hydraulic press, creating cocoa powder, and then alkalizing it to make it less acidic and more palatable.

In the late 19th and early 20th centuries the Netherlands ranked as the world's second-largest exporter of agricultural products behind the United States. The Dutch became known "the feeders of the world," although some Dutch food, such as stamppot, was described as bland. However the cuisine of Dutch colonies (particularly Indonesian cuisine) has impacted on Dutch food as a whole. This is reflected in the country's 119 Michelin-starred restaurants.

Dutch cuisine can traditionally be divided in three regions. The northeast of the country is known for its meats and sausages (rookworst, metworst) and heavy rye bread, the west for fish (smoked eel, soused herring, kibbeling, mussels), spirits (jenever) and dairy-based products (stroopwafel, boerenkaas), and the south for stews (hachée), fruit products and pastry (Limburgse vlaai, apple butter, bossche bol). A peculiar characteristic for Dutch breakfast and lunch is the sweet bread toppings such as hagelslag, vlokken, and muisjes, and the Dutch are the highest consumers of liquorice in the world.

== History ==
=== 14th–16th centuries ===
Early cookbooks for the elite picture a homogeneous food culture across Europe. Differences were in the use of what was locally available; milk and butter—from the low-lying grasslands of Holland and Friesland—were used in the Netherlands, in comparison to bacon fat used in German countries and England, and oil in Southern Europe. Dutch butter and cheese continued to be famous products for centuries. The common people ate half-liquid brij or porridge, potage (consisting of root vegetables, peas, herbs, meat and fish) and soppe (vegetable/meat/fish paste, thickened with bread). The characteristically thick Dutch pea soup snert, of which a traditional rule of thumb holds that it should be thick enough for a wooden spoon to remain standing upright in the pot, was indebted to this medieval tradition.

Beer flavoured with gruit was the common drink as water was of poor quality, and was produced until the 14th century at the monasteries. The replacement of gruit for hop, a German innovation, extended shelf life, turning the Low Countries into a major beer exporter. It still is the largest beer exporter of Europe. Brand, established in 1349, is the country's oldest beer brand.

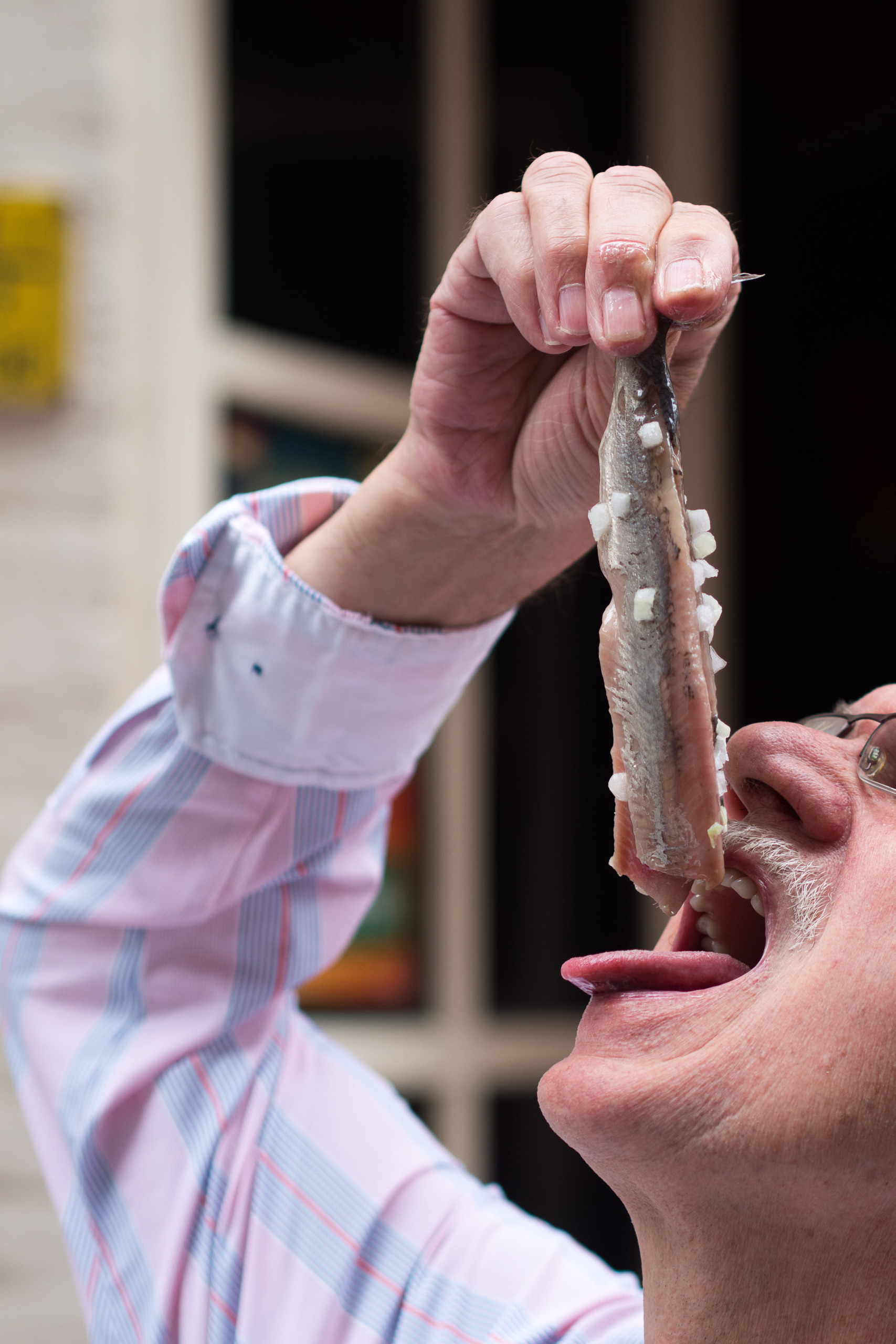
How Hollandse Nieuwe is eaten

In the 14th century gibbing was invented by Willem Beukelszoon, extending the shelf life of herring, making it possible to sail further and catch more. It created a booming export industry for and a monopoly in soused herring (Dutch: maatjesharing), and sat the foundation for the later seafaring and colonial Dutch Empire. The Dutch still celebrate Vlaggetjesdag (Flag Day) each spring, when fishermen go out to sea to capture the annual herring catch: Hollandse Nieuwe.

Vegetable Gardens were used by monasteries and later by castles for their own kitchens. Keukenhof (literally kitchen garden, but now a flower park) is such an example. Orchards for pears and apples connected to castles were later used for export and set off a Dutch horticulture tradition that remains to this day. In the castles, which have hunting grounds as well, haute cuisine began to emerge, and in 1510, the first Dutch-language cook book, aimed at the upper class, was printed in Brussels, called Een notabel boecxken van cokeryen (A notable book of cookery). It offers recipes for festivities, such as sauces, game, jellies, fish, meat, pies, eggs, dairy products, candied quinces and ginger, and contains one of the world's oldest known recipes for appeltaerten, apple pie. The recipes come from various sources, such as the French recipe book Le Viandier, reflecting the close ties between Dutch cuisine and the northern French cuisine, as the whole region was part of the Burgundian Netherlands, with a glamorous court life and lavish feasts. Traditional Dutch restaurants from the south are still referred to as Bourgondisch, alluding to the luxurious meals of yesteryear.

=== 17th century ===
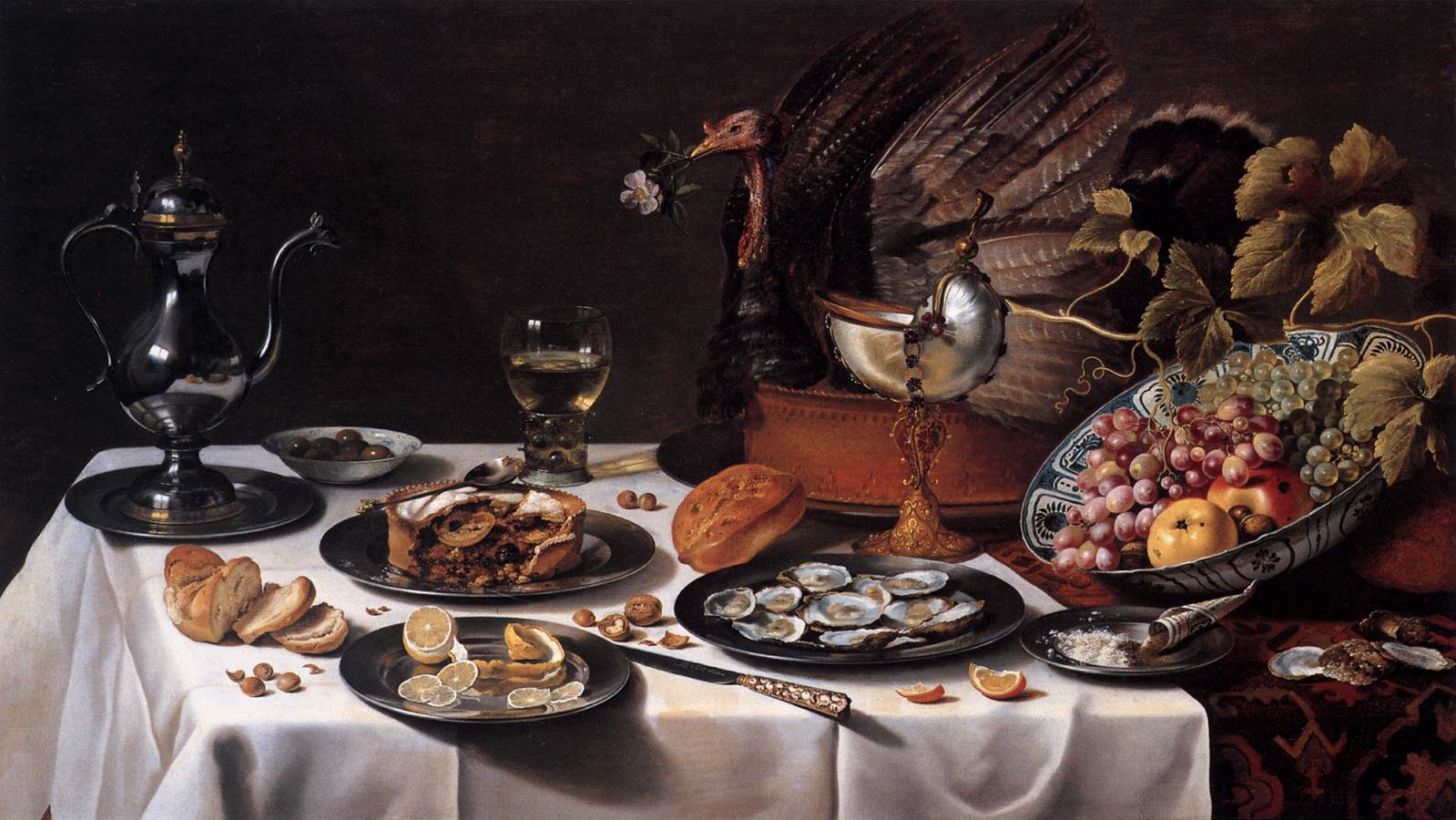
Still life with turkey pie, oysters, lemon and grapes by Pieter Claesz (1627).

As the Dutch Republic entered its Golden Age, lavish dishes became available to the wealthy middle class as well. The Dutch East India Company monopolised the trade in nutmeg, clove, mace and cinnamon, provided in 1661 more than half of the refined sugar consumed in Europe, and was the first to import coffee on a large scale to Europe, popularising the concept of coffee houses for the masses. Apart from coffee, tea became a daily commodity, which was served with candy, marzipan and cookies. The availability of cheaper spices resulted in a tradition of spiced cookies, called speculaas.

Initially spices were used to indicate social status, but this disappeared with the influx of spices in Dutch market, and it was the elite who were the first to ban the frequent use of spices. The cookbook De Verstandige Kok (or The Reasonable Chef), published in 1667, reflects this, and further more shows that meal started with green salads and cold or warm cooked vegetables with dressing, butter, herbs or edible flowers, and continued with numerous fish and meat dishes, including exotic ingredients such as dates, rice, cinnamon, ginger and saffron. Savoury tarts and pastries followed, and the meal ended with jellies, cheese, nuts and sweet pastries, washed down with hippocras, a sweet spiced wine. But in the Golden Age, the everyday meal of the ordinary Dutchman was still a humble affair of grain or legume pottage served with rye.

=== 18th–21st centuries ===
In the early 19th century, the staples for the working population, most of whom suffered from some form of malnutrition, were bread (rye bread in some areas) and potato (introduced from South America). A working-class family at this time may have also eaten pancakes, occasionally herring and other fish, fruit, vegetables, and little meat. They drank water of poor quality, watery coffee (or chicory), or tea. In some areas hot chocolate was consumed, but the most popular drinks were beer (predominantly in the Catholic south) and jenever, of which the consumption was twice that of the equivalent consumption of distilled spirits in neighbouring countries.

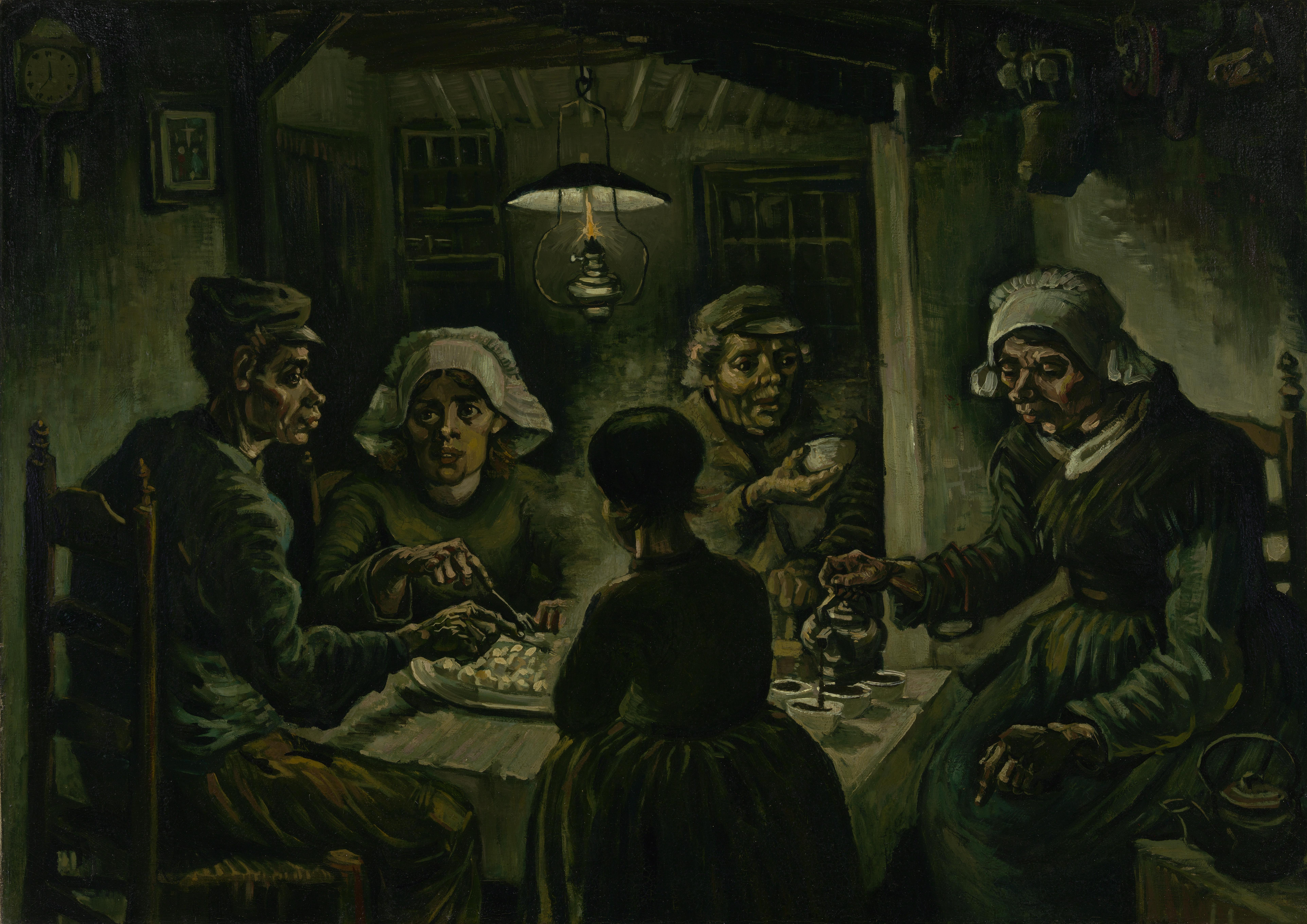
Vincent van Gogh, The Potato Eaters (1885): peasants from his home village Nuenen having dinner

In the 20th century, the availability of mass education meant that girls could be sent to the Huishoudschool (housekeeping school) to be taught to cook cheap and simple meals, leading to an increasingly uniform and plain Dutch diet. However, initially influenced by the eating culture of its colonies (particularly the Indonesian cuisine), and later by globalization, the diet changed significantly, and became cosmopolitan. Most international cuisines are represented in the major cities and there is a renewed interest in taste, which is reflected in the 119 Michelin-starred restaurants in the country.

== Origins ==
Dutch agriculture roughly consists of five sectors: greenhouse-based, tillage-based, fruit agriculture, animal husbandry and fishery.

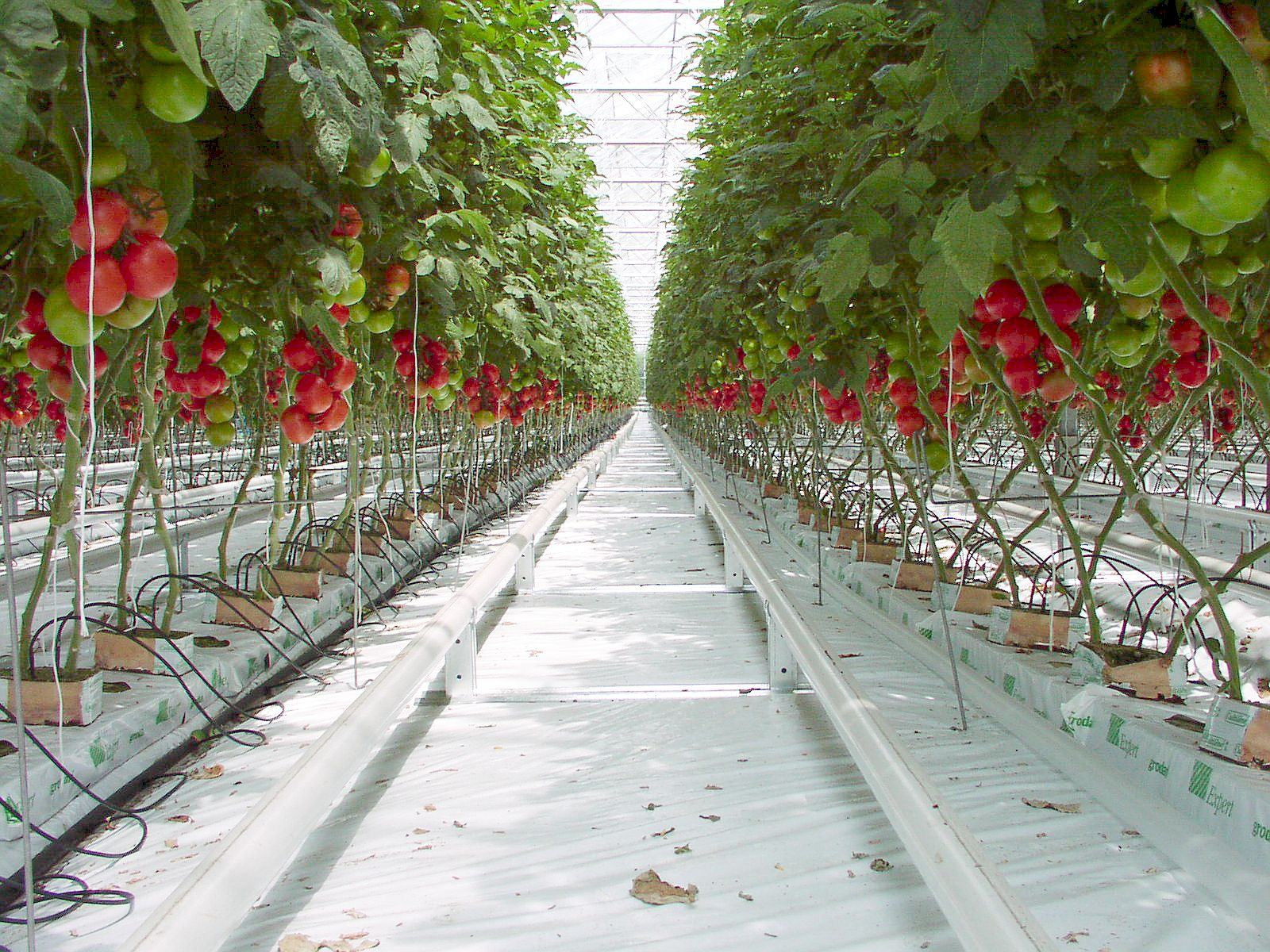
In Westland region, greenhouse capital of the world, a million tons of tomatoes per year are grown on only 18 square kilometers of area, making it number one globally in efficiency.

- Greenhouses, mostly concentrated in the west, are used to produce tomatoes, lettuce, cucumbers, and sweet peppers. Wageningen University and Research is the primary architect of high-tech greenhouse technology, and is considered the top agricultural research institution in the world.
- Tillage-based crops, concentrated in Flevoland, the north and the southwest, include potatoes, kale, beetroot, green beans, carrots, celeriac, onions, all common kinds of cabbages, Brussels sprouts, cauliflower, endive, spinach, Belgian endive, asparagus and lettuce.
- Fruits, concentrated in the Betuwe, Zeeland and Limburg, include apples, pears, cherries, berries, and plums.
- Dairy cattle is concentrated in Friesland, Overijssel and Groene Hart, chickens in Gelderland, Brabant and Limburg, pigs in Brabant and Limburg, sheep in Texel and Friesland, and goats for cheese production in Gelderland and Brabant.
- The fishery sector lands cod, herring, European plaice, sole, mackerel, eels, tuna, salmon, trout, oysters, mussels, shrimp, and sardines in the harbours of Urk, IJmuiden, Den Oever, Harlingen en Lauwersoog, Zoutkamp, Scheveningen, Yerseke, Stellendam and Vlissingen. The Dutch are famous for their smoked eel and soused herring, which is eaten raw.

=== Regional ===
Many food origins can be traced back to one of the three general regional forms of Dutch cuisine. Some agricultural products and foodstuffs from these regions are protected by EU law as Protected designation of origin, like jenever, Noord-Hollandse Gouda, and kanterkaas (cumin cheese and clove cheese), Traditional speciality guaranteed, like boerenkaas (farmer's cheese) and Hollandse nieuwe (soused herring), and the less strict variant of Protected geographical indication, like Edam Holland and Limburgse vlaai.

==== Western cuisine ====
Western Dutch cuisine is found in the provinces of North Holland, South Holland, Zeeland, Utrecht and the Gelderlandic region of Betuwe. Due to the abundance of flat grassland and accessible freshwater sources, this region is ideal for raising cattle and is known for its many dairy products. Historically, the direct access to the sea made fish readily available, as well as spices, coffee, chocolate and sugar shipped from the overseas colonies.

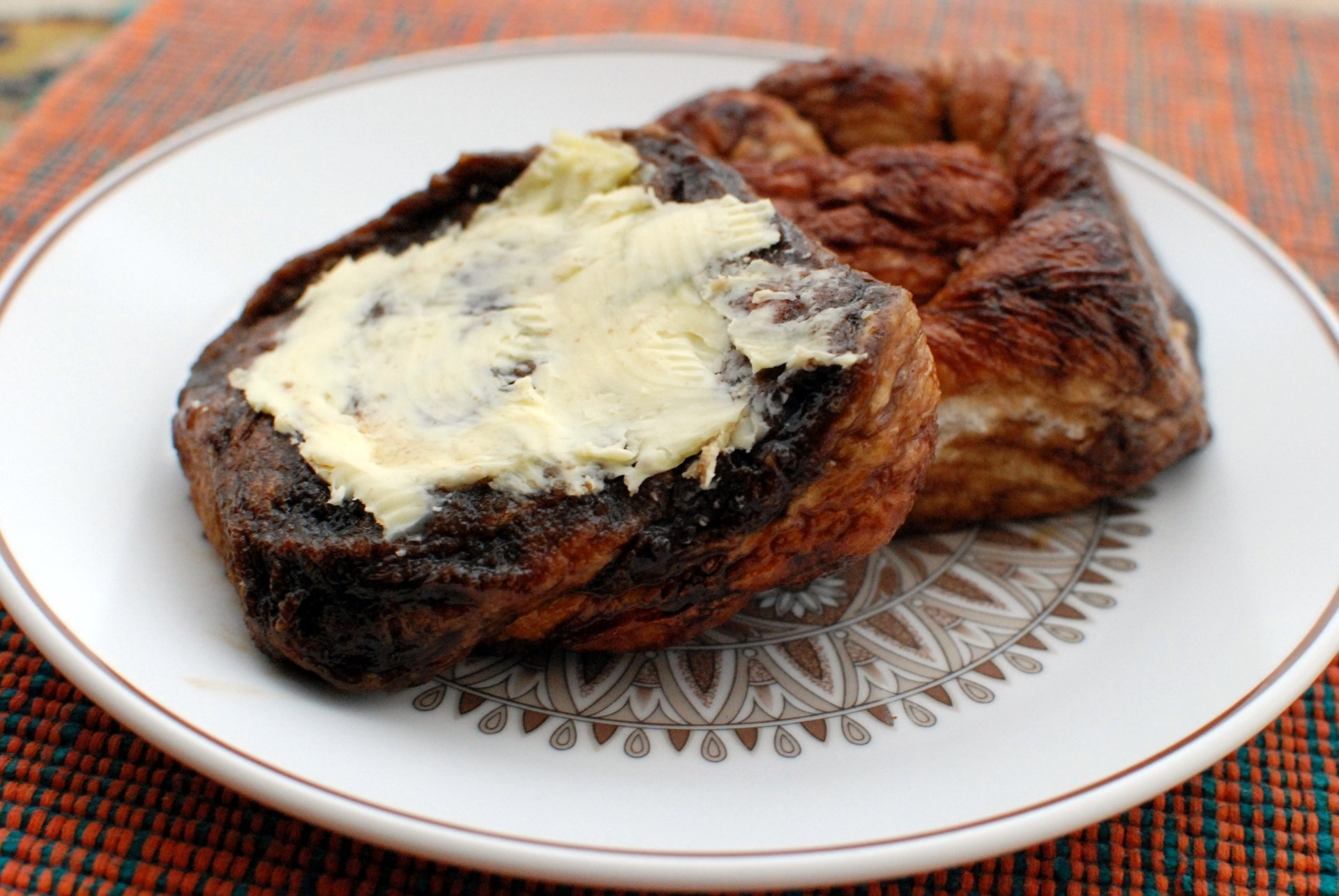
A Zeeuwse bolus with butter

The butter produced by Zeeland and South Holland contains a larger amount of milkfat than most other European varieties, resulting in a regional cuisine with a wide variety of rich, buttery flavoured pastry. Cookies of all sorts are produced in great number and tend to contain much butter and sugar. The stroopwafel is well known, as are cookies with a filling of some kind, mostly almond, like gevulde koek. Pastries in this area also tend to be quite doughy and to contain large amounts of sugar, either caramelised, powdered or crystallised. The oliebol (in its modern form) and Zeeuwse bolus are good examples. Duivekater is a moist doughy white bread from the Zaanstreek in North Holland which is eaten with butter; the recipe goes back hundreds of years.

A by-product of the butter-making process, buttermilk (karnemelk) is typically used in this region's cuisine. Leyden cheese, spiced with cumin and traditionally produced with skimmed milk, can also be considered a by-product in the same way. Traditional farm-made Leyden cheese from this region has been given a protected designation of origin.

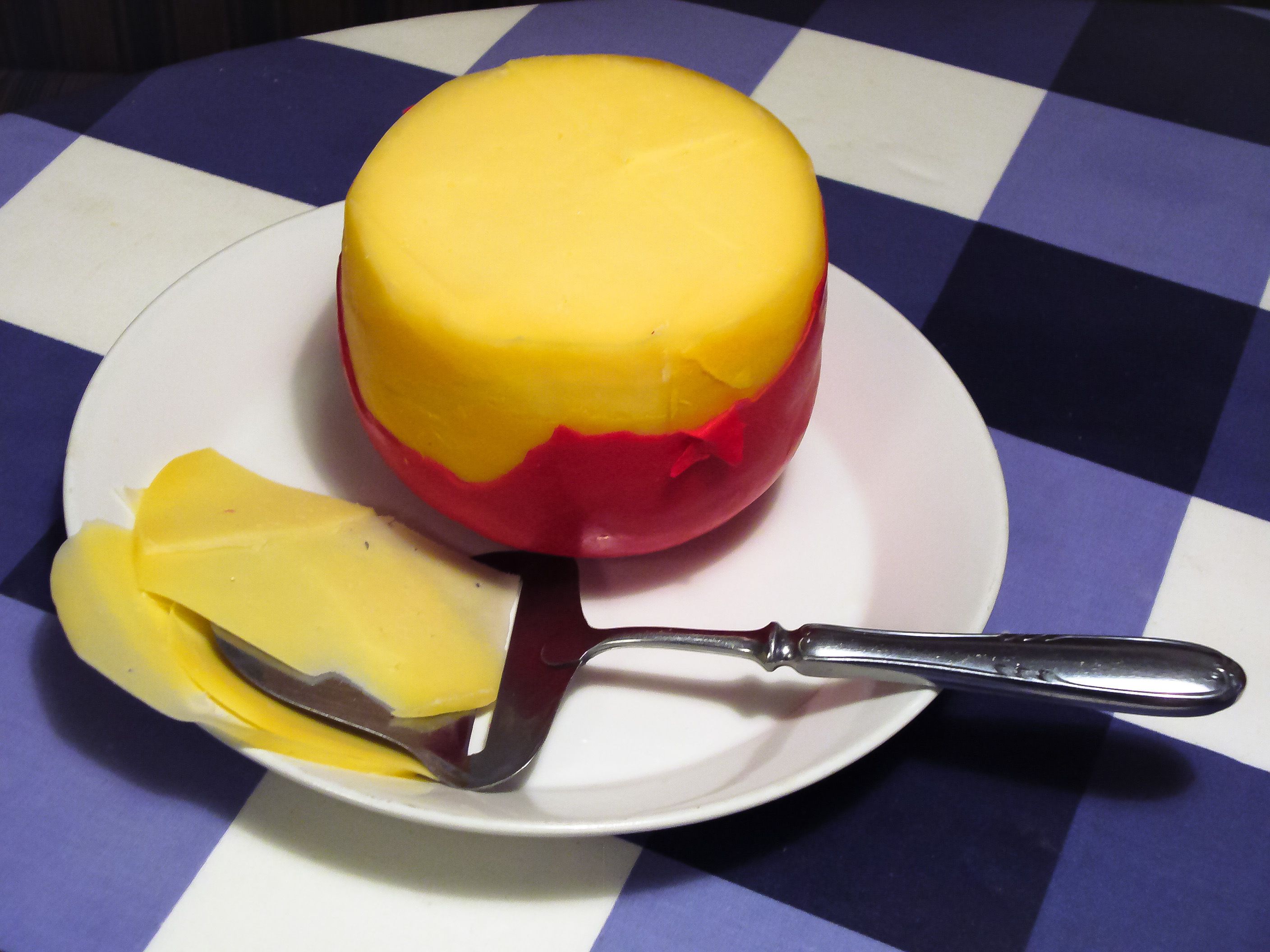
A small Edam cheese with the traditional red wax coating

For centuries this region has provided prominent Dutch cheeses, named after the cities where each cheese was sold. Recorded history of Gouda cheese arguably starts in 1184, making it one of the oldest cheeses that is still in production using its original recipe. Edam cheese, traditionally produced in small waxed spheres, has been made since the 14th century. These cheeses are made with full-fat milk, and thus they are not by-products of butter production; the young varieties have a milky flavour.

Cheeses sold as Gouda or Edam are now produced everywhere in the world. However, the European Commission has designated the specific names "Gouda Holland" and "Edam Holland" as protected geographical indications (PGIs). Cheese that are certified with these protected names must be produced in Holland using traditional methods with milk from Dutch cows and must undergo a natural aging process. Trademarked cheeses such as Leerdammer, Beemster and Rotterdamsche Oude also originate in this region.

Seafood such as soused herring, mussels (called Zeeuwse Mosselen, since all Dutch mussels for consumption are cleaned in Zeeland's Oosterschelde), eels, oysters and shrimp are widely available and typical for the region. Kibbeling, small chunks of battered white fish, is a local snack that has grown in popularity to become a national fast food.

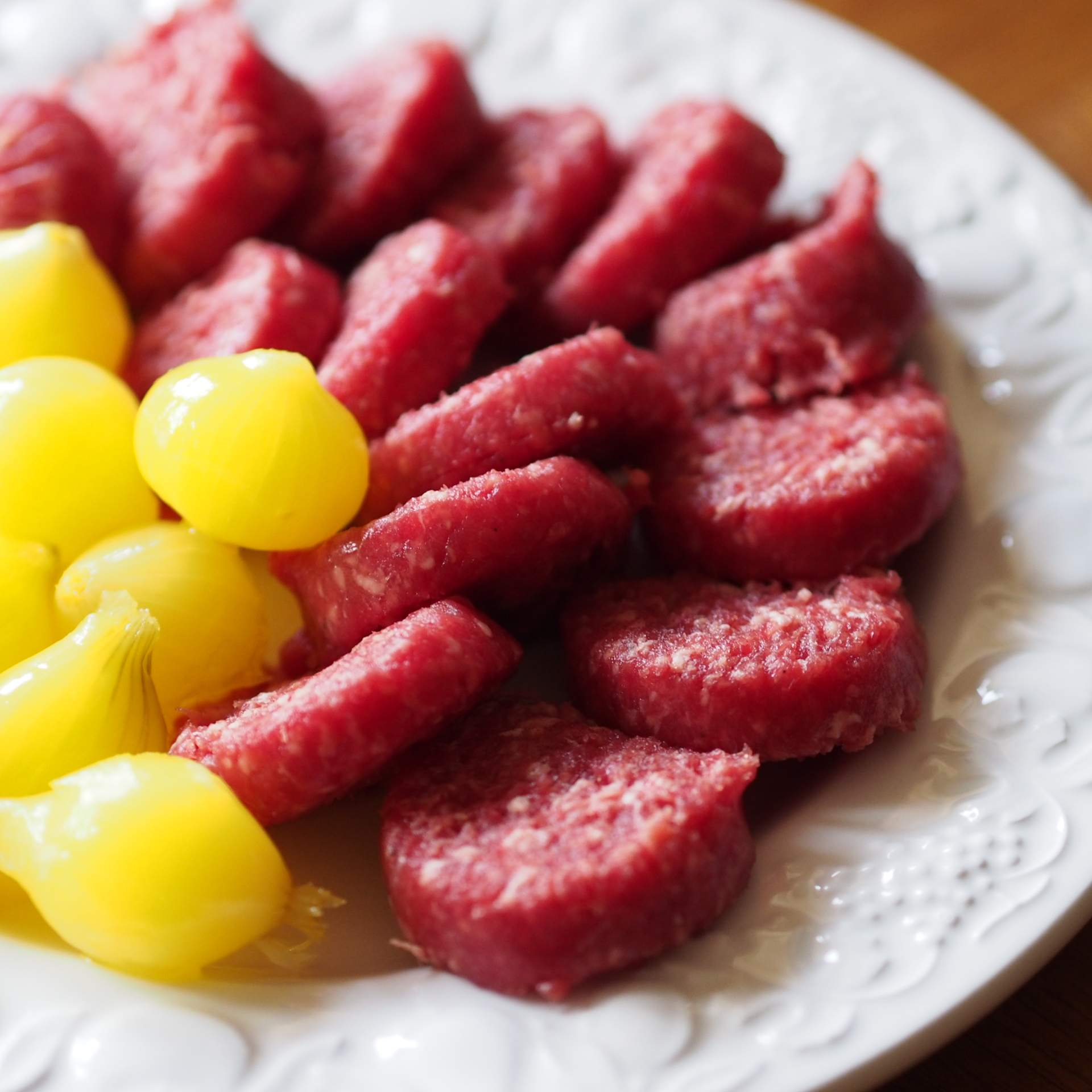
Ossenworst with Amsterdam onions.

Indirectly a product of the sea due to its imported spices, Ossenworst (ox sausage) is a raw beef sausage which used to be made of ox meat. This specialty has its origins in seventeenth-century Amsterdam, when oxen were imported large-scale from Denmark and Germany. The spices in the sausage, such as pepper, cloves, mace and nutmeg, came overseas from the Dutch East Indies. Aged beef was used for this sausage, which was smoked at such a low temperature that the meat remained raw. Present-day Amsterdam ossenworst is made with lean beef, and the sausage is now often neither smoked nor aged. It is often eaten with Amsterdamse uitjes, a kind of pickled onion. The tradition of pickling onions and augurk or zure bom (pickled cucumbers) is a contribution of Amsterdam's Jewish community. Traditionally, soused herring is only eaten in Amsterdam with pickled cucumber.

The region harbours the largest cocoa cluster in the world, making the Netherlands one of the leading exporters of chocolate. The chocolate industry is located in this region both because of its colonial past and because Amsterdam was the site of an important innovation in chocolate production. In 1828 Coenraad van Houten developed a new process that allowed chocolate — which until then had been consumed as a liquid — to be manufactured in solid form. Van Houten produced chocolate first in Amsterdam and later in Leiden and Weesp, while Droste began in Haarlem. Chocomel originated in Zoetermeer; this trademarked chocolate-flavoured milk is a very popular type of Koek-en-zopie (the food and drink sold to ice skaters). Zaandam is home to Verkade and also the headquarters of a relatively new Dutch fair trade chocolate brand, Tony's Chocoloney. De Zaanstreek is also noted for its mayonnaise (a popular condiment for French fries) and its whole-grain mustards (a popular accompaniment to bitterballen).

A kroket is usually eaten with mustard as well. Besides industrial production, high quality kalfsvleeskroketten, were produced by bakeries from the big cities in the 20th century. FEBO, Van Dobben, Kwekkeboom and Holtkamp all started off as pastry bakeries and are now well known producers of quality kalfsvleeskroketten, that has a ragout of rough chopped tender veal as filling.

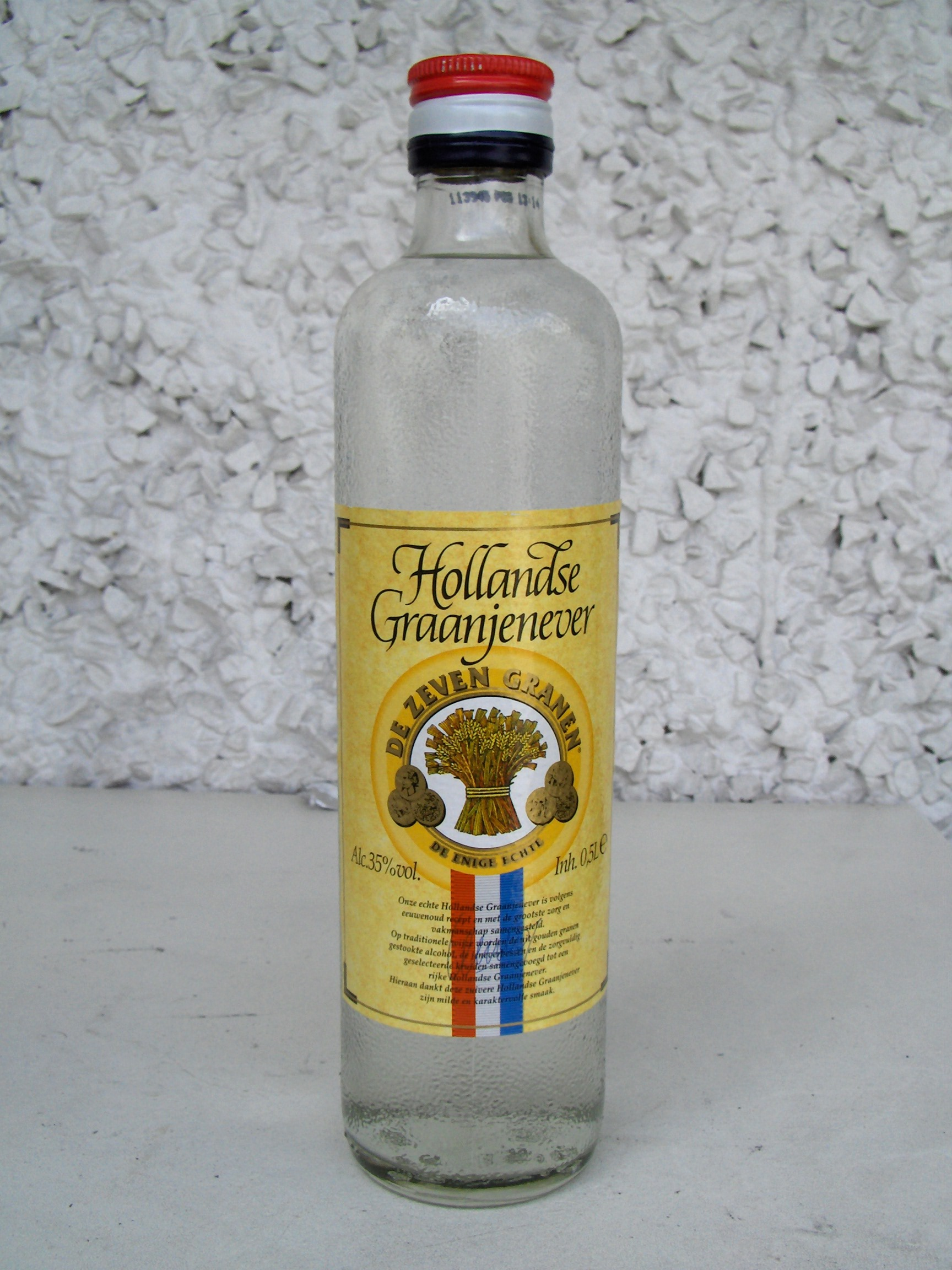
Hollandse graanjenever

The traditional alcoholic beverages of this region are beer (pale lager) and jenever, a high proof juniper-flavored spirit that came to be known in England as gin. The region is home to the majority of the jeneversteden, or 'jenever cities'. Lucas Bols in Amsterdam and Nolet (Ketel One) in Schiedam are the oldest and third-oldest distilleries of the world respectively. Delft is also known for its jenever. The Bols family established a liquor distillery in Amsterdam in 1575 that started worldwide distribution of its products at the turn of the 18th century, with 300 liquor recipes. It has since introduced many other flavours, such as Blue Curaçao and Pisang Ambon. The Nolet Distillery in Schiedam was founded in 1691, and has remained in the Nolet family ever since. A notable exception to the traditional types of Dutch alcoholic beverages is also native to this region: advocaat, a rich and creamy liqueur made from eggs, sugar and brandy.

==== Northeastern cuisine ====
The provinces of Groningen, Friesland, Drenthe, Overijssel and Gelderland north of the great rivers are the home of northeastern Dutch cuisine, which is generally known for its many kinds of meats. This region is the least populated area of the Netherlands. Large-scale agriculture was not introduced here until the 18th century, and the relative lack of farms allowed for an abundance of game and animal husbandry. The coastal regions of Friesland, Groningen and the parts of Overijssel bordering the IJsselmeer also include a large amount of fish in their traditional dishes.

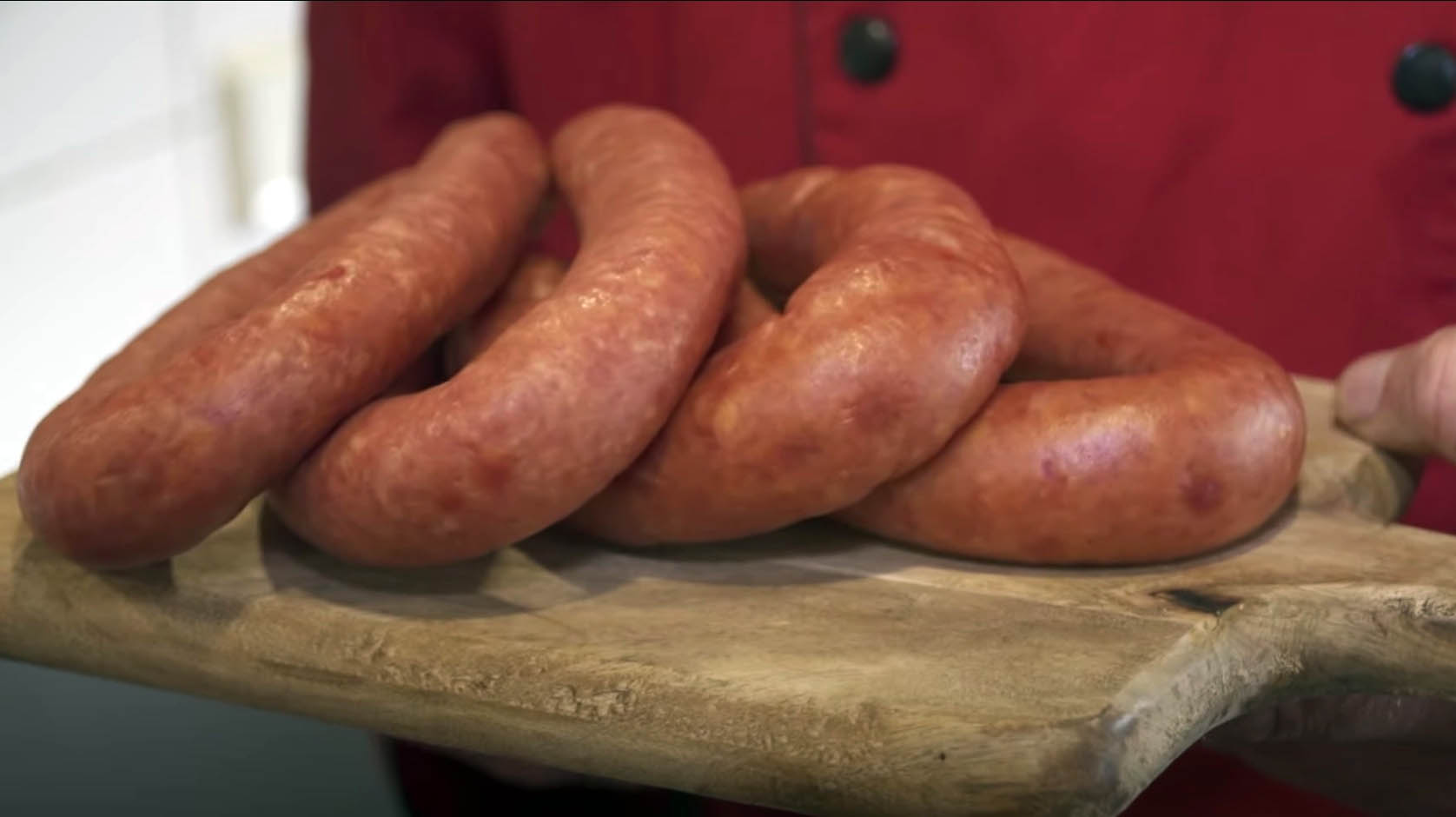
Gelderse rookworst

The metworst is a dried sausage found throughout this region, with most towns and villages having their own variety. The most famous sausage from this region, however, is Gelderse rookworst, a smoked sausage. The Dutch eat 60 million rookworst a year. This sausage traditionally is smoked over oak and beechwood chips before being boiled in water. The juicy sausage contains much fat and is often eaten alongside stamppot, like zuurkoolstamppot (mashed potatoes and sauerkraut). Cut in half they are sometimes eaten as a street food. Kruudmoes, a traditional food with buttermilk, pearl barley, bacon and herbs in which rookworst is processed, is local to Gelderland (in and around the Veluwe) and Overijssel (in Salland). Balkenbrij is a traditional food originating from farms in the whole region, consisting of meat scraps, a mix of spices (rommelkruid) and buckwheat. Eierbal, is a deep-fried egg in ragout, particularly eaten in Groningen en Drenthe.

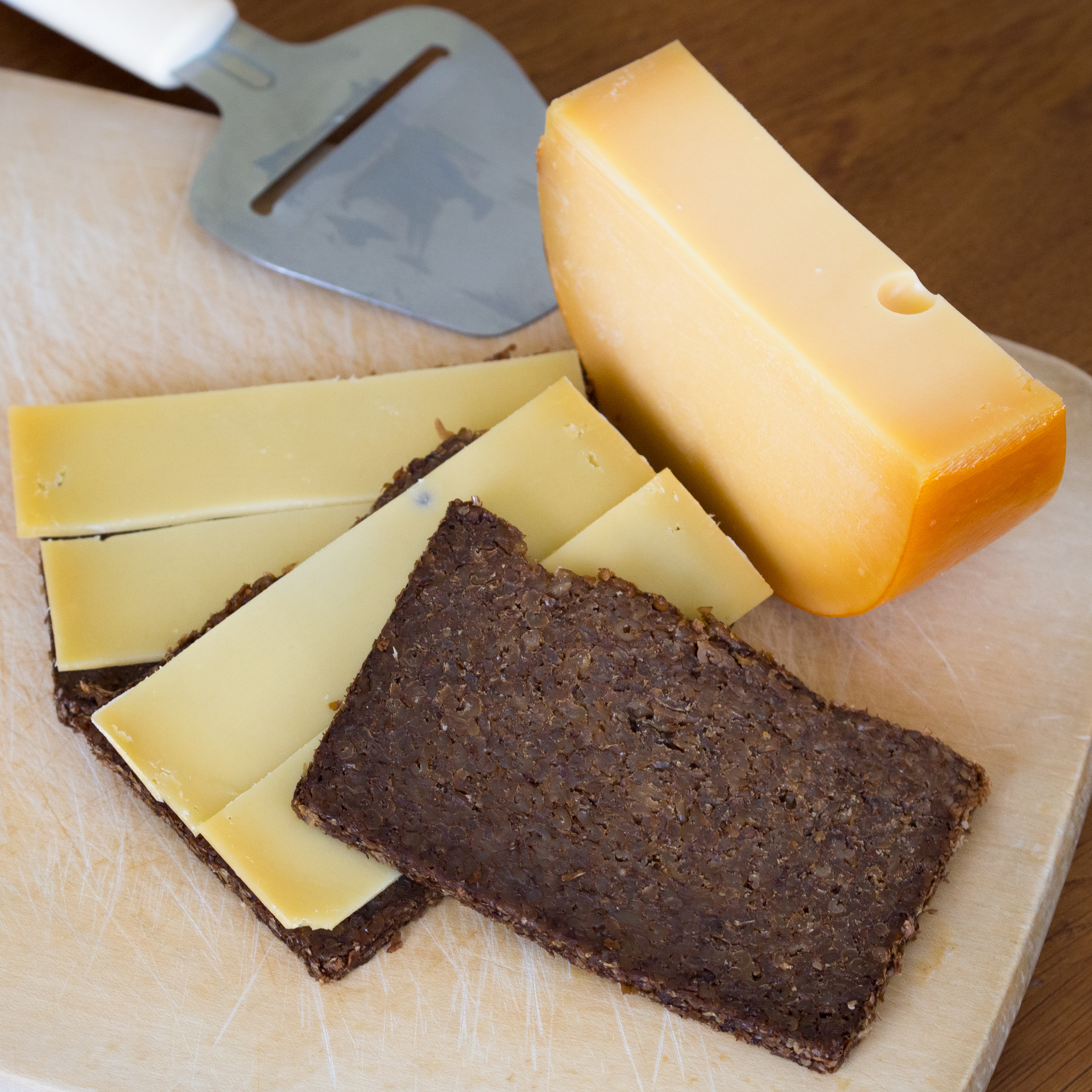
Fries roggebrood with kaas

This region is also home to more heavy and solid varieties of Dutch pastries, cookies and breads. Each of the provinces of Gelderland, Overijssel and Groningen has a long-standing rye bread tradition, but rye bread from Friesland (Fries roggebrood, a kind of pumpernickel) has become especially well known because of its distinctive taste. Frisian rye bread is notable for its long baking time (up to 20 hours), which results in a sweet flavour and a deep dark color. In contrast to southern Dutch bread, which tends to be soft and moist, the northeastern rye bread and pastries generally are of a hard texture, and the pasties are heavily spiced with ginger or succade or contain small bits of meat. Typical examples for the region include kruidkoek (such as Groninger koek), Frisian suikerbrood (with chunks of sugar), Fryske dúmkes (cookies with anise, ginger, and hazelnuts) and spekdik (small pancakes with metworst and bacon).

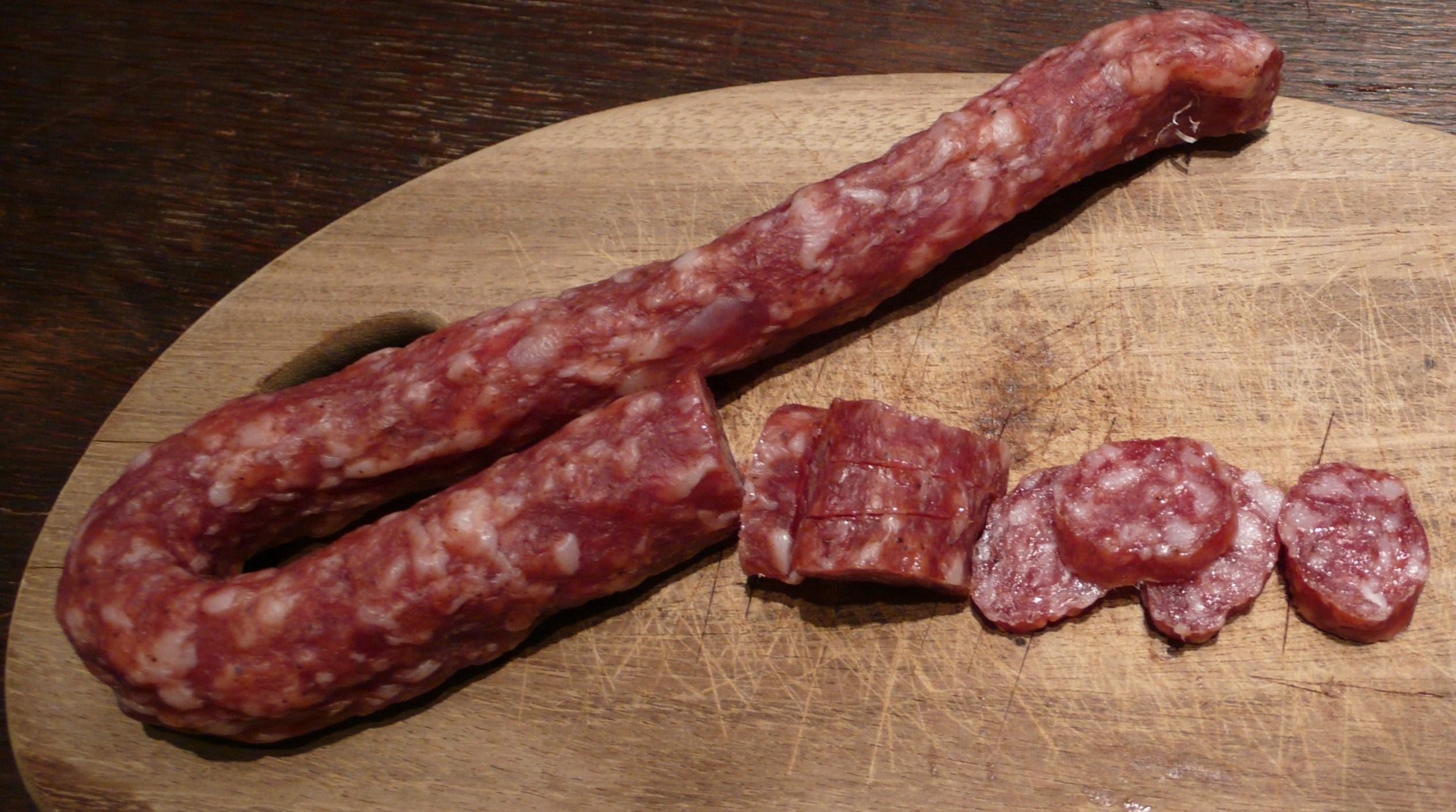
Groninger metworst

In terms of alcoholic beverages, the region is renowned for its many bitters (such as Beerenburg) and other high-proof liquors rather than the beer that is more typical in the rest of the country. The city of Groningen is a 'jenever city' — the only one not located in the western region — and home to the Hooghoudt distillery. Friesland with its low-lying pastures also has a feature in common with western Dutch cuisine, that of cheese production. Friese Nagelkaas (Friesian clove cheese) is a notable example, and the variant made with skimmed milk known as kanterkaas has been granted a protected designation of origin.

==== Southern cuisine ====
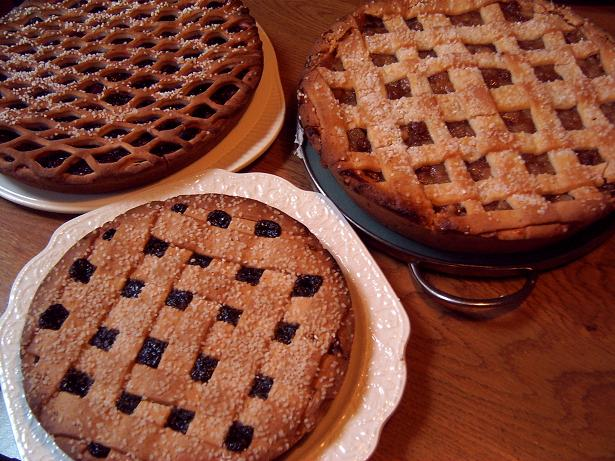
Limburgish vlaai

Southern Dutch cuisine constitutes the cuisine of the Dutch provinces of North Brabant and Limburg and the Flemish Region in Belgium. It is renowned for its many rich pastries, soups, stews and vegetable dishes and is often called Bourgondisch (Burgundian) which is a Dutch idiom invoking the Burgundian dukes who ruled the Low Countries in the Middle Ages. In this region the dukes had their court, which was renowned for its great feasts. The culinary tradition in this region overlaps with that of neighbouring Flanders.

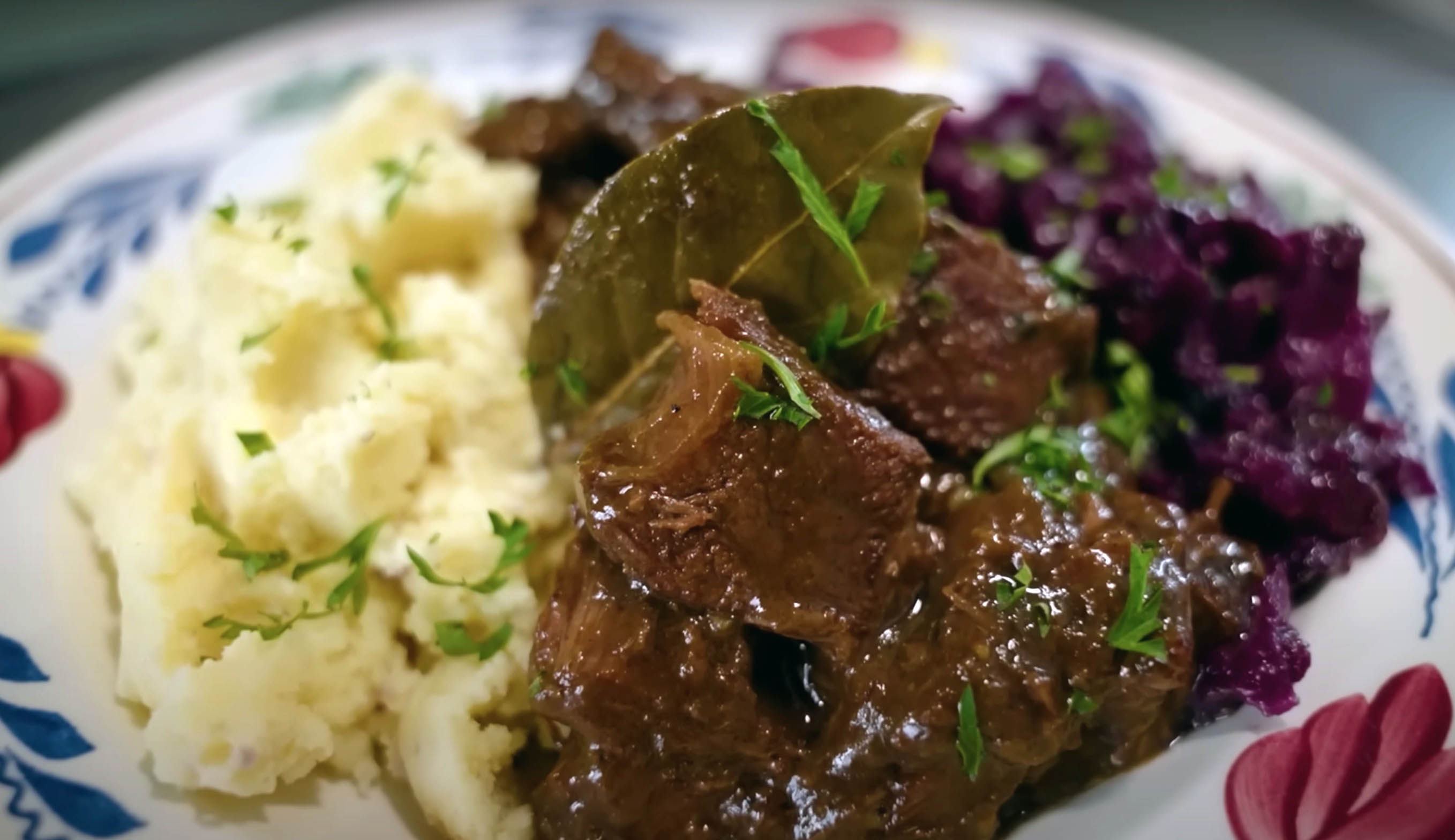
Hachee met rodekool

It is the Dutch culinary region which developed an haute cuisine and it forms the base of most traditional Dutch restaurants including typical main courses served such as Biefstuk, Varkenshaas, Ossenhaas, these are premium cuts of meat, generally pork or beef, accompanied by a wide variety of sauces and potatoes which have been double fried in the traditional Dutch (or Belgian) manner.

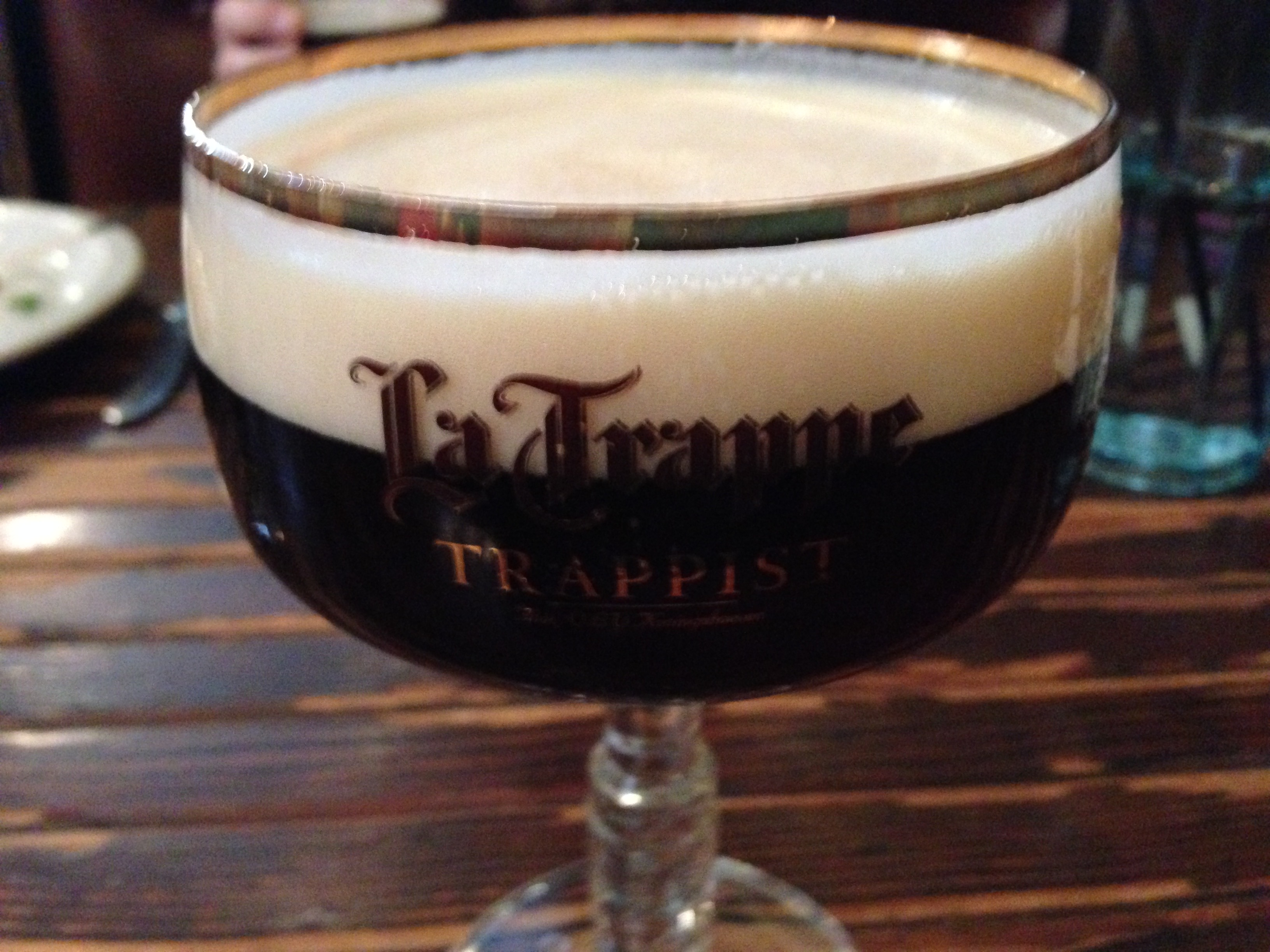
Trappist beer from Tilburg

Stews, such as hachee, a stew of onions, beef and a thick gravy, is flavourful and require hours to prepare. Vegetable soups are made from richly flavored stock or bouillon and typically contain small meatballs alongside a wide variety of different vegetables. Asparagus and witloof are highly prized and traditionally eaten with cheese or ham.

In Southern regions a variant of the croquette emerged in the post-war decades from butcher-run production of long-braised beef ragout (hence the "butcher's croquette" and its shredded-meat texture). By contrast, in Amsterdam a diced-(veal-)meat croquette (blokjesvleeskroket) became customary in luxuray patisserie-linked brands (hence the "pastry baker's croquette"), since the 40's.

Pastries are abundant, often with rich fillings of cream, custard and—due to the many fruit orchards (omnipresent in Betuwe region)—fruits. Cakes, such as the Limburgse vlaai from Limburg and the Moorkop and Bossche Bol from Brabant, are typical pastries. Savoury pastries also occur, with the Brabantian worstenbroodje (a roll with a sausage of ground beef, literally translates into sausage bread) being the most popular. It even has been included in the national inventory of intangible cultural heritage.

Limburg is also known for its appelstroop (apple butter), where it may have been originated.

The traditional alcoholic beverage of the region is beer. There are many local brands, ranging from Trappist beer to Kriek lambic. 5 of the 11 International Trappist Association-recognised breweries in the world, are located in the Southern Dutch cultural area. Beer, like wine in French cuisine, is also used in cooking; often in stews.

=== Colonial ===
==== Indonesian ====
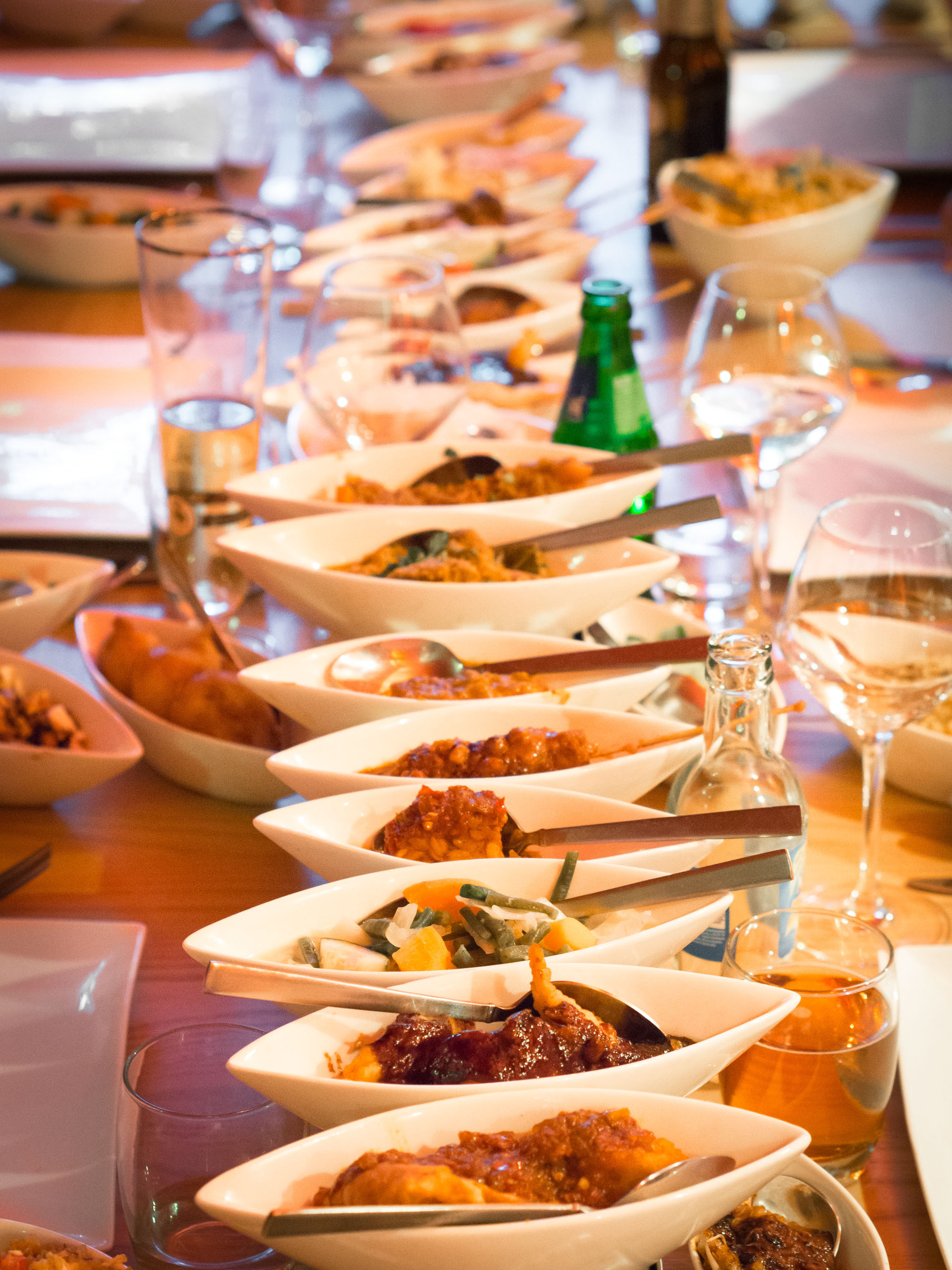
Rijsttafel

Indonesian and Indo dishes became popular due to the arrival of former Dutch colonials and people of Eurasian descent into the Netherlands, especially after the independence of Indonesia from Dutch colonial rule in 1945. Countess Cornelia van Limburg Stirum writes in her book The Art of Dutch Cooking (1962): "There exist countless Indonesian dishes, some of which take hours to prepare; but a few easy ones have become so popular that they can be regarded as 'national dishes'". She then provides recipes for nasi goreng (fried rice), pisang goreng (fried bananas), lumpia goreng (fried spring rolls), bami (fried noodles), saté (satay or grilled skewered meat), satésaus (satay sauce or peanut sauce), and sambal oelek (chilli paste). Dutch-Indonesian fusion dishes originated in the Netherlands or in the Dutch Indies during colonial times, is rijsttafel ("rice table"), which is an elaborate meal consisting of up to several dozen small dishes filling an entire table, spekkoek, a layered cake, and babi pangang speciaal, which is, unlike in Indonesia, served in a sweet sour sauce. Popular Indonesian-Dutch fusion dishes sold at Dutch snackbars are patatje oorlog (French fries with mayonnaise, onions and peanut sauce), patatje pinda (French fries with peanut sauce), bamischijf (or bamiblok) and nasischijf (or nasiblok). Another Indonesian-inspired food popular in the Netherlands is long sheets of krupuk.

Outside the big cities, Indonesian food is served in Chinese restaurants, and almost every town in the Netherlands has a Chinese-Indonesian (Chinees-Indische) restaurant. In the 1980s, 60% of Dutch people went out to eat at a Chinese Indonesian restaurant, 30% of whom at least once a month. This typical Dutch restaurant fusion is now in decline. In February 2021, this Chinese-Indonesian restaurant culture - where three cultures come together (Chinese, Indonesian and Dutch) - was acknowledged as Dutch intangible cultural heritage that needs to be preserved.

==== Surinamese and Caribbean ====
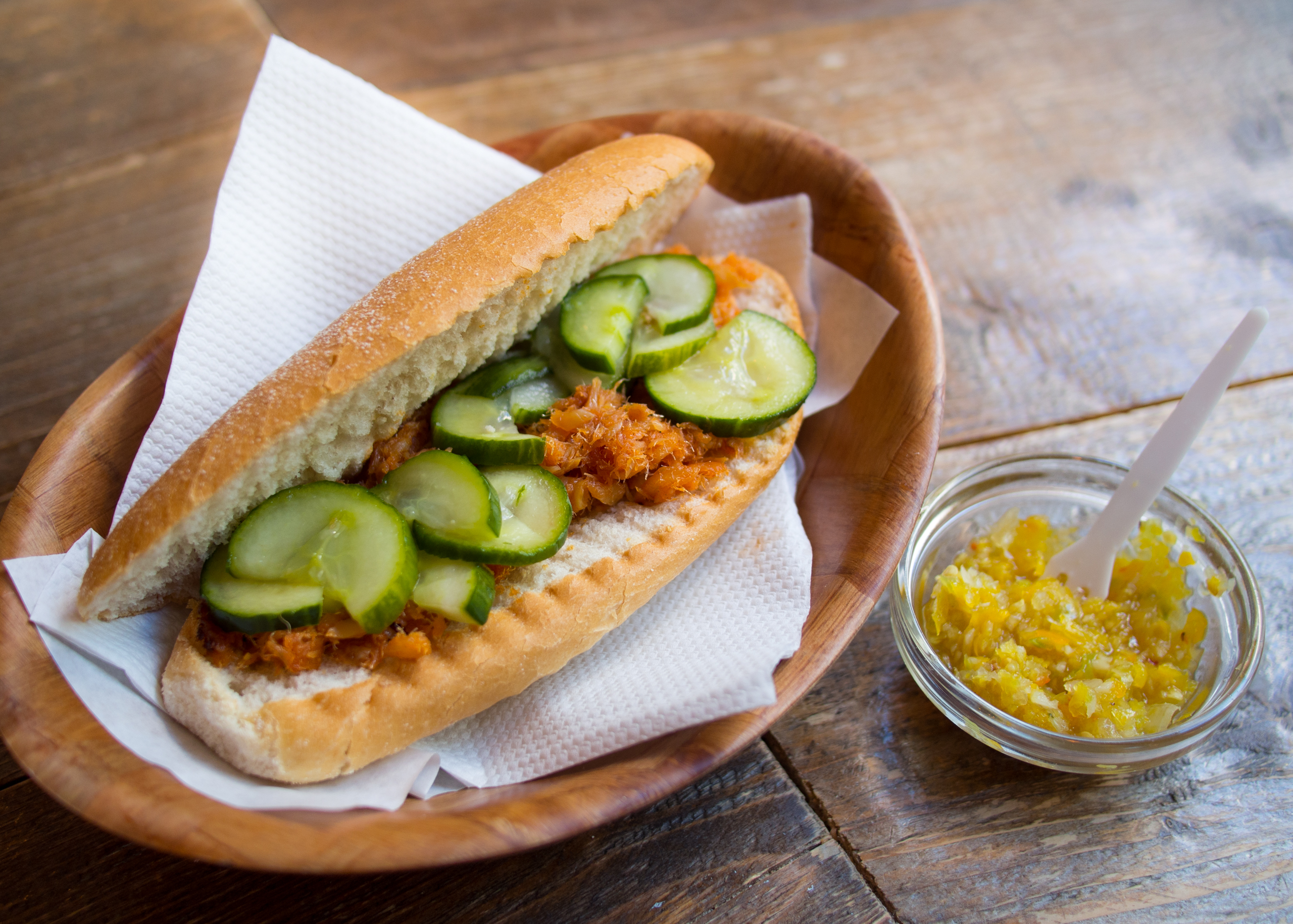
Broodje bakkeljauw

Surinamese cuisine is also popular in the Netherlands, especially in the bigger cities. Surinamese establishments commonly offer roti, a staple of the Hindustani community in Suriname, various Surinamese interpretations of Chinese Indonesian cuisine, and Surinamese sandwiches (Surinaamse broodjes) such as broodje bakkeljauw (with a type of dried and salted cod) and broodje pom.

=== International ===
The first Italian restaurants appeared in the fifties followed by Turkish and Moroccan kebab and shawarma restaurants, and American fast food restaurants in the seventies, sometimes resulting in Dutch fusion dishes, for example kapsalon (based on kebab), McKroket and McFlurry stroopwafel (both sold only in Dutch McDonald's restaurants). In the bigger cities, nowadays, foods from all corners of the globe are sold in shops and restaurants.

== Structure of meals ==
=== Breakfast ===
Alongside yoghurt, fruit and muesli, ontbijt (breakfast) consists of bread, usually with butter and sweet toppings such as hagelslag, vlokken, muisjes, vruchtenhagel, gestampte muisjes, treacle, apple butter, kokosbrood, jam, chocolate spread, and speculaas.

Dutch bread tends to be very airy, as it is made from yeast dough. From the 1970s onward Dutch bread became predominantly whole-grain, with additional seeds such as sunflower or pumpkin seeds often mixed with the dough for taste. Rye bread is one of the few dense breads of the Netherlands. White bread used to be the luxury bread, often made with milk as well as water. A typical Dutch white bread is tiger bread. Ontbijtkoek may be eaten as a substitute for a full breakfast, or simply as a snack. It is served as a thick slice, usually with butter. This popular cake has been around for centuries, since it can be stored for weeks at room temperatures, without it spoiling, due to its pH, sugar content and spices. Ontbijtkoek resembles a soft gingerbread cake, but with much less ginger, hardly any fat and more sugar. The sugar used is the typical Dutch basterdsuiker, an aromatic, moist and fine sugar, which gives a baking product its typical brown color and smooth texture. Basterdsuiker is protected by the EU and acknowledged as a Traditional speciality guaranteed.

Beschuit (Dutch crisp bakes) is also eaten as a breakfast food, with the same variety of sweet toppings, or cheese. A longtime Dutch (romantic) favourite is to serve strawberries on beschuit, which is usually topped with some sugar or whipped cream.

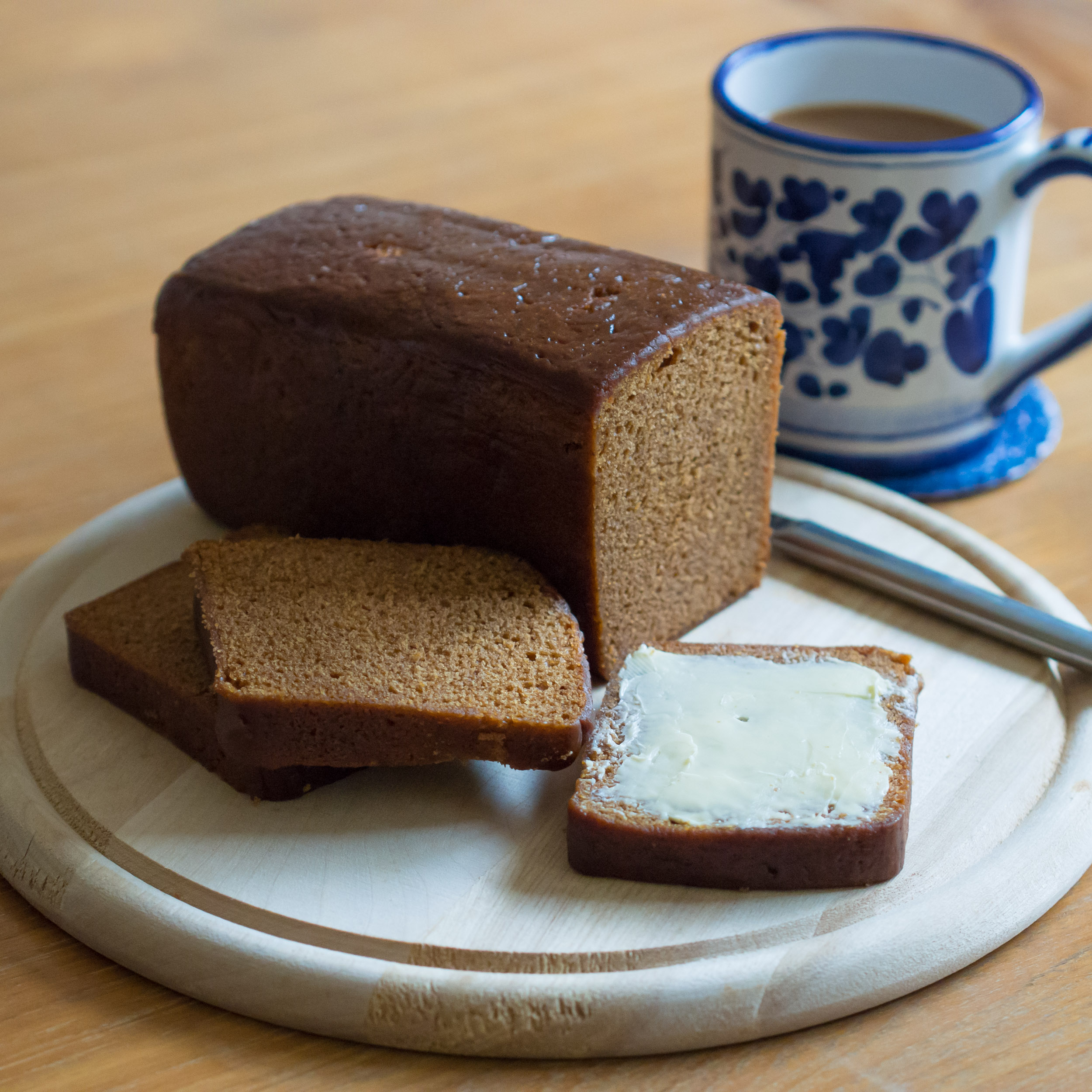
Kruidkoek

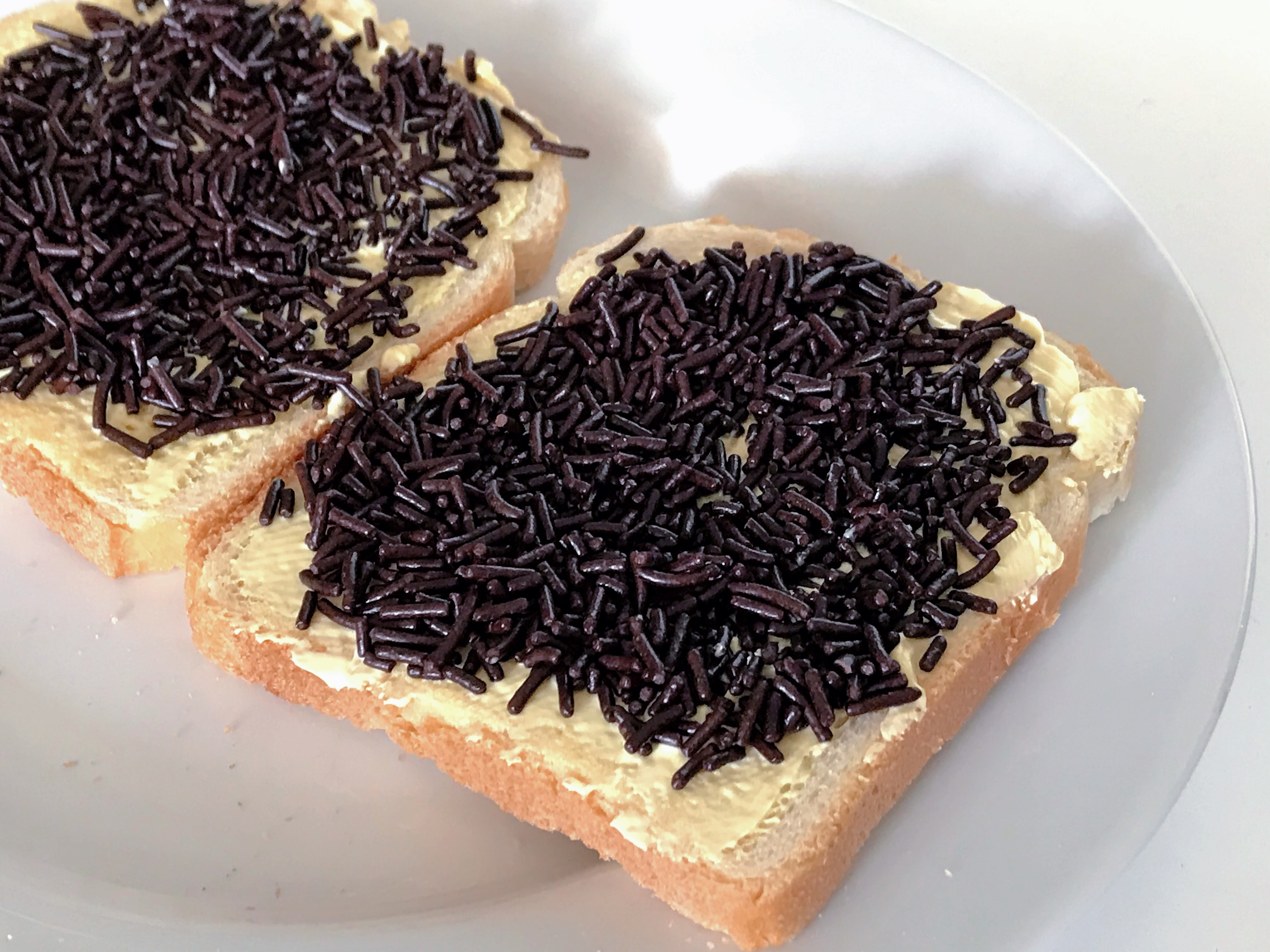
Bread with butter and hagelslag

A popular breakfast in the weekend are pannenkoeken, large and thin pancakes, but not as thin as French crêpes. The batter consists of eggs, milk, a mixture of wheat and buckwheat flour, salt, and vanilla extract. The pancakes are cooked in butter, but a bit of vegetable oil is added to the batter to prevent it from burning. Typical fillings that are cooked with the batter are apples, cheese, raisins, chocolate and bananas. Sometimes pannenkoeken are eaten as dinner in a pannenkoekenhuis (restaurant), and the variety of toppings can include bacon, ragout, salmon and many other things. On the plate pannenkoeken can be topped off with powdered sugar, cinnamon or stroop (Dutch syrup).

Wentelteefjes (French toast) is another breakfast dish with a long history; a recipe was found in Apicius, a Latin cookbook from the 4th and 5th centuries.

=== Lunch ===
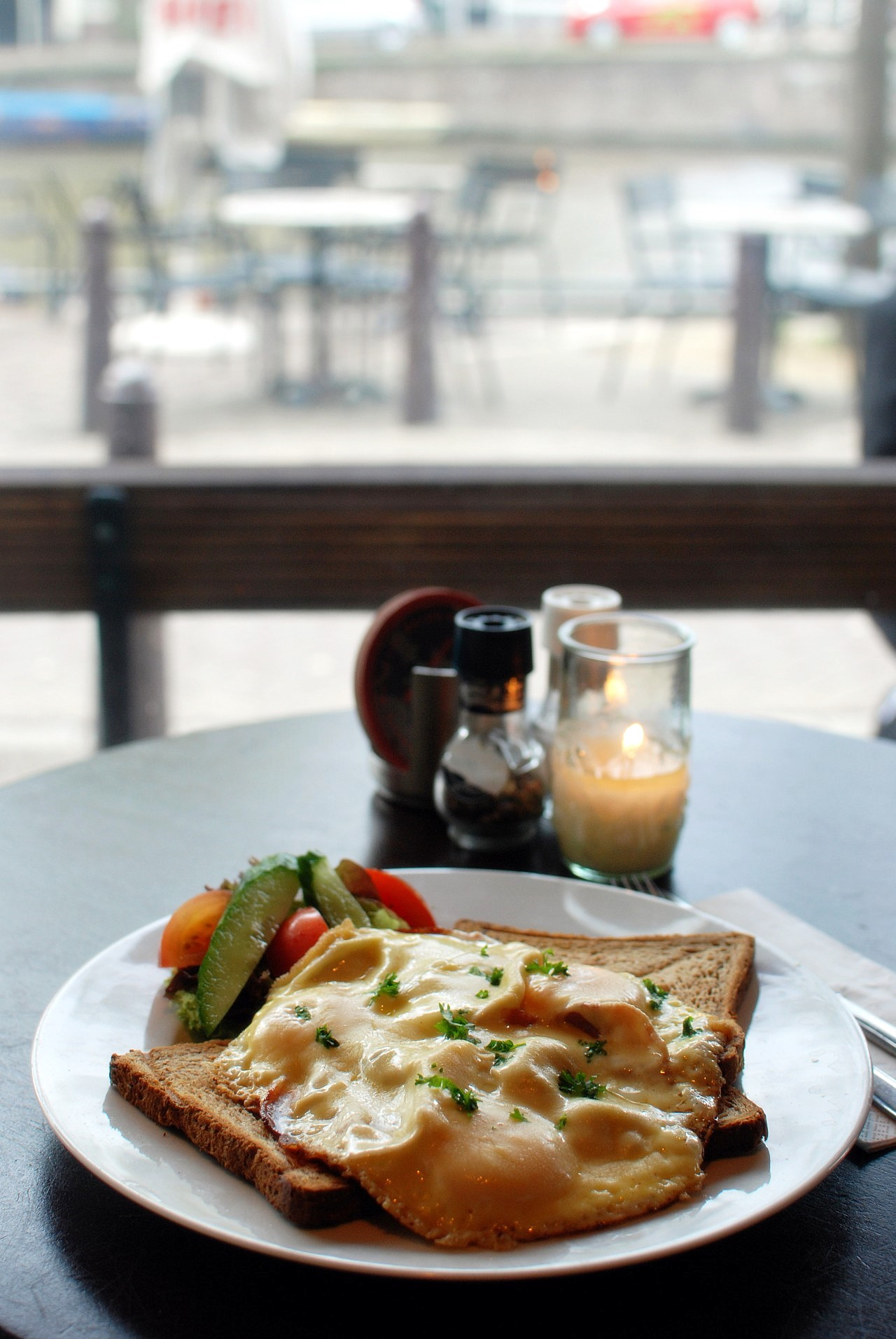
Uitsmijter spek en kaas

Middageten or lunch is somewhat similar to breakfast, but is usually heavier, less sweet, and more savory. However, lunch is not to be a warm meal, and eating leftovers for lunch is not very common. In bars and restaurants, however, uitsmijter is a popular dish: two eggs fried with bacon or Gouda cheese, rosbief (rare roast beef, thinly cut), ham.

Dutch consumers are fond of pindakaas (peanut butter) as a bread topping. The Netherlands is not only the number one importer of peanuts, it is also the biggest exporter of peanut butter, and despite its size, the third largest consumer in Europe. Other popular toppings are filet americain (a finely ground raw lean beef with the addition of mayonnaise, mustard, paprika and other spices).

==== Cheese ====
One of the most popular toppings for bread is cheese. The vast majority of Dutch cheeses are semi-hard or hard cheeses. Famous Dutch cheeses include Gouda and Edam. A typically Dutch way of making cheese is to blend in herbs or spices during the first stages of the production process. Famous examples of this are cheeses with cloves (usually the Friesian Clove), cumin (most famously Leyden cheese), or nettles.

Dutch hard cheeses generally can be divided by maturity:

Dutch name	English	Maturity	Flavour	Texture
Jonge kaas	Young	4 weeks	creamy	soft
Jong belegen	Mildly aged cheese	8–10 weeks	mild	soft
Belegen	Aged	16–18 weeks	full	semi-hard
Extra Belegen	Extra-aged	7–8 months	savoury	semi-hard
Oude kaas	Old	10–12 months	rich and savoury	hard
Overjarig	Very old (literarily: Over-aged)	1–2 years	rich, savoury and salty	crumble with salt crystals

The terms 'jong', 'belegen', 'oud', etc. have not been legally protected with regard to the period of ripening. Cheeses sold in supermarkets may have been produced with a fast-ripening starter. This results in faster formation of crystals, and the fast-ripening starter gives a sweeter flavour to the cheese. Fast ripened cheeses lack the complex terroir of cheeses with a longer ripening process. Names implying a level of ripening while avoiding Dutch words could also be used. For example, Old Amsterdam which is ripened - according to the company - only for 8 months, uses "Old" instead of "Oud".

The designation boerenkaas is legally protected for cheese made on a farm from raw milk. Due to the use of raw (not pasteurised) milk, the enzymes and bacteria present in the cheese remain active during ripening. Boerenkaas is therefore spicier and more complex than factory cheese where pasteurised milk is used. Moreover, the taste of boerenkaas varies from farm to farm because of the diverse dairy cattle breeds, different feed, the season and the craft of the cheese maker.

Fat content on the cheese packaging is also legally protected. For example, '35+' cheese must contain between 35 and 40% fat, '48+' must contain 48-52%. These percentages are calculated based on the dry matter of the cheese. Thus, a 48+ cheese generally contains 29% fat accounting for water contents.

=== Coffee break and sweets ===
Dutch people invite friends over for koffietijd (coffee time), which consists of coffee and cake or biscuits, served between 10:00 and 11:00 am (before lunch), 4:00 pm (between lunch and dinner) or between 7:00 pm and 8:00 pm (after dinner). Dutch thrift of the 1940s and 1950s, when the country was rebuilding the destruction of World War II, led to the famous standard rule of only one cookie with each cup of coffee. Presumably in the late 1940s even the then-Prime Minister, Willem Drees, served coffee and one biscuit to a visiting American diplomat, who then became convinced that the money from the Marshall Plan was being well spent. It has been suggested that the reasons for this can also be found in the Protestant mentality in the northern Netherlands. The Roman Catholic south does not share this tradition as for instance in Limburg, where serving a large vlaai (sweet pie or pastry with filling), cut into eight pieces, is tradition when visitors are expected.

Koffie verkeerd (literally "wrong coffee"), or Café au lait, consists of equal parts black coffee and hot milk. The Dutch drink tea without milk and the tea is weaker than typical English or Irish types of tea which are stronger and are usually taken with milk. In Dutch bars, tea with freshly chopped ginger (verse gemberthee) or with fresh mint leaves (verse muntthee) has become popular in the 21st century. In the autumn and winter hot chocolate or chocomel is drunk. Two traditional Dutch drinks, anijsmelk (hot milk with aniseed) and kwast (hot water with lemon juice) are hardly drunk any more.

Drinks are served with a wide variety of pastry (gebak), cookies (koekjes) and candies (snoep).

==== Gebak ====
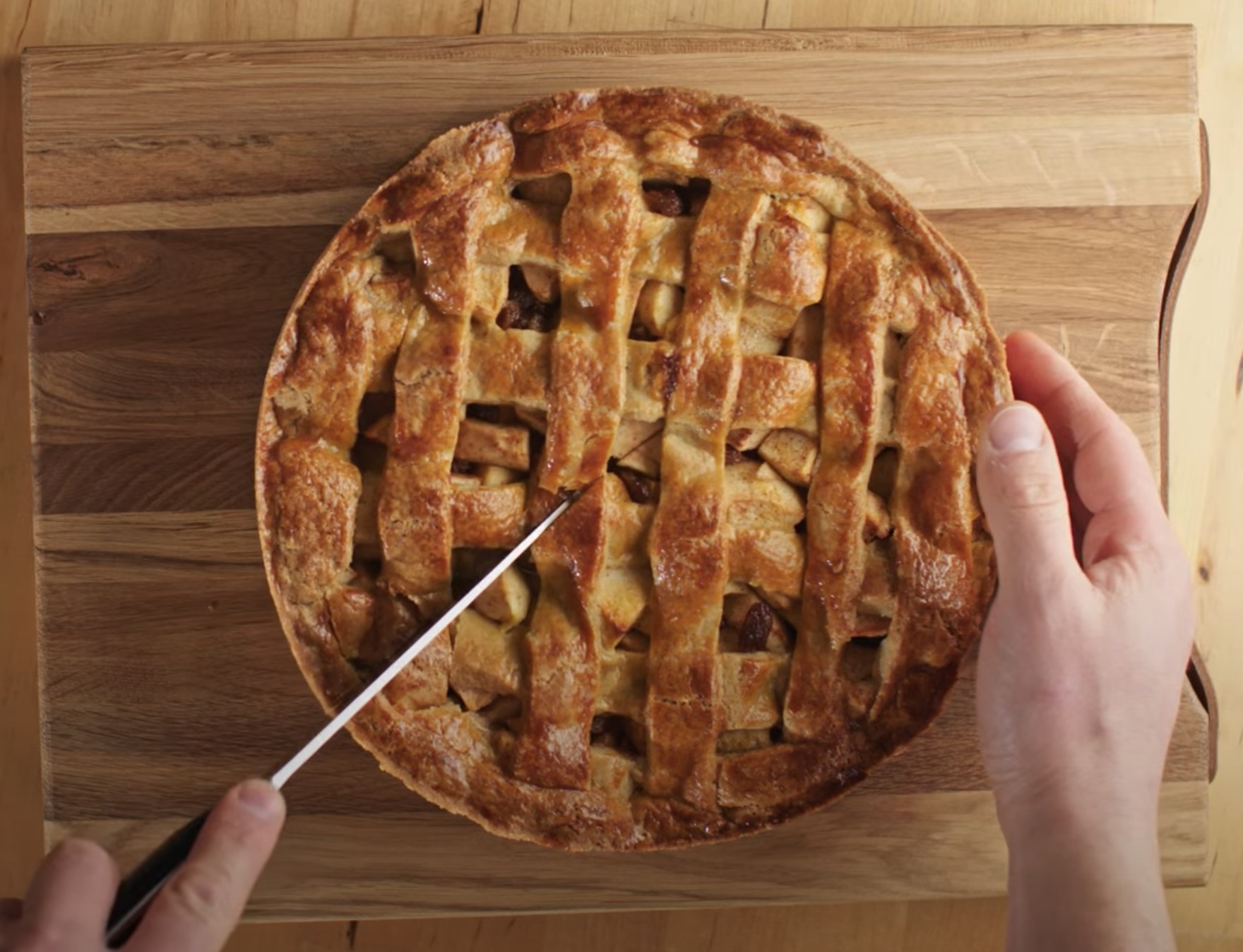
appeltaart

Appeltaart (Dutch-style apple pie) comes in two main varieties: crumble crust (appelkruimeltaart) and lattice (appeltaart). The main difference is the texture and design rather than the flavours. The recipe of both doughs is based on flour, sugar and full-cream butter, and sometimes additional ingredients such as lemon zest. The filling typically uses sour hard apples such as the soft and sweet sour Goudreinet or the crisp and sweet Elstar. Sometimes a small pear is added to the mixture. Fillings are usually flavoured with cinnamon, nutmeg and lemon juice. Dutch apple pie filling sometimes includes additional ingredients such as raisins and nuts. Almond paste is sometimes added as a layer between the apples and the crust, so the moisture of the apple filling does not soften the crust. Apple pie can be served warm or cold, plain, with a dash of whipped cream or vanilla ice cream. In the United States, "Dutch apple pie" refers specifically to the type with a crumb topping.

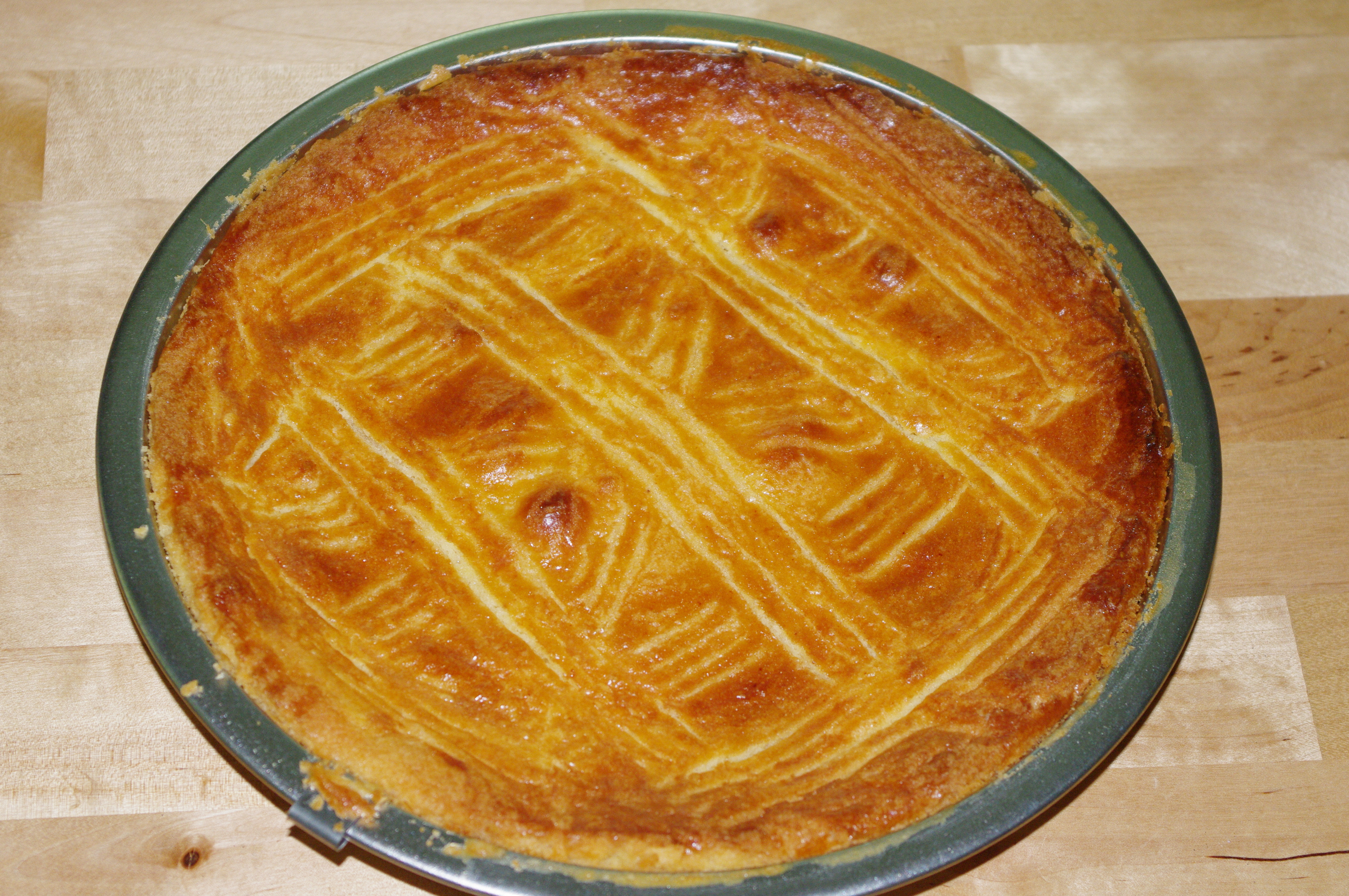
boterkoek

Boterkoek or "butter cake" is a rich, buttery pastry that is somewhere between a cake and a cookie. It has a crust to the outside and has a soft dense inside. The treat has Dutch Jewish origins, with the Jewish original often including candied ginger.

Vlaai is typical for the province of Limburg but is eaten everywhere in the Netherlands. This pastry is made with a yeast dough and filled with fruit such as apple, apricot, pineapple, plum, cherry or berry filling. Other ingredients include custard and rhubarb. Rijstevlaai is stuffed with a rich rice-and-cream filling, and kruimelvlaai has a custard filling with a crumb crust. Vlaai can be topped with fruits, whipped cream or chocolate.

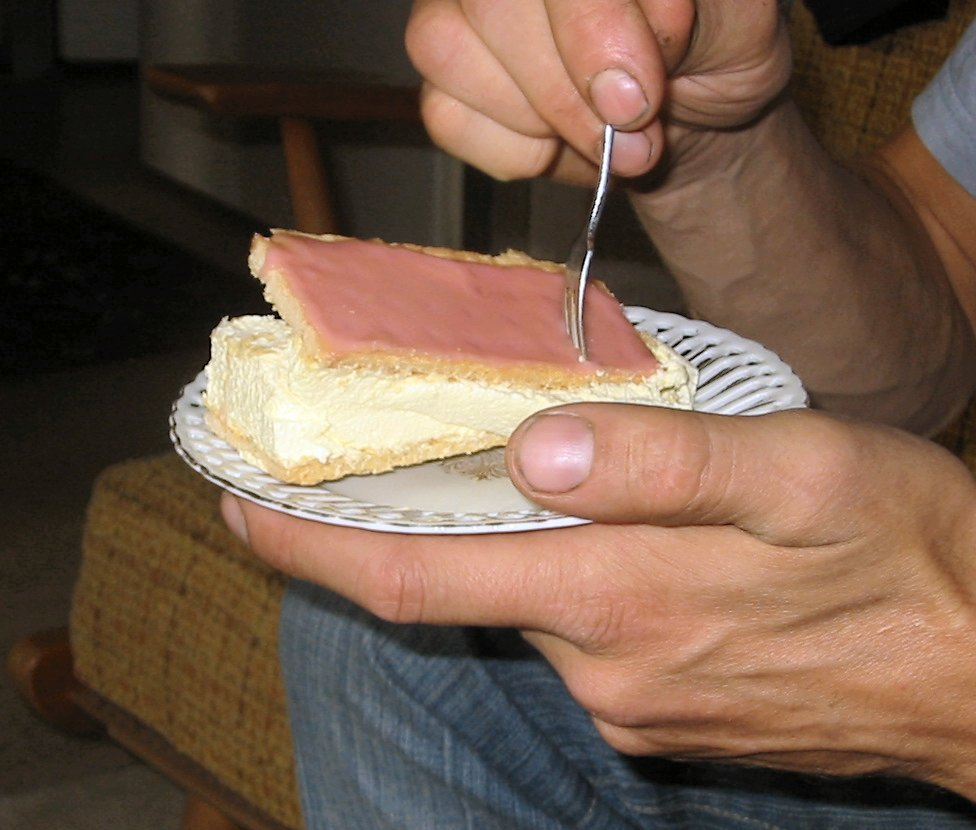
tompouce

Tompouce or tompoes, is iconic, and the Dutch market shows little variation in form, size, and colour. A tompouce is a rectangular bar of about 15 cm x 5 cm x 4 cm. It consist of two layers of puff pastry sandwiching crème patisserie. The top pastry has a smooth and pink icing. During Koningsdag a variant is made with orange instead of pink icing.

Mergpijpje is an elongated pastry consisting of cake, cream and jam or purée, covered with a white layer of marzipan that is dipped in chocolate on both ends. Similar pastry are the Swedish 'punsch-roll' and the Spanish 'hueso de santo' although both have widely different fillings.

Moorkop and the similar Bossche bol are large chocolate-glazed choux pastry spheres filled with whipped cream.

Aardbeienslof, literary 'strawberry slipper' is a popular pastry made from a soft, slightly crumbly base enriched with almond paste. It is typically topped with a layer of pastry cream, strawberries and whipped cream. The combination creates a rich, buttery texture balanced by light cream and the freshness of the fruit. Each year, a national competition is held in the Netherlands to determine the best strawberry slof.

==== Koek ====
The Netherlands is famous for its cookies, and one of the three top exporters of cookies in the world. The (American-) English word cookie, derives from Dutch koekje

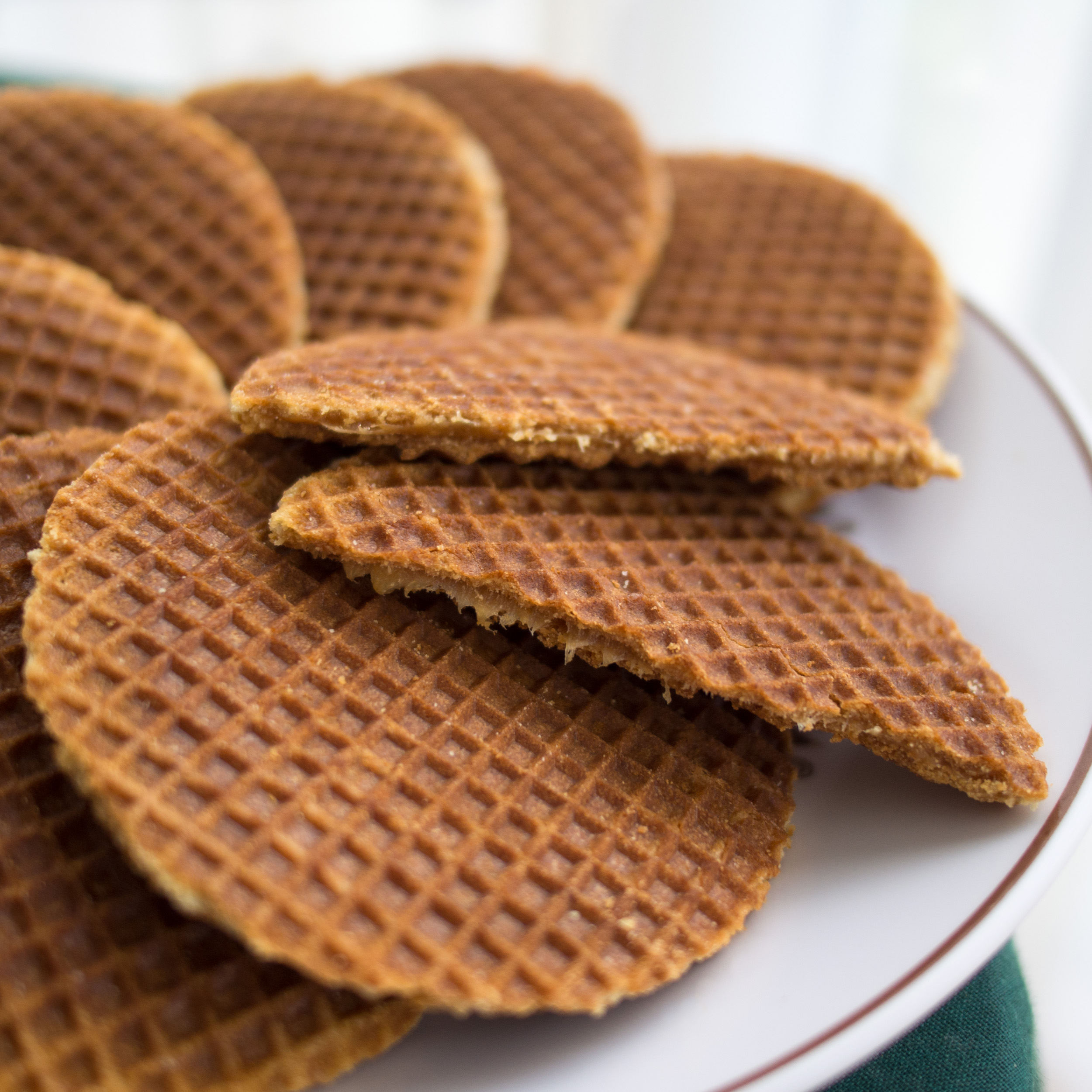
- Stroopwafel
  Stroopwafel, this iconic Dutch cookie is a thin waffle, made in a pizelle pan, is sliced horizontally and filled with a layer of syrup. It originates in the city of Gouda. Related cookies are the honingwafel, which has the stroop filling replaced by honey, and the stroopkoek, which has the waffle replaced by buttery and crisp biscuits.
- Speculaas
  Speculaas is a crisp biscuit flavoured with spices such as cinnamon, cloves, nutmeg and ginger and has a long history in the Netherlands. The dough is traditionally pressed into carved wooden moulds, producing figures, windmills or other images in relief. The biscuit was first recorded as ‘‘speculatie’’ in 1749, which could mean both ‘reflection’ and ‘pleasure’, perhaps referring to a delicacy or fanciful confection. German ‘‘Spekulatius’’ is an borrowing from Dutch and subsequently Latinised; the association with Latin ‘‘speculum’’ (‘mirror’) is probably a later reinterpretation. Belgian Dutch ‘‘speculoos’’ (borrowed in French as ‘‘spéculoos’’) is a Brabantian pronunciation of ‘‘speculaas’’, but now commonly denotes a caramelised variant without the traditional spice mixture. Lotus popularised this biscuit internationally as ‘‘Biscoff’’, a blend of ‘‘biscuit’’ and ‘‘coffee’’.
- Gevulde koek, a very popular round cookie made from butter dough and with a moist almond paste filling. It has a diameter of about 10 centimeters and is decorated with an almond. Almond paste was first seen in a Dutch recipe book in 1510. Cheaper, mass-produced variants often contain a filling of persipan. Similar cookies with different shapes are called kano and rondo.
- Bitterkoekje, is an iconic small round, semi-hard cookie based on a mix of sweet and bitter almonds (or today often apricot pips). It was traditionally served when a couple got married. The sweet (sugar) and the bitter (bitter almonds) symbolized marriage, with its highs and lows.
- Krakeling, a traditional Dutch biscuit shaped in a pretzel loop, and described as cookie in the Dutch language as early as 1397. It is made from a butter-based dough and finished with coarse sugar or almonds and has a distinctly crisp texture, hence its name: krakeling, or 'crispy one'. It has a sweet flavour, setting it apart from its savoury European and American counterparts.
- Spekkoek
  Spekkoek, cake with many layers, hence its name, as the layers reminds of the layers in spek (bacon). It originated in the Dutch Indies, and is based on the Indonesian lapis legit.
- Sprits or botersprits, a traditional Dutch butter biscuit made from a soft, pipeable dough that is deposited in ridged shapes onto a baking tray and baked until crisp. It occurs in Dutch since the 16th century and is linked to the city of Utrecht. The name derives from the German 'spritzen' ("to pipe"), referring to the shaping technique that was imported from Germany, where a similar cookie is known as Spritzgebäck.
- Roze koek, cake with pink fondant
- Eierkoek, round, slightly domed structure with a soft, springy texture. Its crumb is uniform and spongy, with a smooth surface and a lightly chewy bite. It feels light and moist without being sticky or wet.
- Bokkenpootje, a Dutch classic of two crisp almond meringue fingers with a creamy filling and chocolate-dipped ends.
- Kletskop, traditional lace cookie originally from 16th century Leiden, made with caramelized sugar and almonds, known for its thin, crisp texture.
- Janhagel, traditional rectangular, brittle cookie, seasoned with cinnamon, covered with granulated sugar (the hagel) and usually almond shavings.
- Jodenkoek, a large, thin, round buttery biscuit with a crisp and crumbly texture.
- Weesper mop, a traditional cookie originally from the city of Weesp, made from ground almonds, sugar, and egg white, baked into a chewy, slightly crisp almond biscuit.
- Oma's cake or roombotercake, is a traditional Dutch butter pound cake characterized by its simple 1:1:1:1 ratio of flour, butter, sugar, and eggs. Beyond its role as a household staple, the cake is central to the Dutch funeral ritual of koffie met cake, where it is served alongside coffee as a humble symbol of comfort and collective mourning during post-service gatherings.
- Duimpje, a small, thumb-sized Dutch biscuit traditionally made from a firm dough flavoured with spices and nuts. While the anise-and-hazelnut Frisian variant (dúmkes) is the most famous throughout the Netherlands, distinct regional versions exist across the Wadden Islands and other provinces under local names like tumke, toemke, or dímke.
- Zandgebak or zandkoekje, is a Dutch butter cookie with a crisp, sandy crumb, typically flavored with vanilla or lemon zest. It sits in the same family as Scottish shortbread and French sablé with shortbread being the plainest and most crumbly, sablé the most refined and melt-in-the-mouth, and zandkoekje landing somewhere in between.
- Café Noir, iconic crispy cookie with a layer of coffee-flavored glaze since the early 20th century, most famously produced by the Dutch biscuit manufacturer Verkade.
- Lange vingers, (literally "long fingers") are the Dutch version of the internationally known Ladyfingers or Savoiardi. These light, airy, finger-shaped sponge biscuits are a cornerstone of both Dutch snacking and dessert construction.
- Local cookies: many cities or regions have their own cookie or sweet. Some examples: IJzerkoekje (city of Vlaardingen), Drabbelkoek (city of Sneek), Amsterdamse korstjes (North Holland), Arnhemse meisjes, (city of Arnhem) and Amsterdamse koggetjes (city of Amsterdam)
- Spiced rye cakes: Ontbijtkoek, and regional variations: oudewijvenkoek, kandijkoek, gemberkoek, kruidkoek, Groninger koek, Deventer koek, kruidkoek, and Venlose Peperkoek.
- Boiled batter-based cakes: Poffert or Ketelkoek (usually with raisins) from Groningen, Trommelkoek (from Texel), Jan in de zak or Broeder (from West-Friesland) and Roti koekoes (a variety of the former Dutch Indies)
- Yeast-based sweet breads: Zeeuwse bolus, Friese sûkerbôle, Limburgs suikerbood, Twentse Krentenwegge (an elongated rich raisin bread)

==== Snoep ====
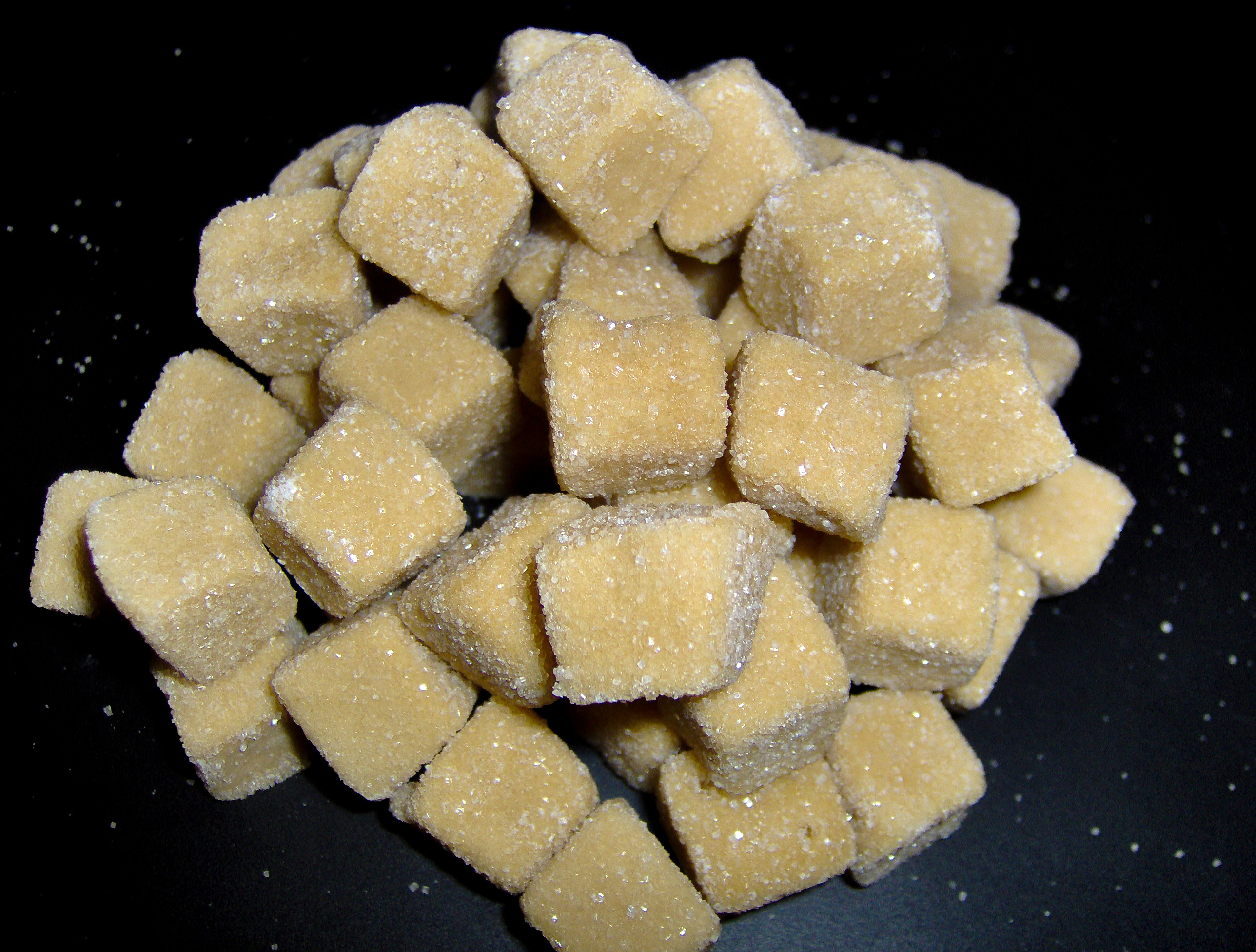
Griotten, a Dutch liquorice

The Netherlands is one of the world's leading exporters of candy and chocolate. The Dutch favor drop: liquorice. The Dutch are the highest consumers of liquorice in the world, and the largest producer of the liquorice candy in the European Union, making up one-third of all EU liquorice production. There are over 80 kinds of drop sold in shops over the country. The four types of drop are soft sweet (including fruitdrop), soft salt, hard sweet (katjesdrop), and hard salty (zoute snippers). Zoute drop, or salty liquorice comes in regular and double salty. When they are flavoured with coconut fondant they are called Engelse drop (liquorice allsorts). Other varieties are made with honey (honingdrop), salmiac (salmiakdrop), or bay laurel (laurierdrop). Typical shapes of Dutch drop are diamonds, ovals, oblongs, and coins (known as munten in Dutch, leading to the name muntdrop). Some manufacturers have introduced speciality ranges where the drop is made in thematic shapes, the most notable are shapes of cars (autodrop), and shapes of farm animals and farm machinery (boerderijdrop).

Well known local Dutch candies are hopje from the city of the Hague and boterbabbelaar from the province of Zeeland. Well known also worldwide are mentos and fruittella, both inventions of Isaak van Melle who started the production of candies and toffees at Breskens in 1900.

=== Borreltijd and savouries ===
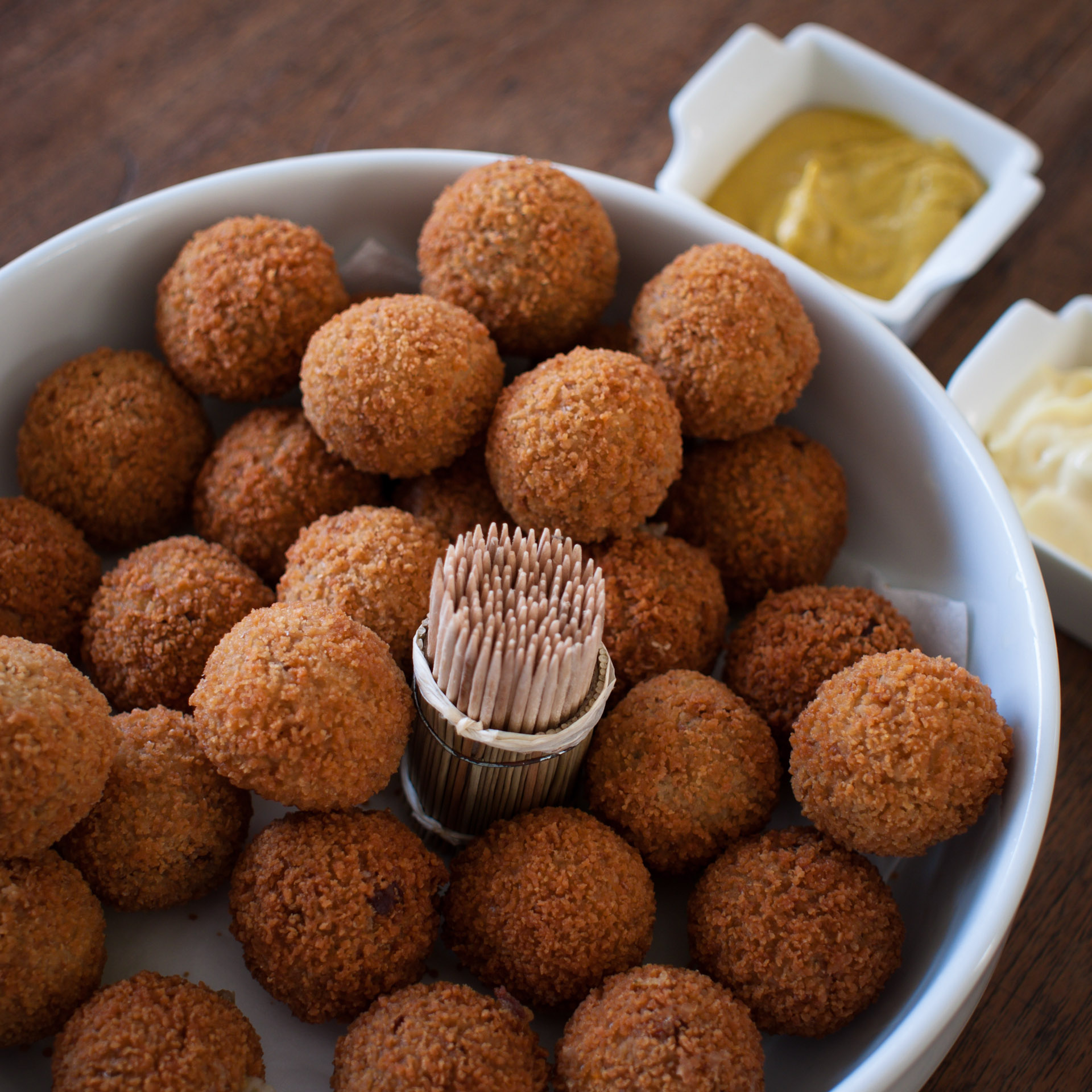
Bitterballen

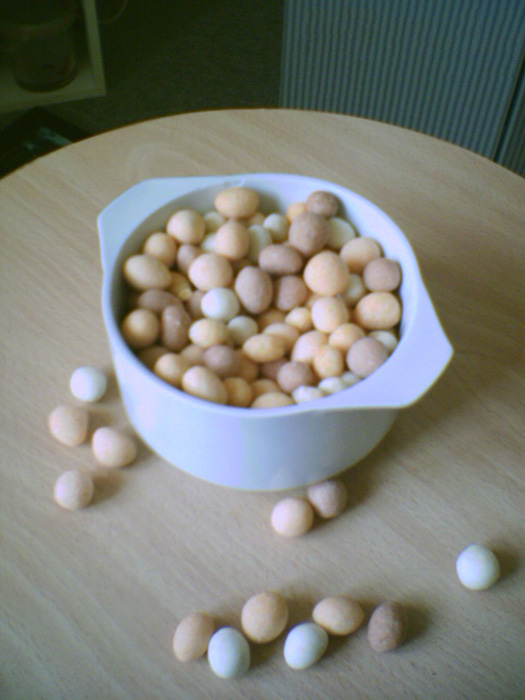
Borrelnootjes

Between 5:00 pm and 9:00 pm alcoholic beverage drinks (borrel), beer, wine or other drinks with savoury snacks are served in bars, at home or at the work space (cafetaria). Borrels are most frequently served at weekends or Friday afternoon. At more formal borrels bitterballen are served, a miniature variant of the kroket (croquette), deep-fried ragout-filled balls with a crunchy layer of bread crumbs. Bitterballen are served with mustard. Another hot borrel snack is vlammetje (deep-fried mini spring rolls with a very spicy minced meat filling). Borrelnootje (peanuts in a spiced crusty coating), cheese cubes and kaasstengels (crusty cheese sticks) are other typical borrel snacks.

In Dutch drinks, beer in particular lager plays a central role while wine plays only a modest role. Traditionally the spirit jenever was frequently consumed during drinks. Dutch beer market is dominated by three main producers (with main and subsidiary brands) with a regional preference. Heineken is most common in the west, Grolsch (owned by Asahi Breweries) in the east, and Bavaria in the south. Other common Dutch lager brands are Hertog Jan and Dommelsch (owned by AB InBev) and the independently brewed Gulpener and Budels. Imported Belgian Jupiler is also very common in the Netherlands.

Dutch cities had long brewing tradition. In the 20th century, the market consolidated when big brewers took over smaller breweries merging production in few production plants, and sometimes discontinuing brands. Since 1990 craft brewers have proliferated in the Netherlands, especially in North Brabant and Limburg which maintained a stronger beer tradition, with many different types of beer (not unlike beer in Belgium). In the 21st century, many new microbreweries were founded, brewing top fermenting beers in many different styles. In September 2013, there were 184 active breweries in the Netherlands. Popular styles include bock, trappist ale, stout, and wheat beer, while in the 2010s IPA varieties became very popular. Some of the most popular craft breweries in the Netherlands are Brouwerij 't IJ, Jopen, and Two Chefs brewing.

Common spirits include Jenever (originally distilled malt wine and the precursor to Gin, nowadays frequently made with industrially produced alcohol), Brandewijn (brandy) and Vieux an imitation Cognac. Of the bitters, Frisian spiced Beerenburg is the most famous, but also Kandeel (made from white wine), kraamanijs (anisette), oranjebitter (orange-flavored brandy, served on festivities surrounding the royal family), Advocaat, Boerenjongens (raisins in brandy), and Boerenmeisjes (apricots in brandy) are consumed.

=== Dinner ===
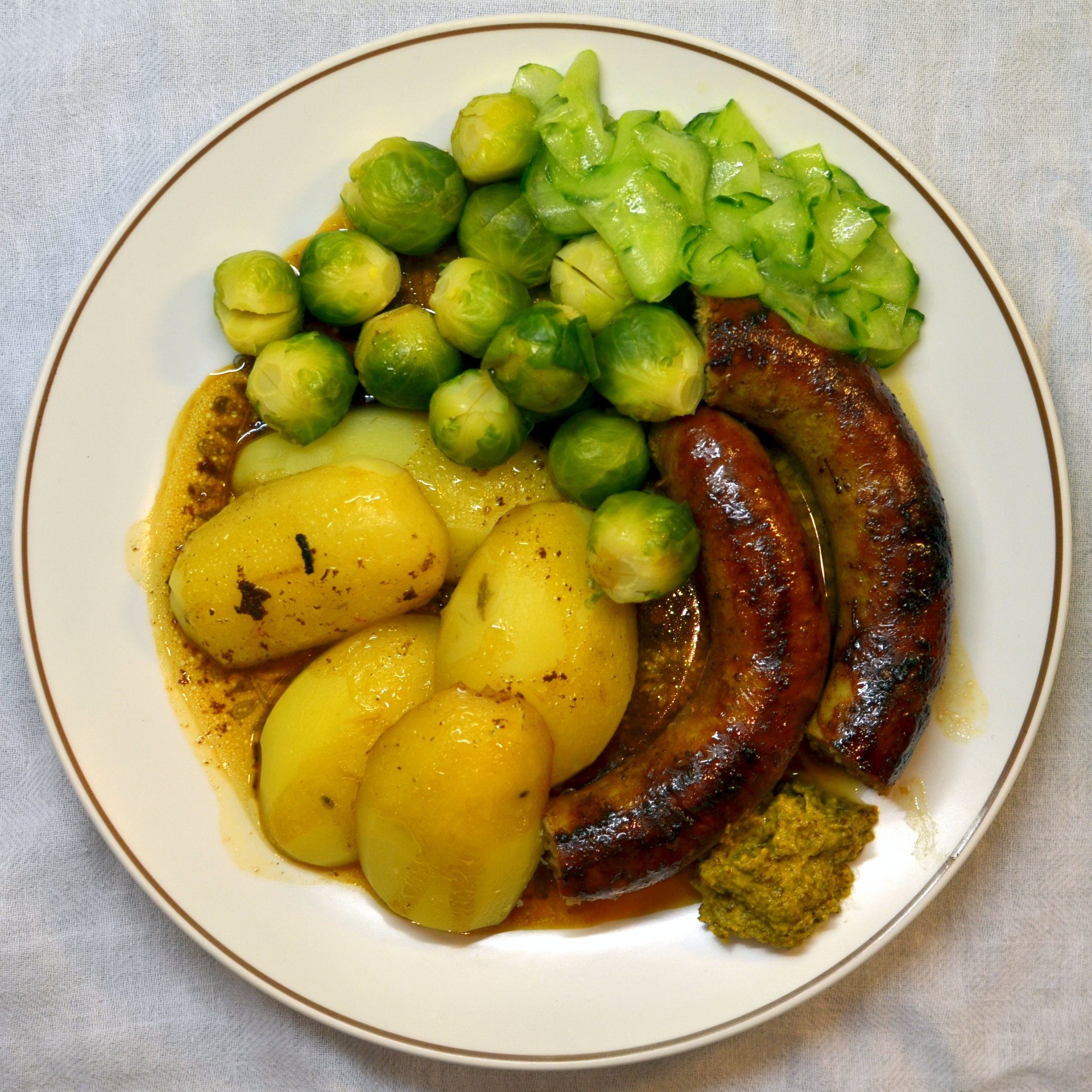
A traditional Dutch meal: meat, potatoes, and boiled vegetable

Dinner, traditionally served early by international standards, starts around or even before 6 p.m. The old-fashioned Dutch dinner for the lower class consists of one simple course: potatoes, meat and vegetables—known under the acronym "AVG" (aardappelen, vlees, groente). AVG consists traditionally of potatoes with a large portion of vegetables and a small portion of meat with gravy, or a potato and vegetable stew. Vegetable stews served as side dishes are for example rodekool met appeltjes (red cabbage with apples), or rode bieten (beetroot). Regular spices used in stews of this kind may be bay leaves, juniper berries, cloves, and vinegar, although strong spices are generally used sparingly. Stews are often served with pickles, including gherkins or cocktail onions (zilveruitjes). Due to the influx of other countries, traditional meals have lost some popularity. Stamppot, mashed potatoes with different options for vegetables, is traditionally eaten in winter. If there is a starter, it is usually soup.

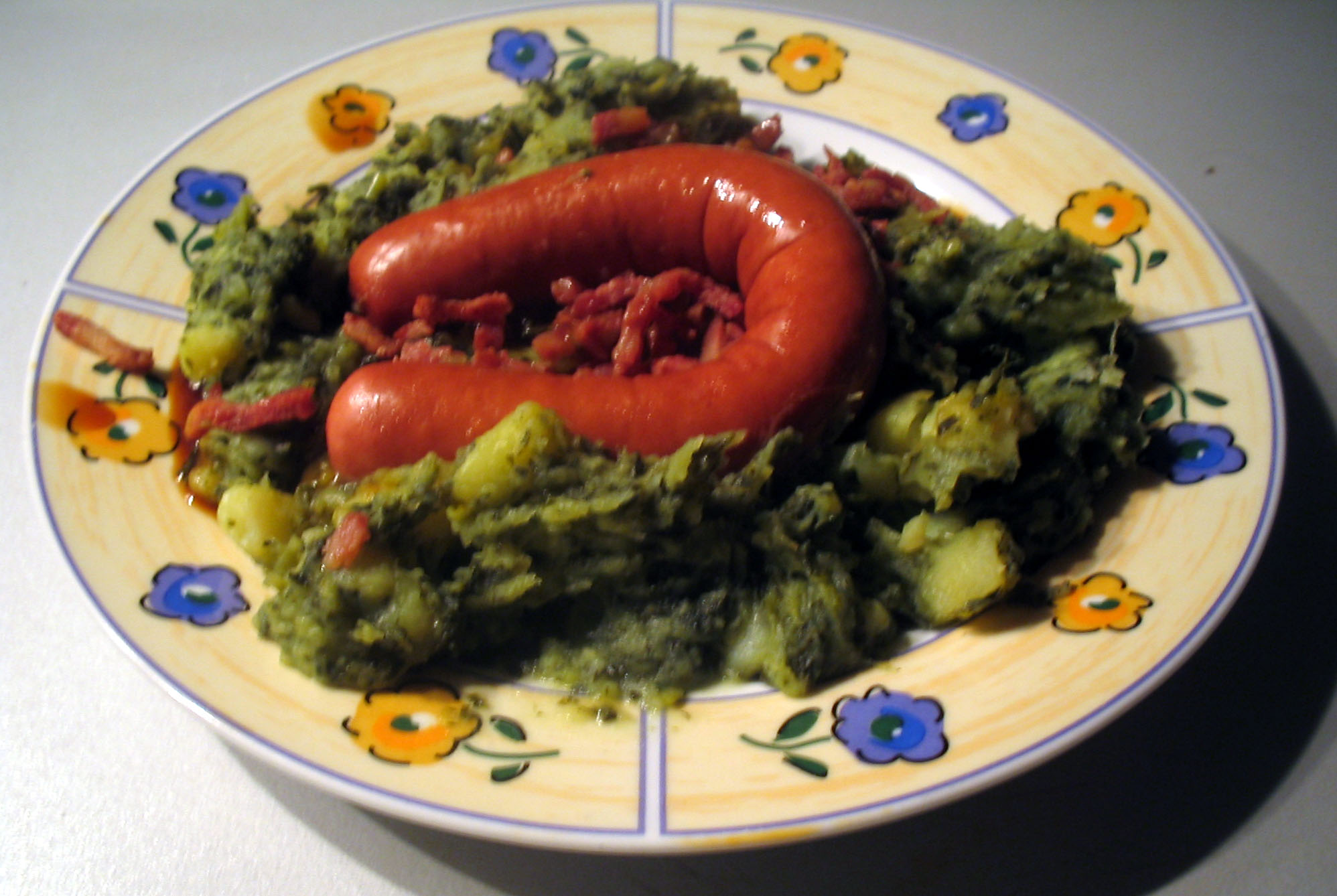
Boerenkoolstamppot with rookworst

The below-listed dishes have historic origins as meals for common labourers. From the 17th to the 19th century, labourers typically worked 10 to 16 hours a day on farms or in factories in unheated rooms; intended to replenish a labourer's energy, these meals are very heavy on calories and fat.

- Stamppot, boiled potatoes mashed with vegetables and served with meat and/or gravy, coming in a number of varieties:
  - Boerenkoolstamppot, curly kale (boerenkool) mixed with potatoes, served with bacon, gravy, mustard, and rookworst (smoked sausage). One of the more popular Dutch dishes, this is the classic stamppot, and thus when people only say 'stamppot' they mean the curly kale variant. Boerenkoolstamppot was mentioned in cookbooks as early as the year 1661. Mashed potatoes were not used in this dish at that time, but later on, after a few bad corn seasons, potatoes became popular as a replacement starch. Boerenkoolstamppot is high in carbohydrates, which makes it a popular meal for cold winter days.
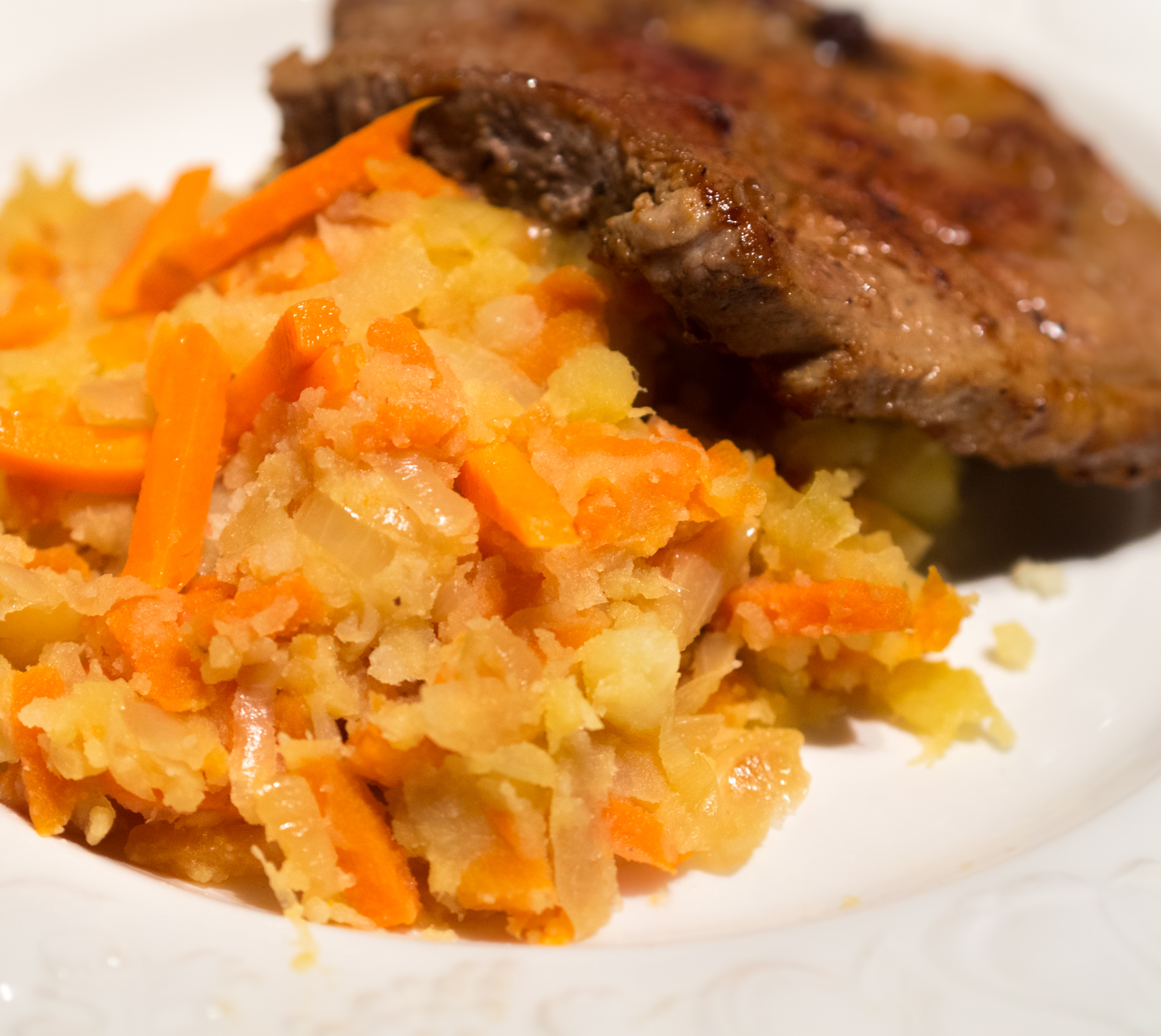
    Hutspot with karbonade
  - Hutspot, made with potatoes, carrots, and onions, served with slow-cooked karbonade (meat chop) and sometimes bacon or sausage. The gravy from the slow-cooked meat is poured into a dimple or kuiltje that is made within the hutspot after it has been plated. Before potatoes were introduced in Europe, hutspot was made from parsnips, carrots, and onions. The dish plays a central role during 3 October Festival in the city of Leiden.
  - Andijviestamppot, raw endive mashed with hot potatoes, served with diced fried spek (a kind of bacon).
  - Hete bliksem ("hot lightning"), boiled potatoes and apples, served with stroop (treacle) or diced speck.
  - Zuurkool, sauerkraut mashed with potatoes. Served with fried bacon or a sausage. Sometimes curry powder, raisins or slices of pineapple or banana are used to give a stamppot an exotic touch.
- Snert, is a very thick pea soup (erwtensoep) that can be served either as a main dish or as an appetizer and is traditionally eaten during the winter. Snert includes pieces of pork and rookworst and is almost a stew rather than a soup. It is often said that "you should be able to stand a wooden spoon upright in a pot good pea soup". It is customarily served with roggebrood (rye bread) spread with butter and topped with katenspek, a variety of bacon which is first cooked and then smoked. The meat from the soup may also be put on the rye bread and eaten with mustard.
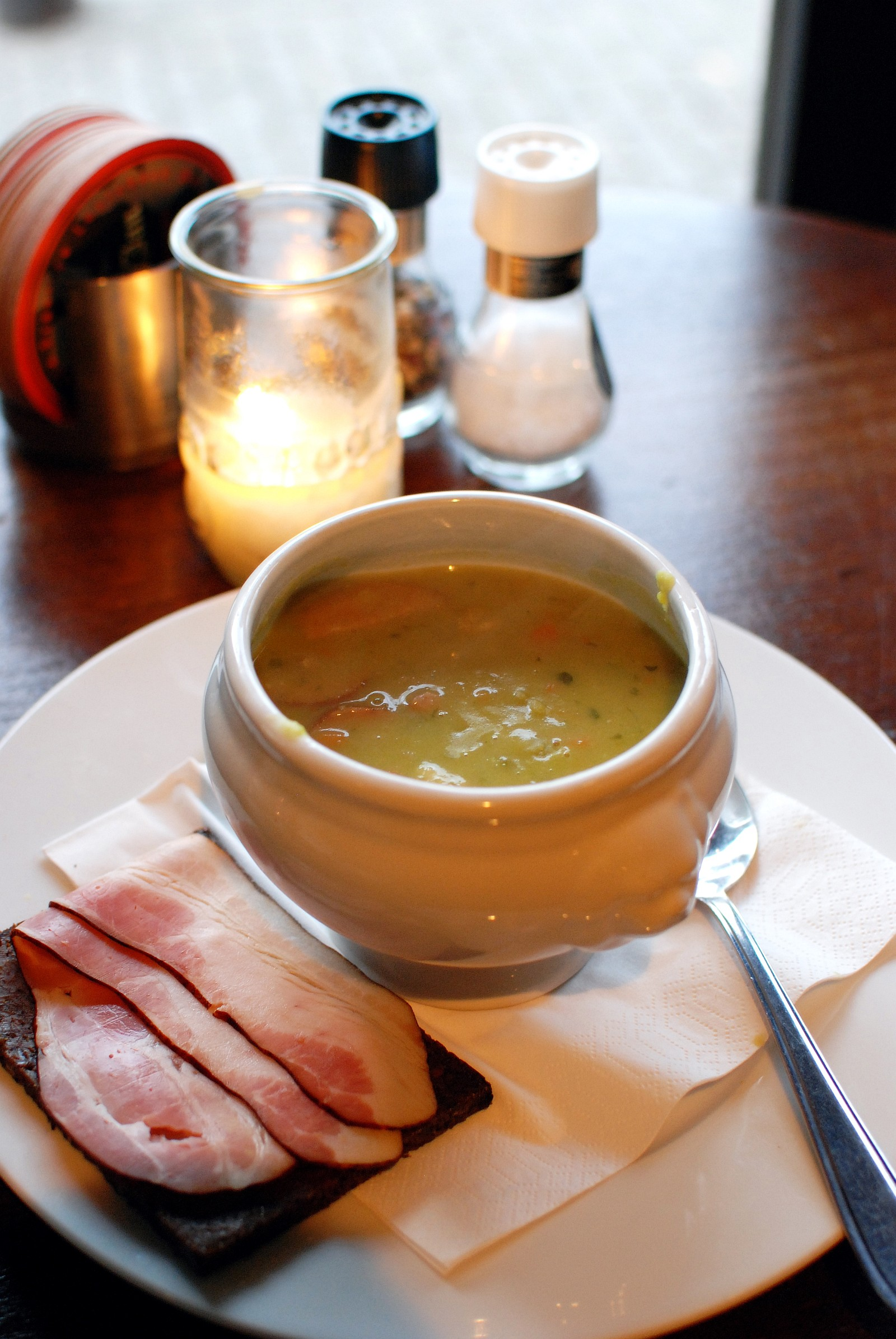
  Snert with rye bread

==== Meat dishes ====
- Gehaktballen (meatballs, usually half pork, half beef).
- Draadjesvlees Slow cooked beef meat usually with bay leaves and some stroop added, with red cabbage and potatoes
- Slavink, minced meat wrapped in bacon.
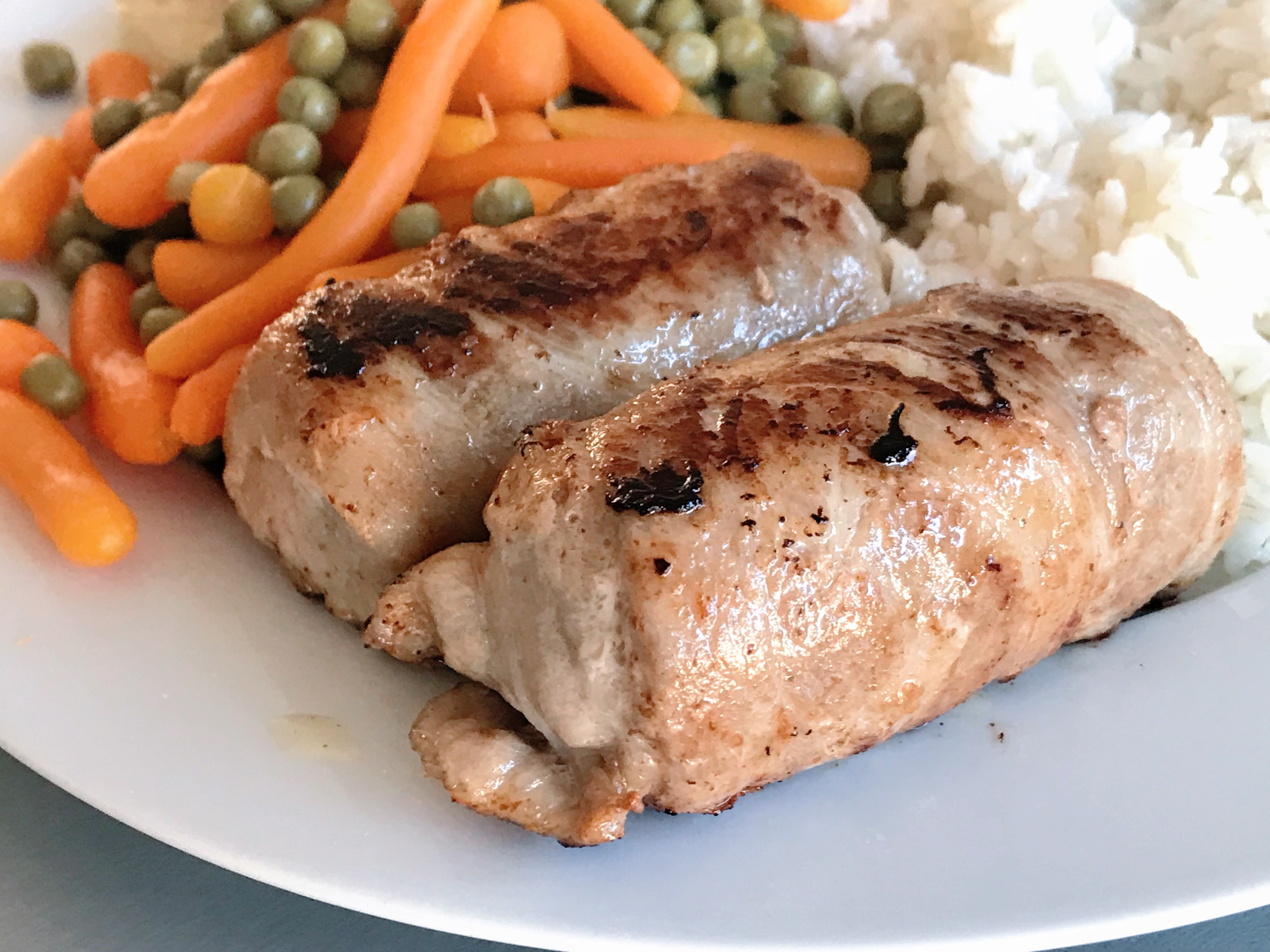
  Slavink
- Balkenbrij, a type of liverwurst and meatloaf. The butter-based gravy (boterjus) in which the meat has been fried or cooked is also served. A variant of this, eaten around the IJsselmeer, is butter en eek, where vinegar is added to the gravy.

==== Flour and dairy dishes ====
- Pannenkoeken, large and thin pancakes with bacon, apples, cheese, or raisins
- Poffertjes, miniature-sized pancakes made with a batter that contains yeast. They are made in a special poffertjespan and served with butter and powdered sugar.
- Spekdik, a variant of the pancake made in a waffle iron with bacon
- Wentelteefjes (French toast)
- Rijstekoekje
- Volendamse Dikke koek

==== Seafood ====
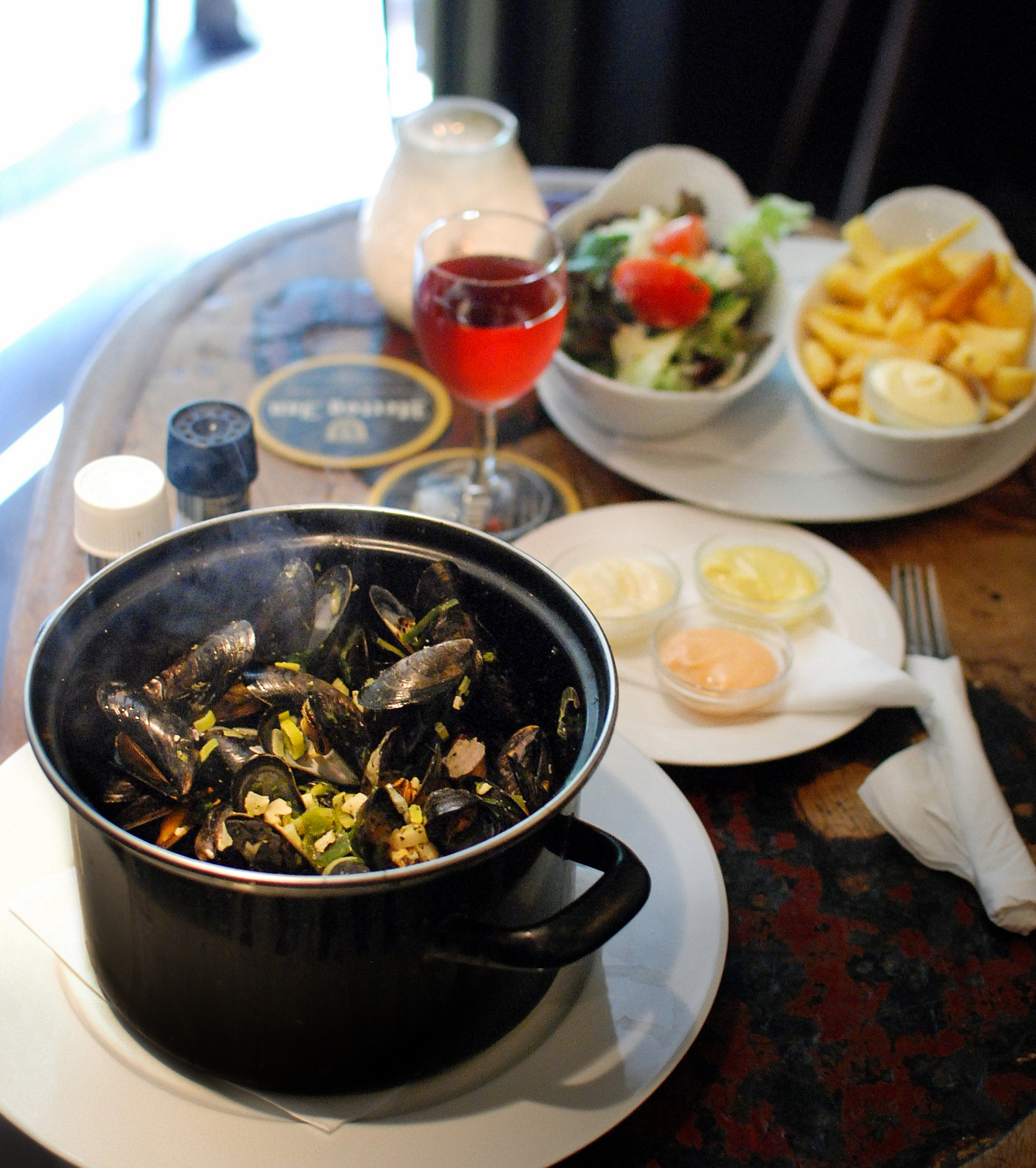
Mosselen met friet

- Zeeuwse mosselen (a mussel dish, so called because mussels are cleaned and sold in Yerseke in the province of Zeeland), commonly steamed in white wine (sometimes with butter and herb) and served in the shell with friet (French fries).
- Kibbeling, chunks of cod (but often replaced by cheaper white oceanfish) that are battered and fried. It is a popular street food.

=== Toetje ===
Toetje, or the final course, is a sweet dessert, traditionally yogurt with some sugar or vla, a thin milk pudding (cooked milk with custard). Vla comes in a variety of flavours; the most common ones are chocolate and vanilla.

- Vla, a smooth custard like dessert, comes in several flavours, the most popular ones are vanilla, chocolate and a thicker variant: hopjesvla, inspired by Haagse Hopjes and has a caramel and coffee flavor.
- Vla-flip, vanilla vla mixed with yogurt

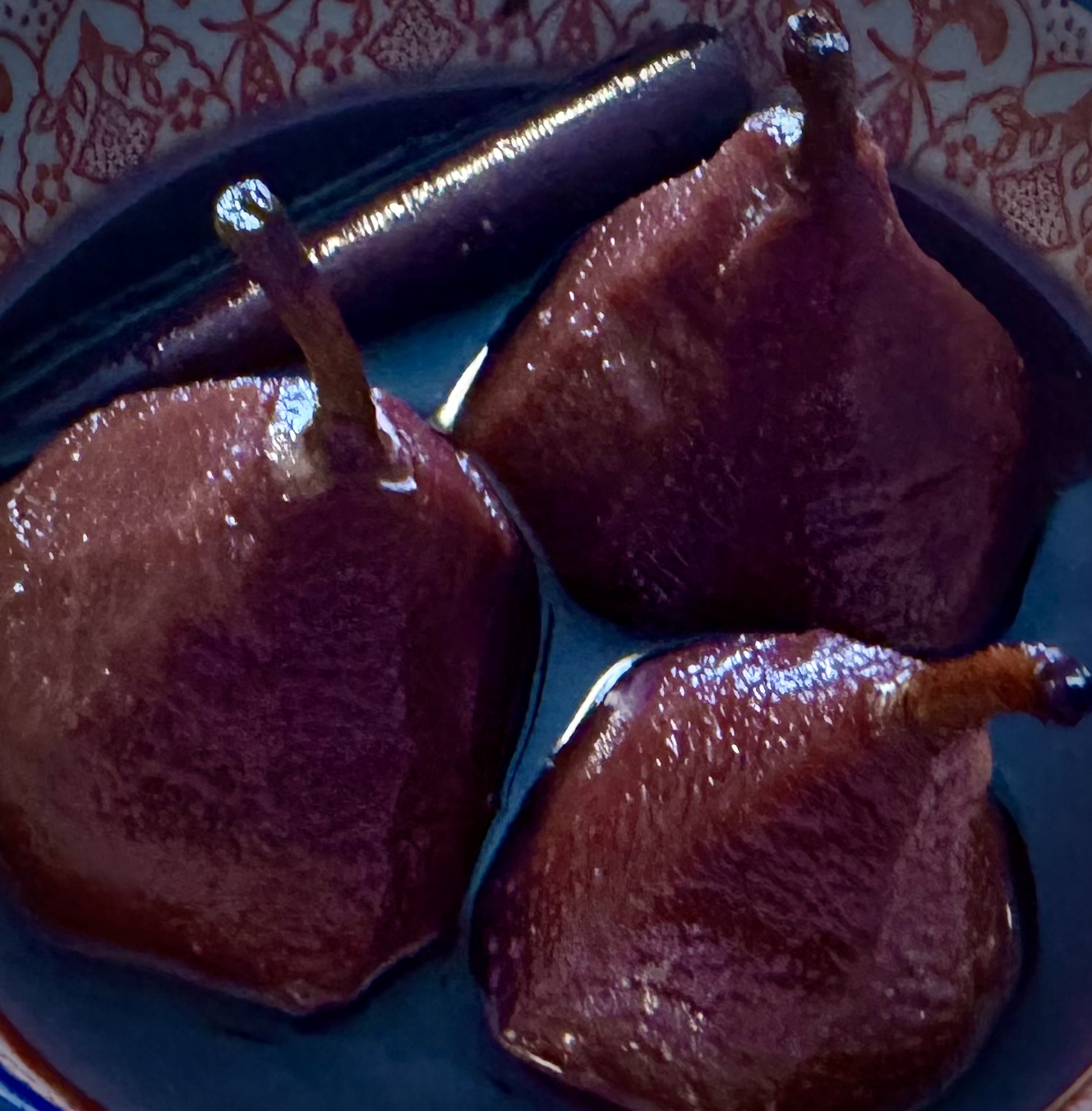
Stoofpeertjes

- Stoofperen, poached pears in spiced and sweetened red wine. Eaten with yoghurt as breakfast, with vanilla or cinnamon ice cream as dessert, or warm with the main course as vegetable, particularly around Christmas. Hard pears are used, predominantly the Gieser Wildeman cultivar.
- Broodpap, a bread porridge made from old bread, milk, butter, and sugar
- Bitterkoekjespudding, pudding based on bitterkoekje
- Griesmeelpudding met rodebessensaus (semolina pudding served with currant coulis) has been so popular in the Netherlands, that it is thought of as typically Dutch. But other varieties of semolina pudding are popular in the whole of Northern and Eastern Europe. 'Gries' comes from German, where the pudding may have originated.
- Grutten (Groat)
- Haagse bluf, consists of stiffly beaten egg whites with sugar and berry juice without sugar. The name is a reference to the air that people of the Hague would adopt: it seems like a lot, but in fact it is largely air.
- Hangop, strained yogurt, garnished with rhubarb, other fruit or jam
- Karnemelkse bloempap and the gortepap variant
- Rijstebrij (rice pudding)
- Krentjebrij (also called watergruwel)
- Broeder, or Jan in de zak, a type of boiled pudding usually containing buckwheat, is a traditional dinner mainly in West Friesland
- Baked in a frying pan, mostly eaten as breakfast, lunch or dessert: Rijstekoekje and Volendamse Dikke koek.

== Special occasions ==
=== Birth and death ===
The birth of a child is an occasion for serving beschuit met muisjes (Dutch rusk covered with sugared aniseed). Originally pink, for a number of decades, the aniseeds are blue when the child is a boy and pink if it is a girl. Orange "muisjes" have been marketed for the birth of a royal since the birth of Beatrix in 1938. It is common to offer to all visitors of mother and child, and to bring them when announcing childbirth to peer (e.g.at the workplace). Traditionally, Dutch funerals are sober. Most commonly a slice of butter cake with a cup of coffee or tea is served after the service.

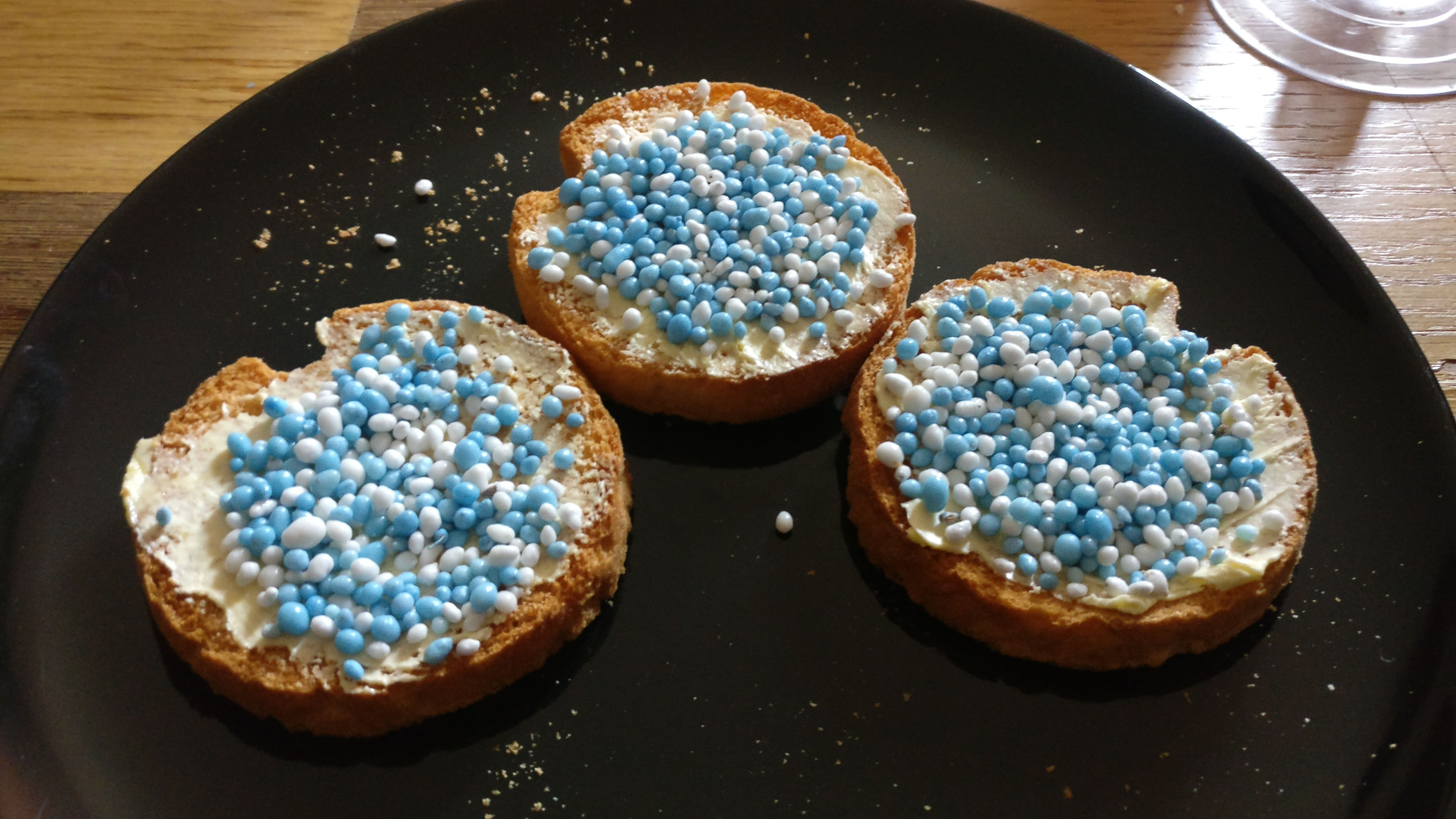
Beschuit met muisjes

=== Sinterklaas ===
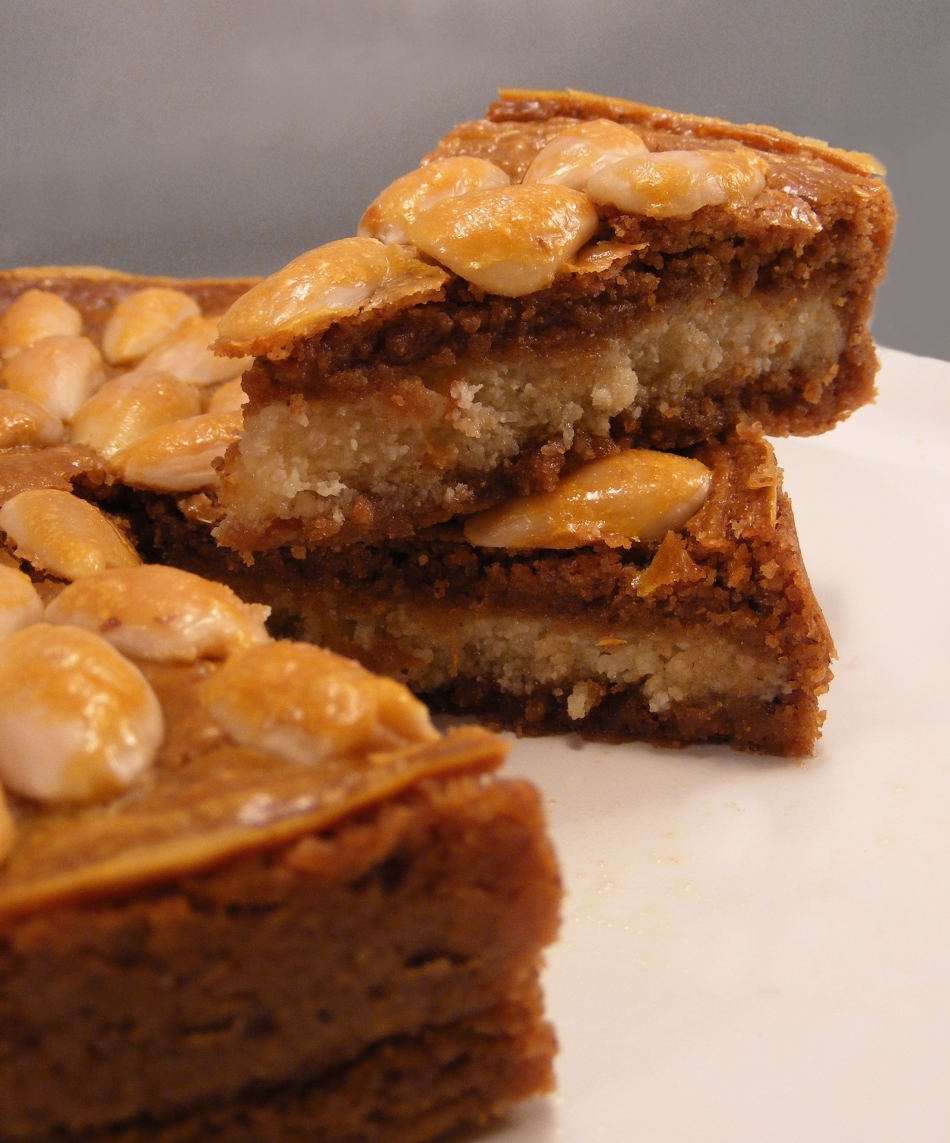
Gevulde Speculaas

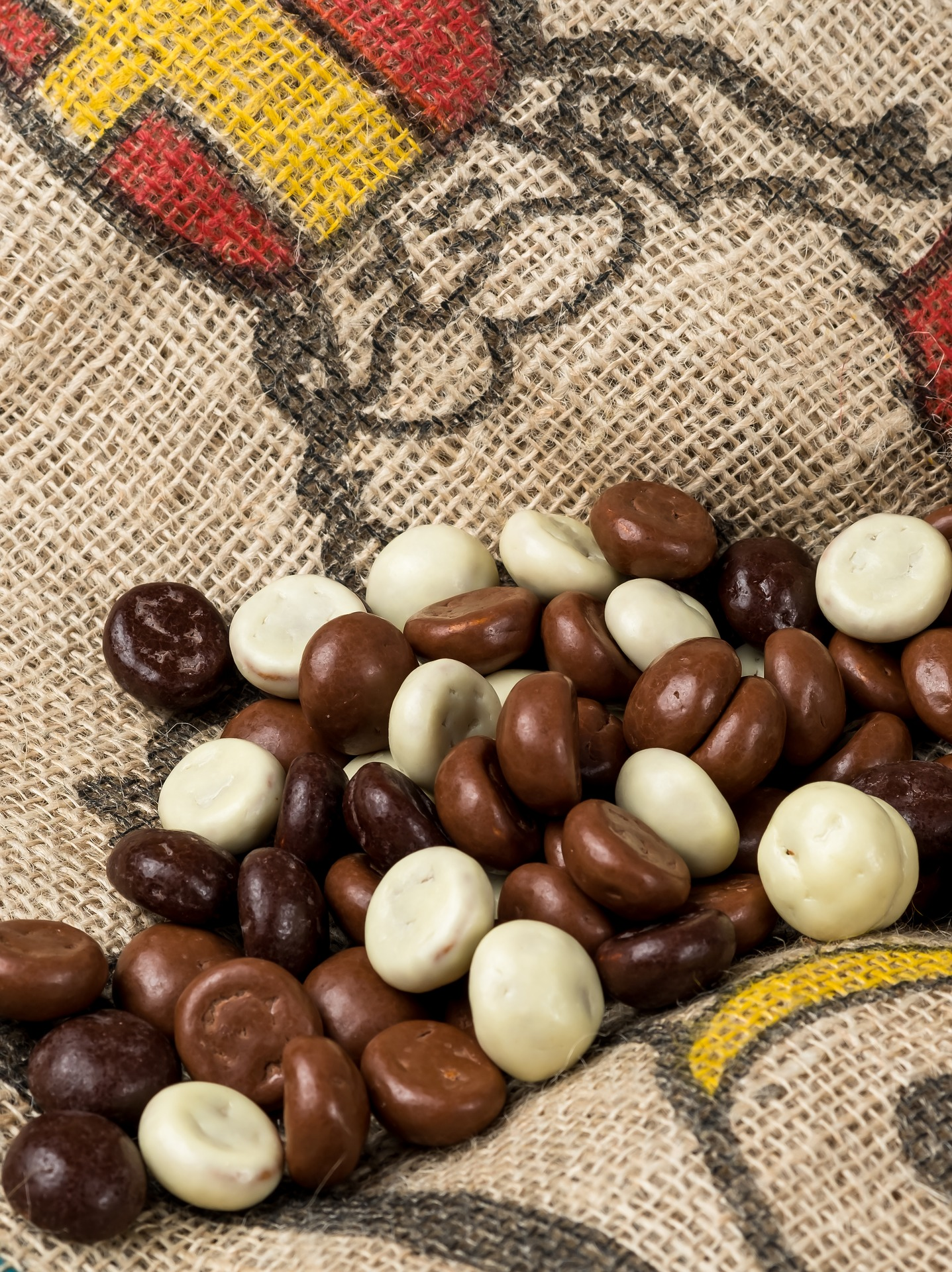
Chocoladekruidnoten

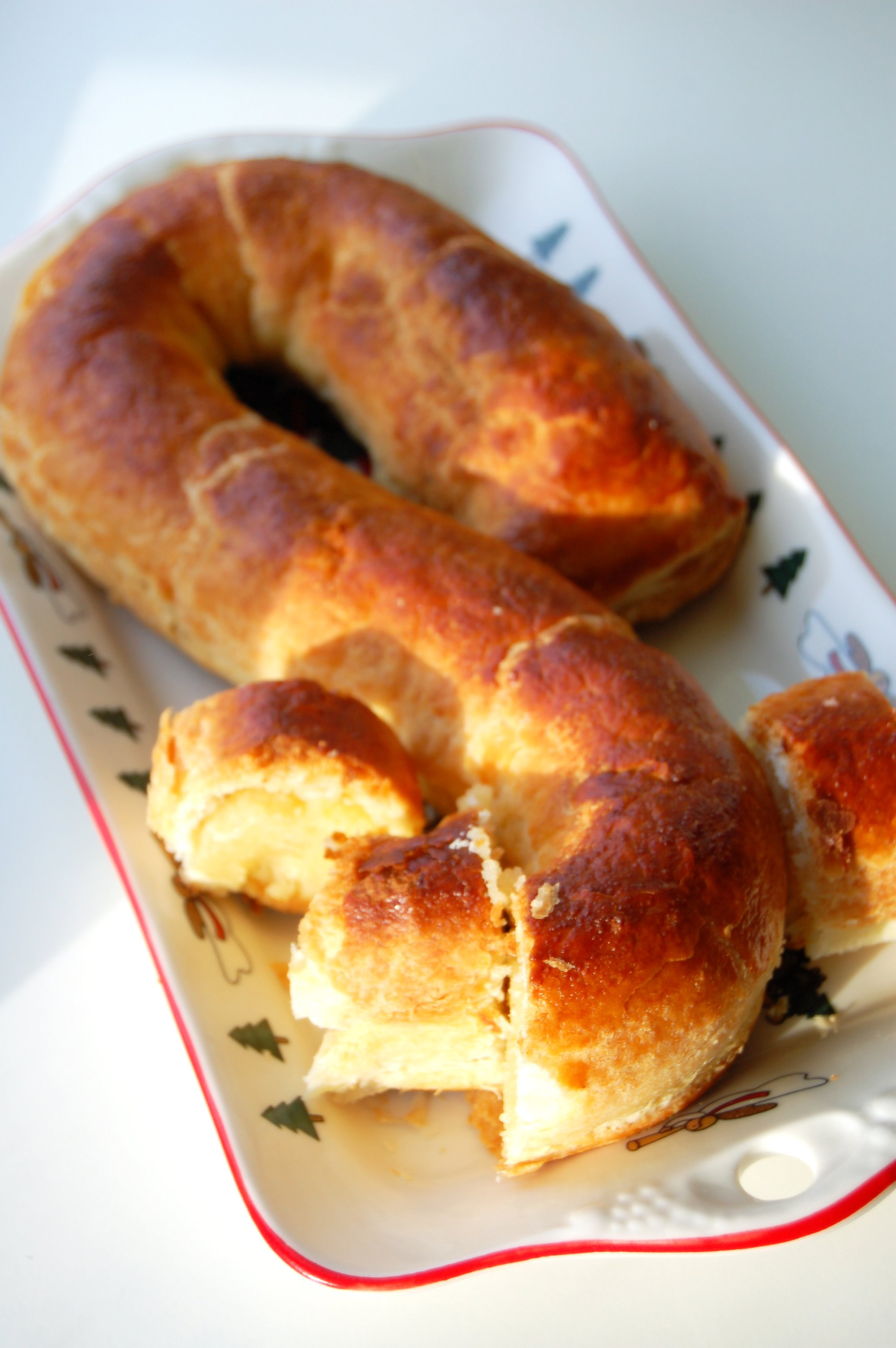
Boterletter shaped in the 'S' of Sinterklaas.

The Dutch festival of Sinterklaas is held on 5 December. Saint Nicholas leaves gifts in the children's shoes. On this occasion, the Dutch drink hot chocolate milk and eat luxury variants of speculaas: speculaasbrokken (thick speculaas chunks), gevulde speculaas (almond paste filled speculaas) and speculaas icecream. Spices in speculaas include cinnamon, cloves, nutmeg, cardamom and ginger. Also boterletter (a baked pastry crust with an almond paste filling and shaped into a letter S of Sinterklaas), marsepein (marzipan, in the shape of animals or other topical items), borstplaat (discs of a butter-based fondant); and taaitaai are eaten. And everyone receives a chocoladeletter (chocolate letter), corresponding with the first letter of the name of the receiver. Special treats distributed by Saint Nicholas' aide Zwarte Piet include pepernoten (irregularly shaped small cookies made of rye, honey and anise) and kruidnoten (gingernut-shaped biscuit but made with speculaas spices). The traditional kruidnoot has a specific flavor and texture, but over the years, various variants have also entered the market. Some examples of variants that have appeared in Dutch stores:

- Chocoladekruidnoten: These are kruidnoten covered with a layer of milk chocolate, dark chocolate, or white chocolate.
- Truffelkruidnoten: These have a rich chocolate flavor and are covered with a thin layer of cocoa powder.
- Gevulde kruidnoten: This variant has a filling in the center. Popular fillings include chocolate, caramel or marzipan.
- Yoghurtkruidnoten: These kruidnoten are coated with a layer of yogurt. They have a fresh and creamy taste.
- Koffiekruidnoten: These are kruidnoten with a subtle coffee flavor. They are often coated with a layer of coffee glaze.

=== Christmas ===
Christmas (Kerst) in the Netherlands is a typical family holiday. Traditionally there is family brunch with kerststol, a fruited raisin bread, often filled with almond paste and covered in powdered sugar. The bread and its name stol originate from Germany, and the name appeared for the first time in print in a Dutch newspaper in 1871. A popular sweet is kerstkransje. Christmas dinner is also a family occasion where rollade (a kind of roulade but without the filling, consisting of spiced pork), roast pork, game, or other luxury meat may be served. Another popular Christmas dinner tradition is gourmetten, where people cook on the dinner table their own food on a special gourmetset, although this is not limited to Christmas.

=== New year ===
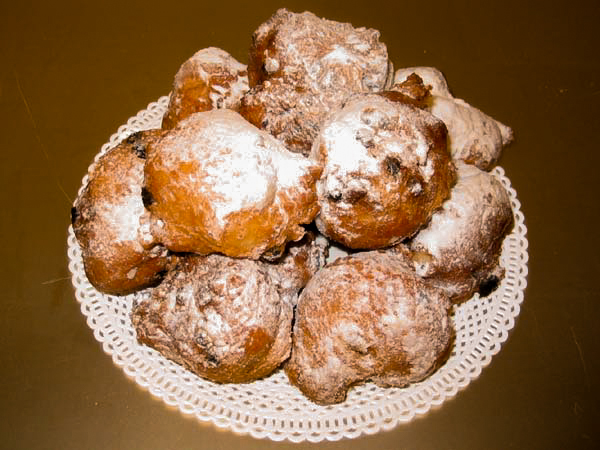
Oliebollen, a Dutch fried pastry, eaten on New Year's Eve

On New Year's Eve (Oud en Nieuw), Dutch houses smell of the piping hot oil of deep-fat fryers used to prepare oliebollen and appelbeignets (a kind of apple fritter) – not to be mistaken for the appelflap which are made of puff pastry. Also ananasbeignets (pineapple fritter) are considered a treat. Oliebollen are yeast dough balls, either plain or filled with glacé fruits, apple pieces, raisins, and sultanas are served with powdered sugar. They are sold by street vendors and bakeries, and the quality can vary by a land slide and every year an oliebollen contest is held. In the 17th century, Dutch settlers also took their oliebollen to the American colonies, where they are now known in a different form and recipe as doughnuts.

In Limburg, nonnevotten are sometimes served during New Year's Eve, although it is mostly eaten during Carnival. Around New Years knieperties are popular, in particular in the northern provinces.

=== Easter ===
Months before Easter (Pasen) shops are flooded with chocolate eggs. On average, the Dutch eat 47 chocolate easter eggs a year. Another popular dish eaten during Easter is Paasstol, which is the same kind of bread as the Kerststol.

== Fast food ==
=== Snack bars ===
The Dutch have their own types of fast food, sold at snack bars that mainly serve deep-fried fast food. French fries (called patat or friet) are served with one or a combination of sauces, most commonly:

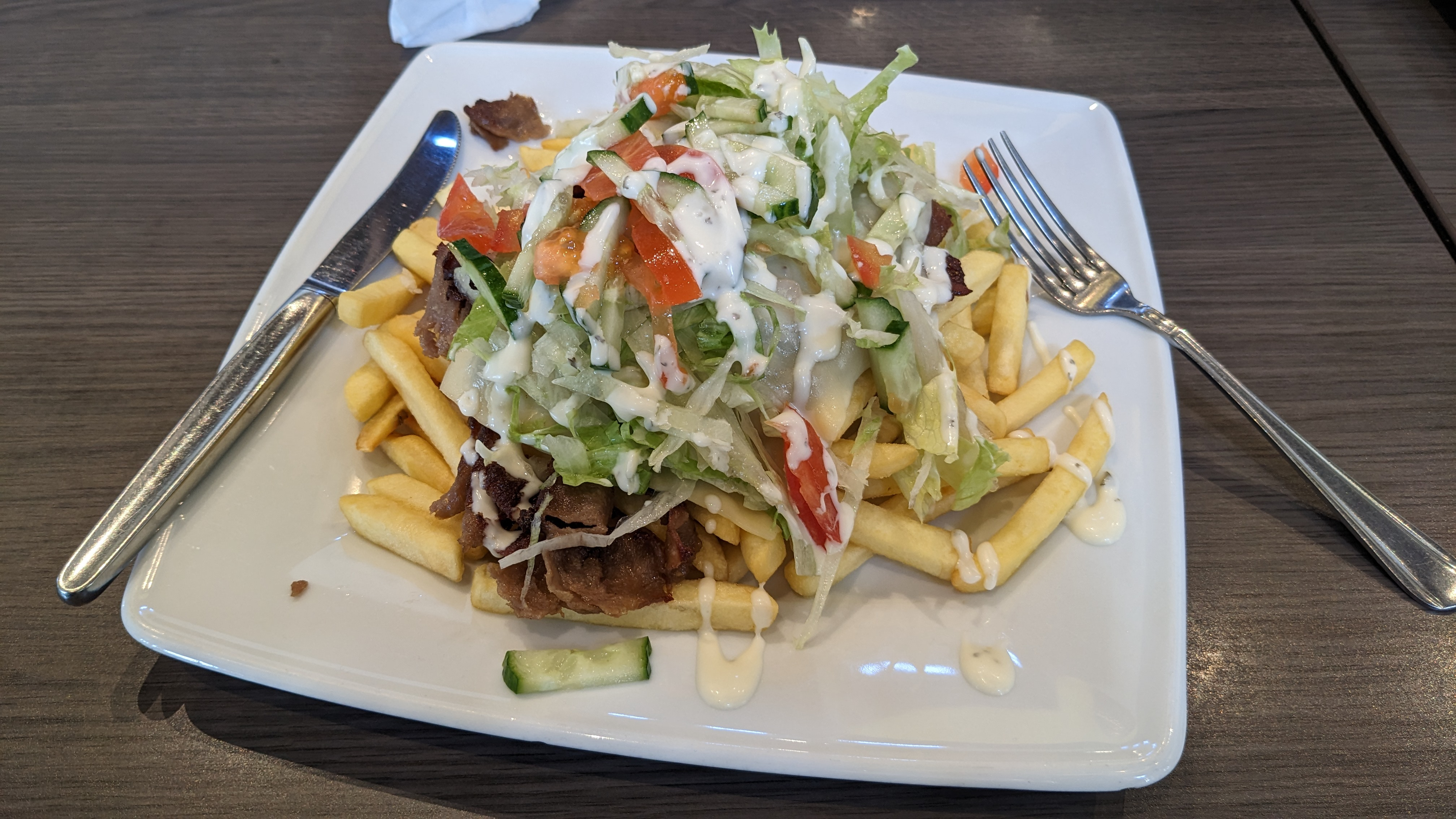
Kapsalon

- Patatje met (mayonnaise or fritessaus)
- Patatje pinda (peanut sauce)
- Patatje ketchup (or curry ketchup)
- Patatje speciaal (mayonnaise, spiced ketchup, chopped raw onions)
- Patatje oorlog (peanut sauce, mayonnaise, chopped raw onions)
- Patatje Joppie (Joppiesaus, a pickle relish of chopped vegetables and mild spices)
- Patatje kapsalon (fries, topped with either shawarma, kebab, or döner kebab, finished with salad, cheese, and various sauces such as sambal and garlic sauce)

Snacks made with meat are usually deep-fried. These include:

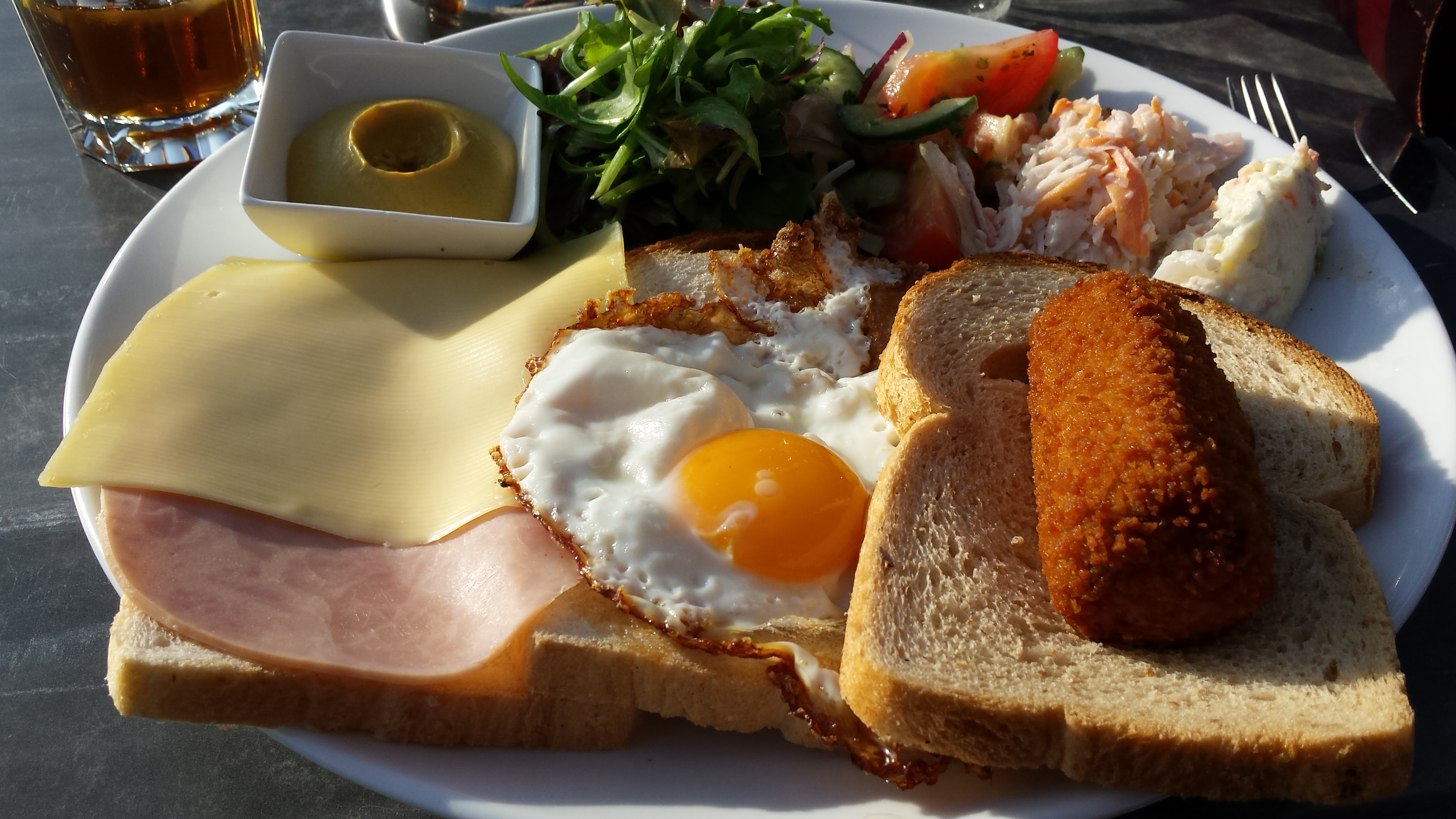
Broodje kroket and uitsmijter (ham, cheese and egg sandwich)

- Frikandel, deep-fried skinless minced meat sausage, the most commonly ordered fast-food snack in the Netherlands
- Kroket, deep-fried ragout roll covered in a thick crust, eaten with mustard; also available in bread rolls (broodje kroket). The two main varieties are rundvleeskroket (with beef) and kalfsvleeskroket (with veal). Vegan, cheese and satay versions are also available. The thick, crispy crust, the bigger size and the filling sets the Dutch kroket apart from the French croquette (from which it originated) and Spanish croquetas. An estimated 75 percent of all Dutch people eat them, resulting in 29 kroketten per person per year on average, being the second most commonly eaten Dutch snack after the frikandel. In some municipalities, members of the municipal council have the right to a kroket if a council meeting lasts until after 23:00. A bun with kroket (broodje kroket) is often eaten as lunch.
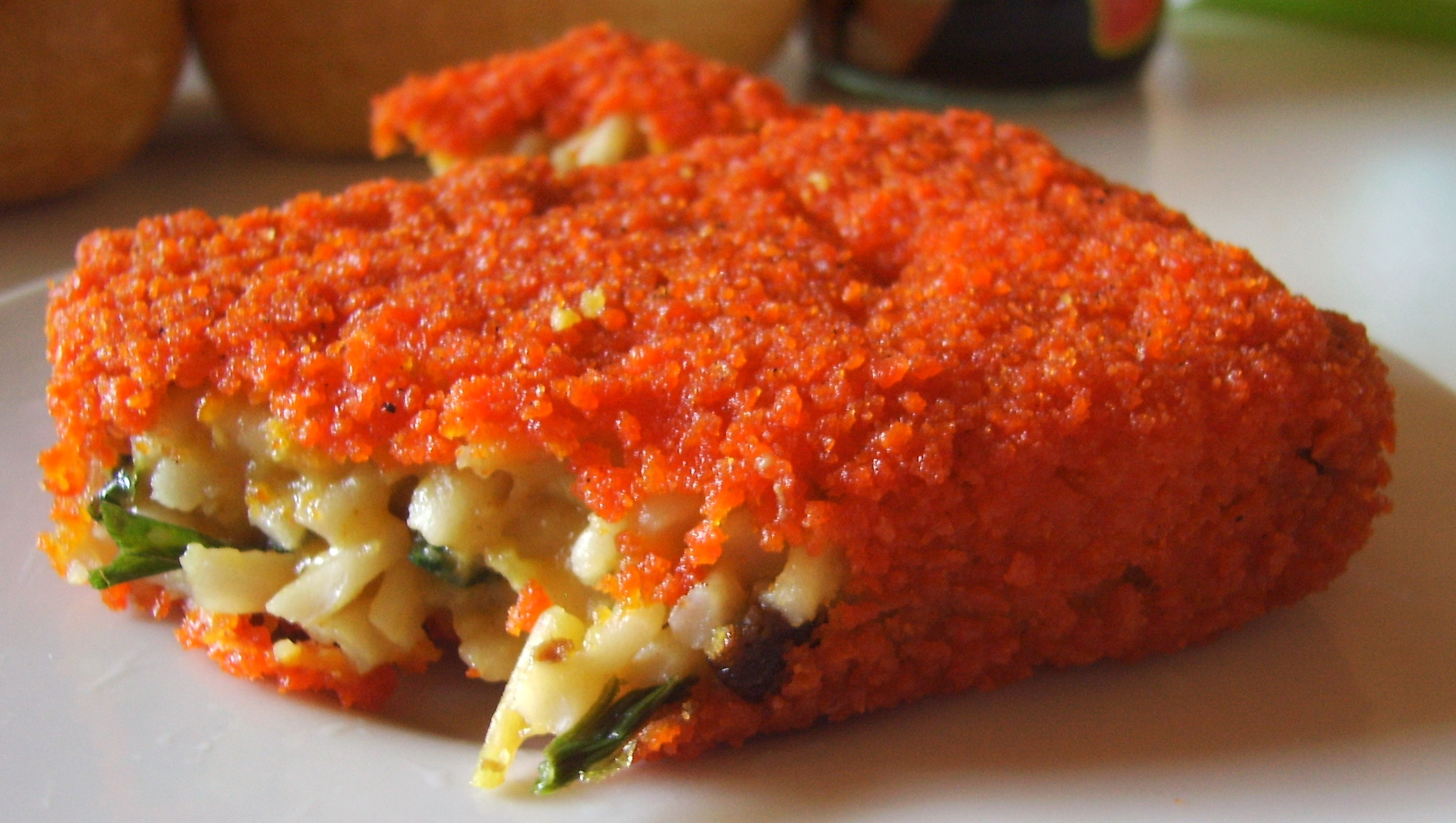
  Bamiblok
- Bamiblok and nasischijf, deep-fried disk- or square-shaped mie goreng or nasi goreng patties covered with bread crumbs
- Kaassoufflé, deep-fried puff pastry envelope with a small amount of cheese in the center
- Berenklauw, sliced meatball and fried onion rings on a wooden skewer, smothered in peanut sauce
- Kipcorn, deep-fried rod-shaped chicken or turkey meat slurry, breaded with a crust of corn or bread crumbs, served with ketchup, mayonnaise or curry sauce
- eierbal, regional (in the north and east of the country), a deep-fried egg in ragout

=== On the road ===
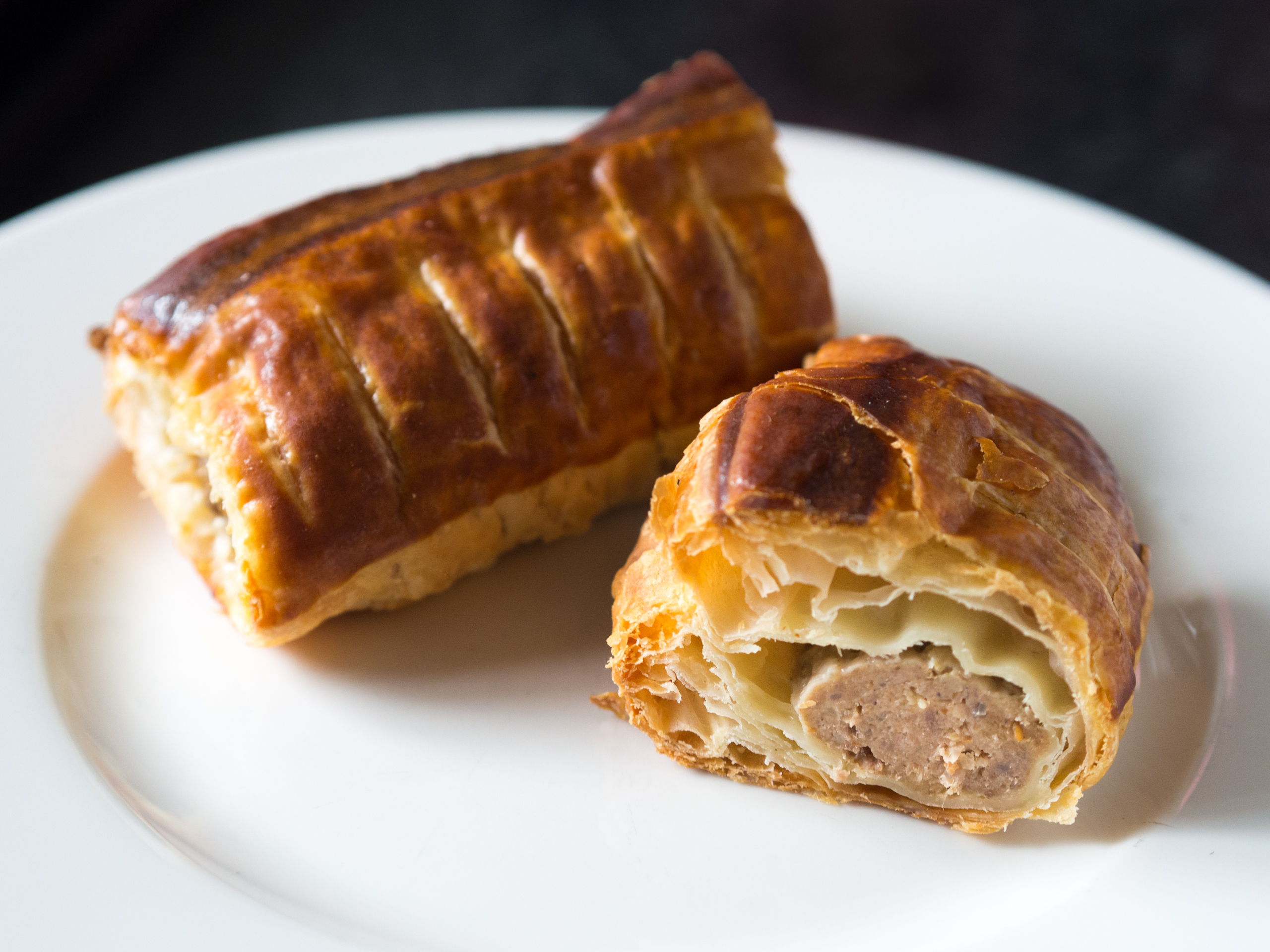
Saucijzenbroodje

- Saucijzenbroodje (a kind of sausage roll), with nutmeg-spiced minced meat baked in puff pastry, are sold in supermarkets, bakeries and kiosks.
- Brabants worstenbroodje, regional (Brabant), slightly spiced sausage baked in bread dough.

=== Fish stalls ===
- Hollandse nieuwe (soused herring), optionally served with chopped raw onions, which is eaten by lifting the herring high up into the air by its tail and then biting into it upwards (except for Amsterdam, where the herring is cut into pieces). Raw herring is also sometimes sold in a soft white bun.

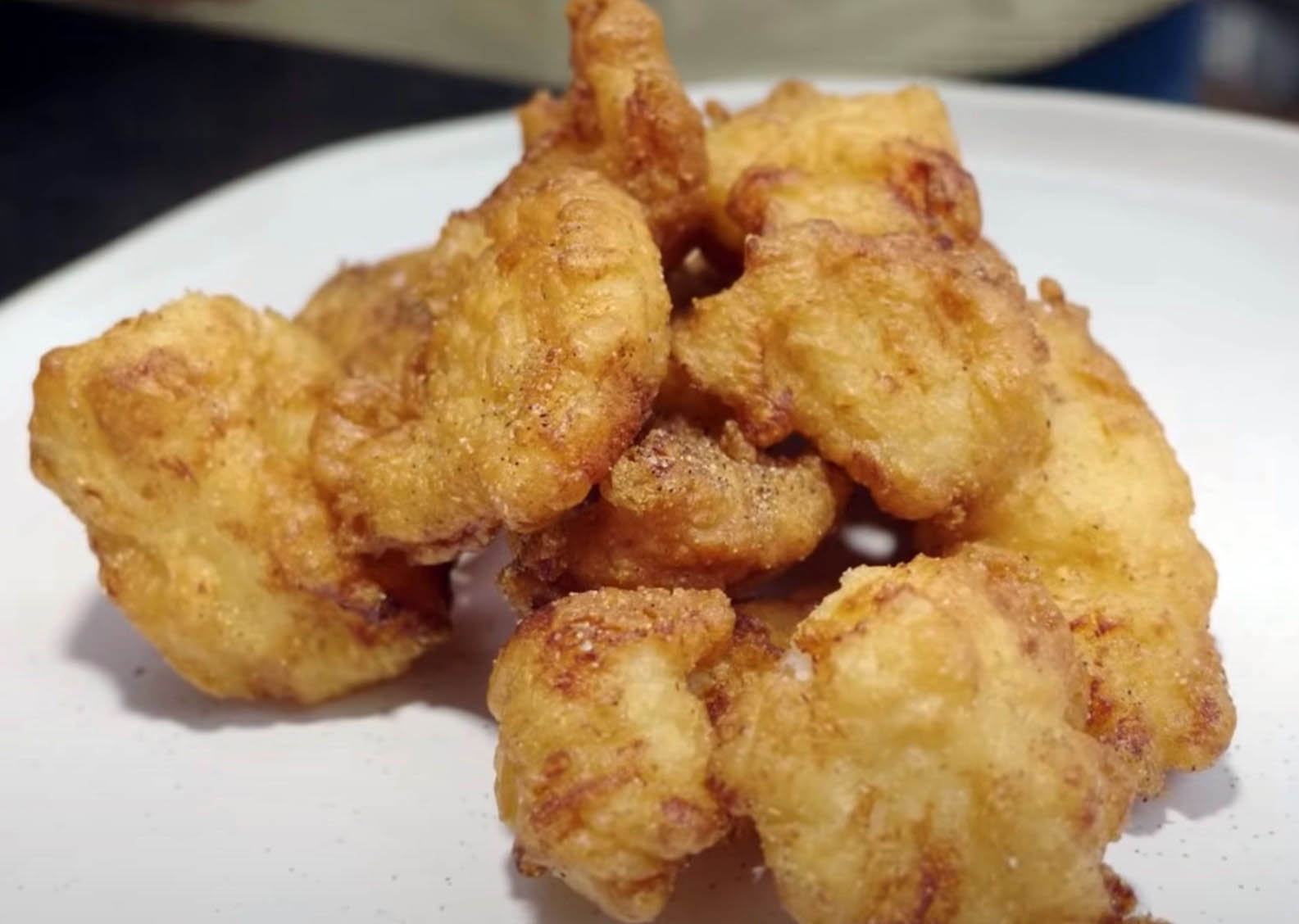
Kibbeling

- Kibbeling, deep-fried, nugget-sized chunks of (originally) Atlantic cod, but nowadays often replaced by other kinds of cheaper whitefish. It is often served with remoulade, ravigote sauce, garlic sauce or tartar sauce, and seasoned with a mix of ground herbs, such as coriander, pepper, paprika, garlic, and onion.
- Lekkerbekje, deep-fried cod (or other whitefish), similar to the fish served with British fish and chips, with a more tempura-like batter
- Gerookte paling (smoked European eel) has a long-standing tradition in the Netherlands, particularly around the IJsselmeer.

== Gallery ==
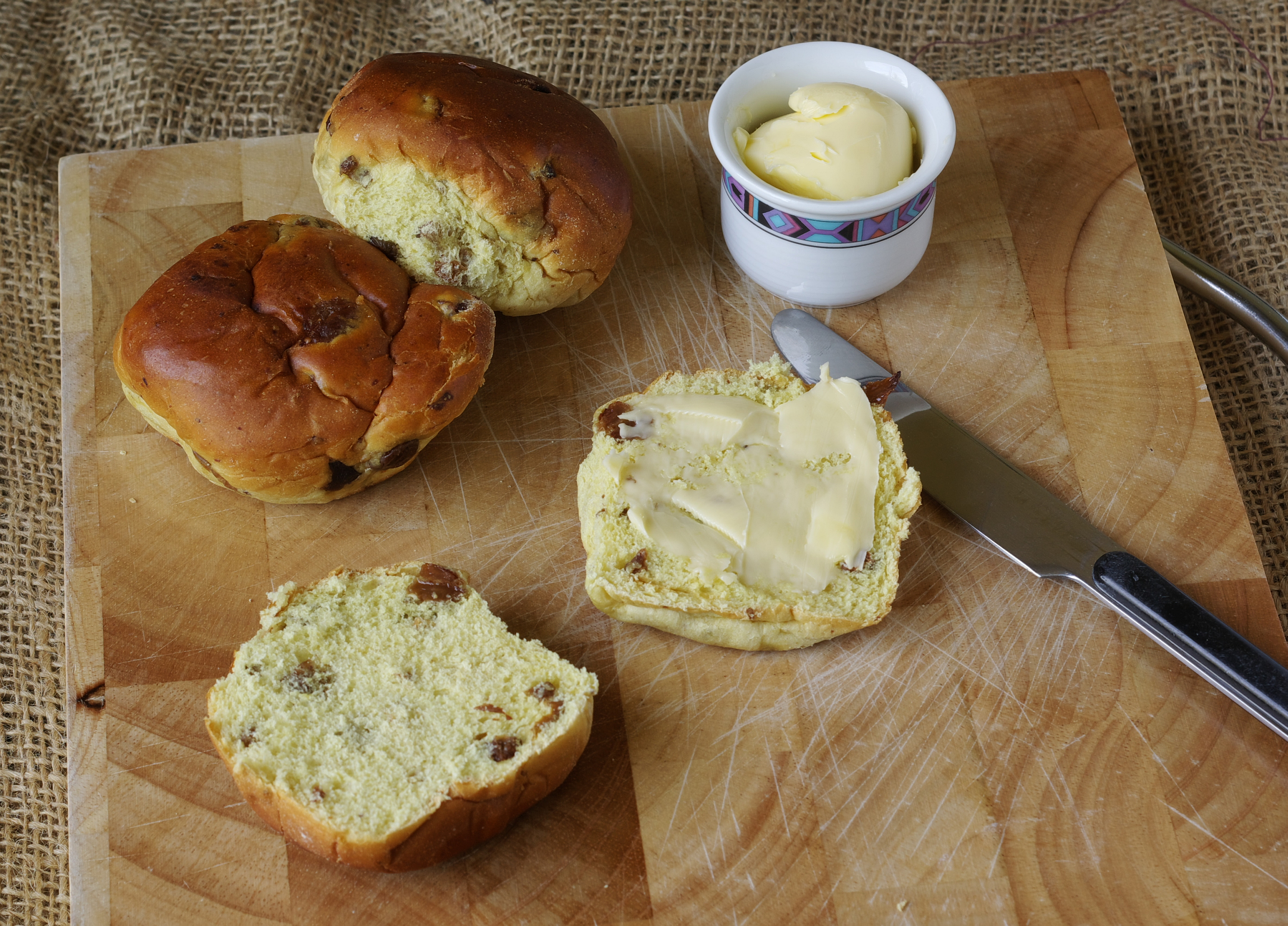
Krentenbollen are eaten with butter or cheese

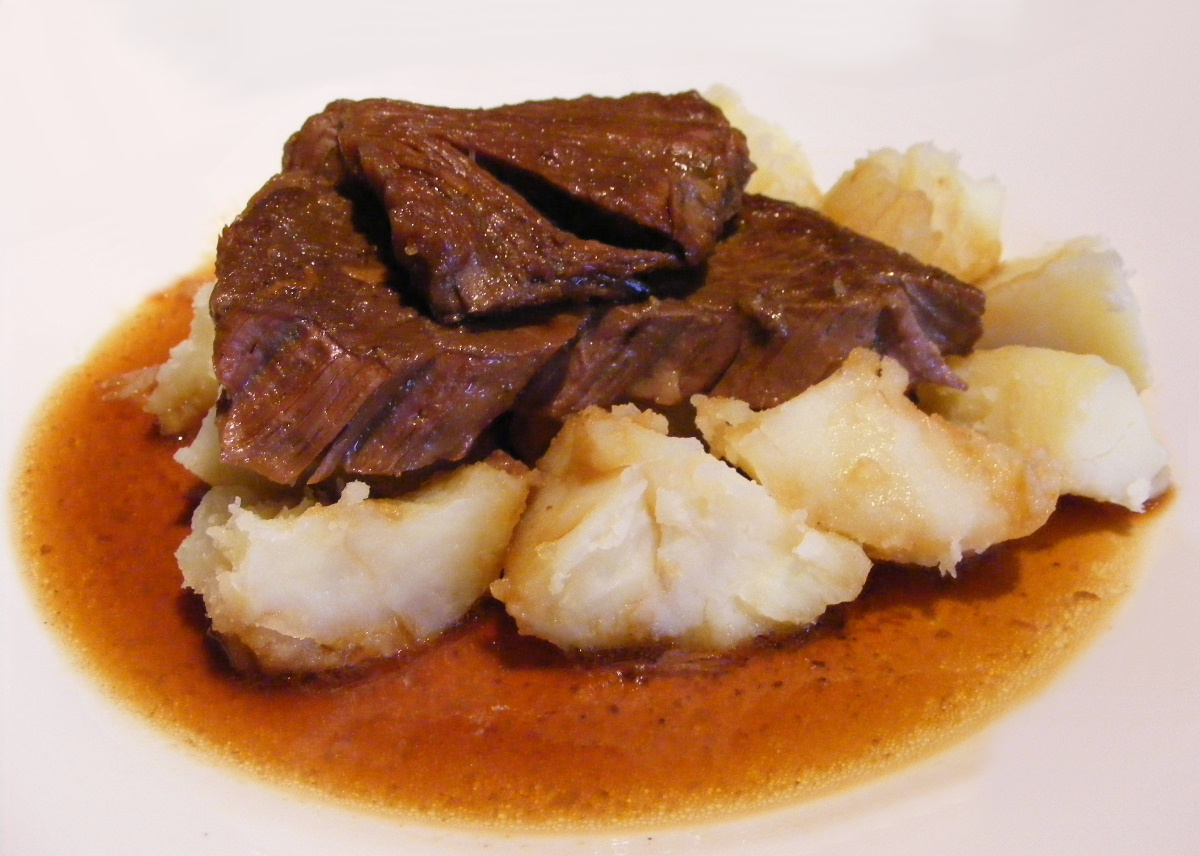
Sudderlapjes is slowly simmered beef

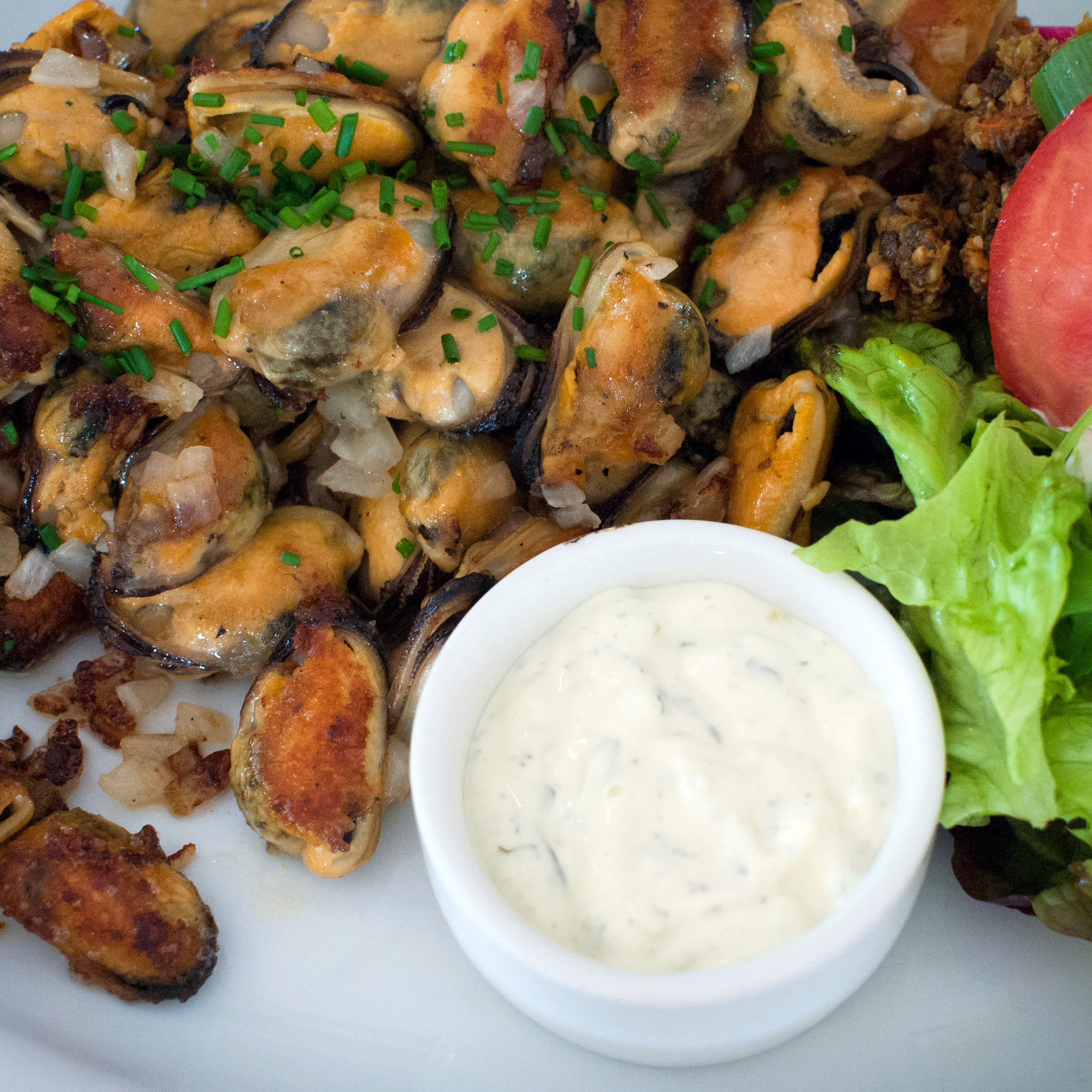
Gebakken mosselen (fried mussels)

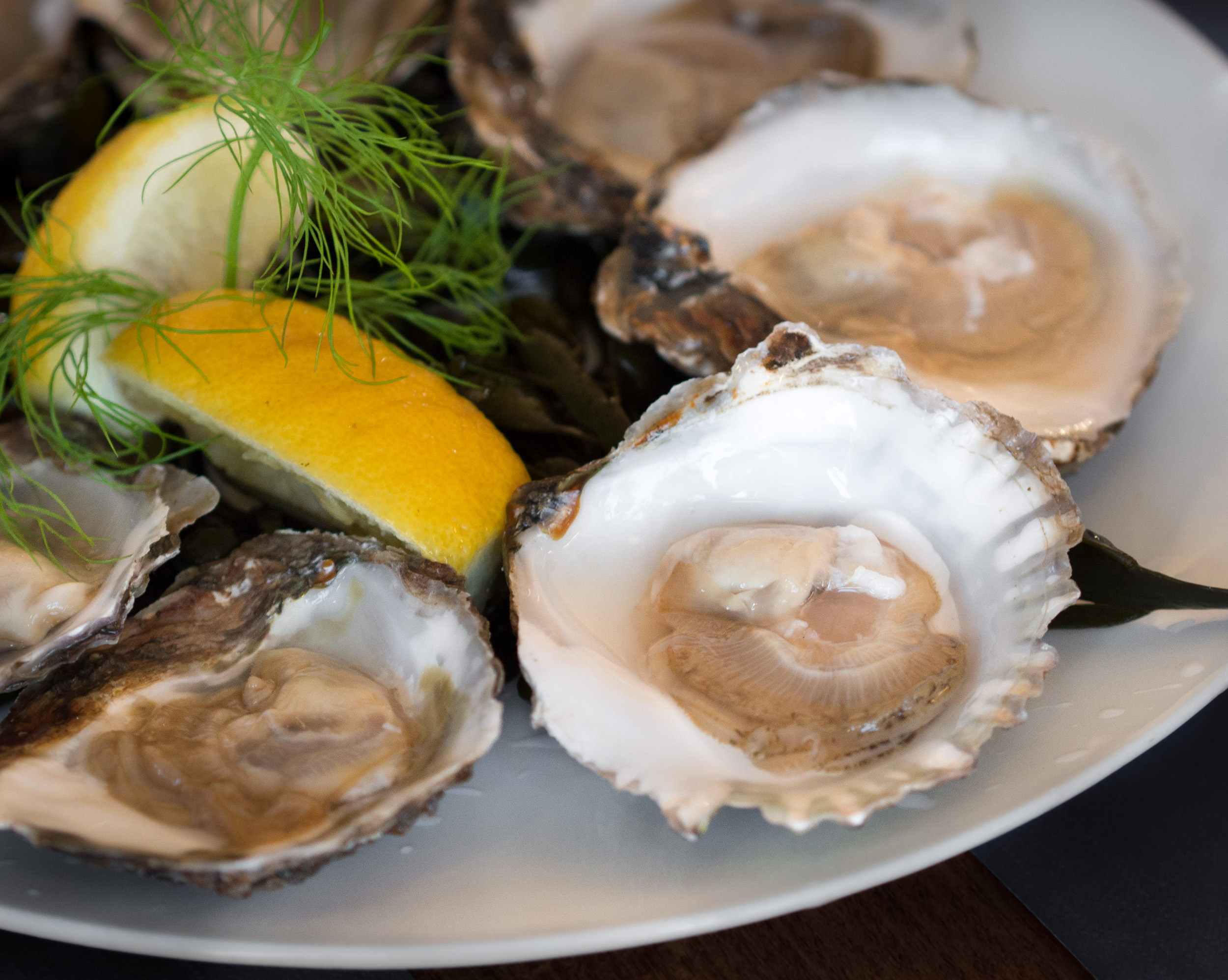
Raw oysters, which are "platte zeeuwse oester".

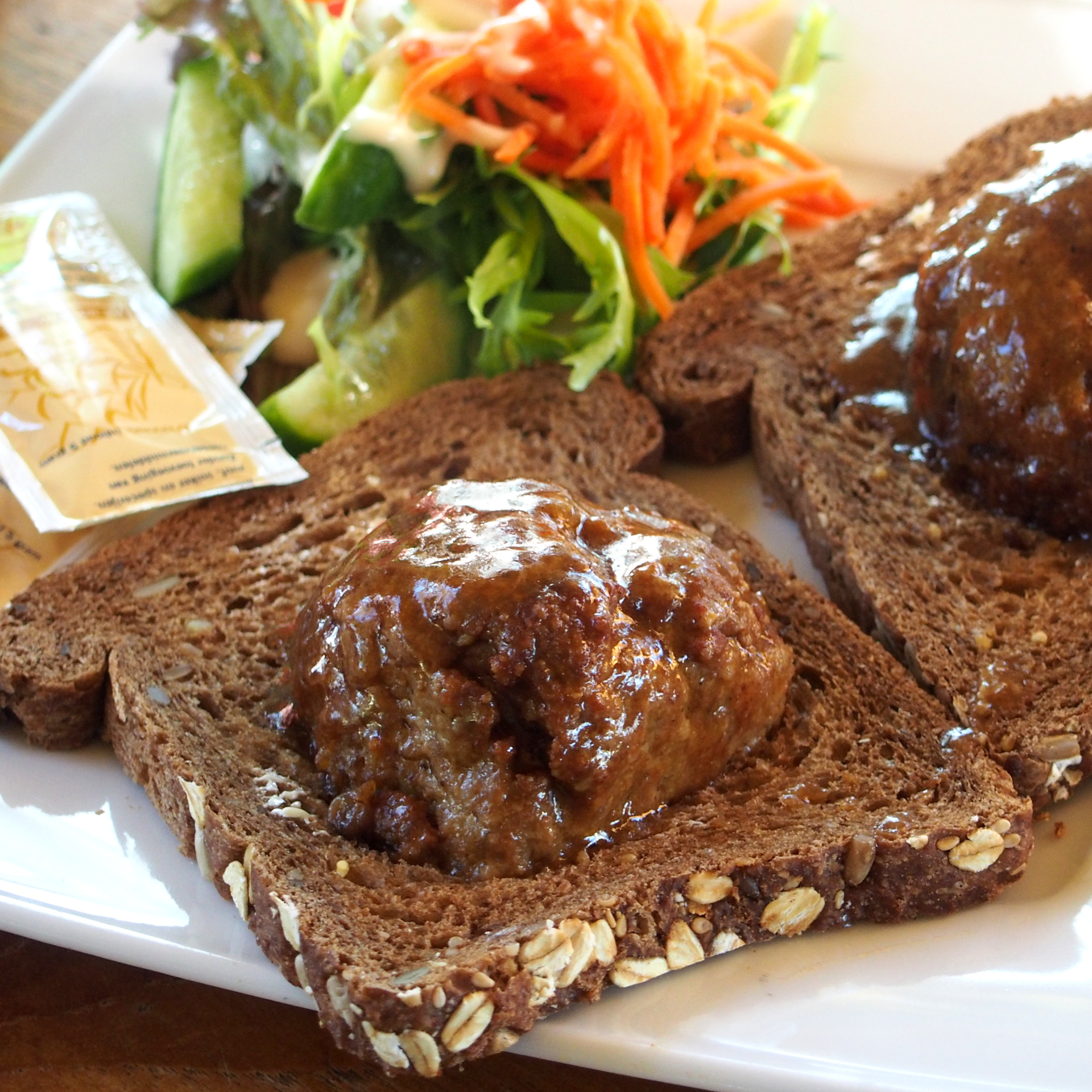
Broodje bal, a slice of bread with a meatball and gravy

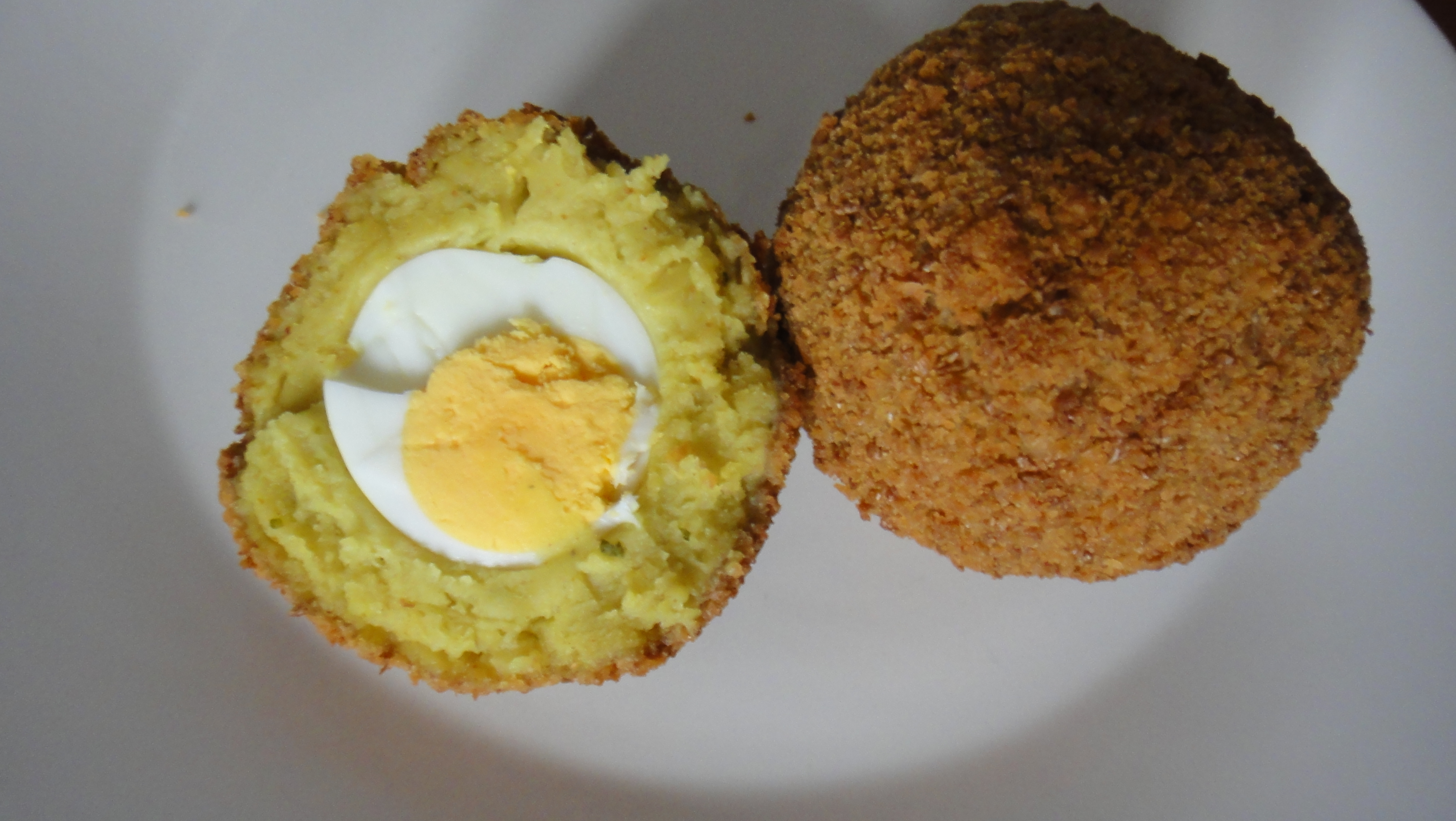
Eierbal (snack), a hard-boiled egg, coated in ragout, breaded and deep-fried.

== See also ==
- Wannée Kookboek (1910– )
- Nieuwe Haagse Kookboek (1934– )
- List of Dutch cheeses
- List of Dutch chefs
- Beer in the Netherlands
- Dutch cheese markets
- FEBO – a chain of fast-food outlets using vending machines to serve krokets, frikandellen, kaassoufflés, and other items
- Coleslaw – from the Dutch words kool (cabbage) and sla (lettuce or salad)
