= List of Dutch cheeses =

This is a list of cheeses from, or connected with, the Netherlands.

== Dutch cheeses ==
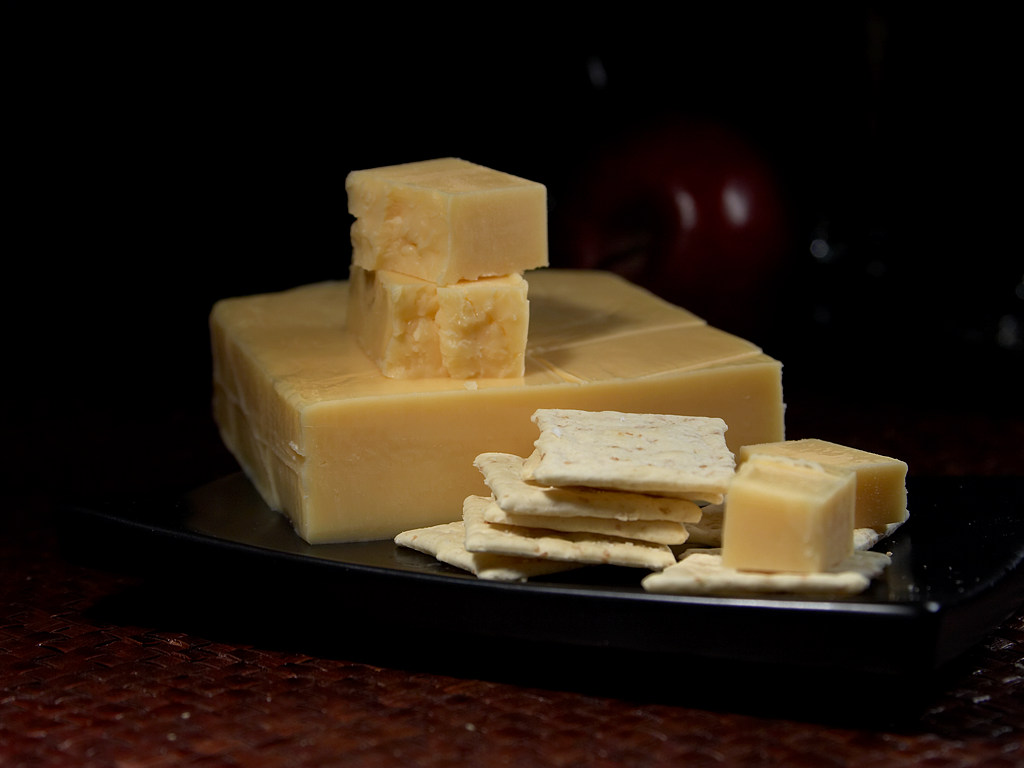
Edam cheese with crackers

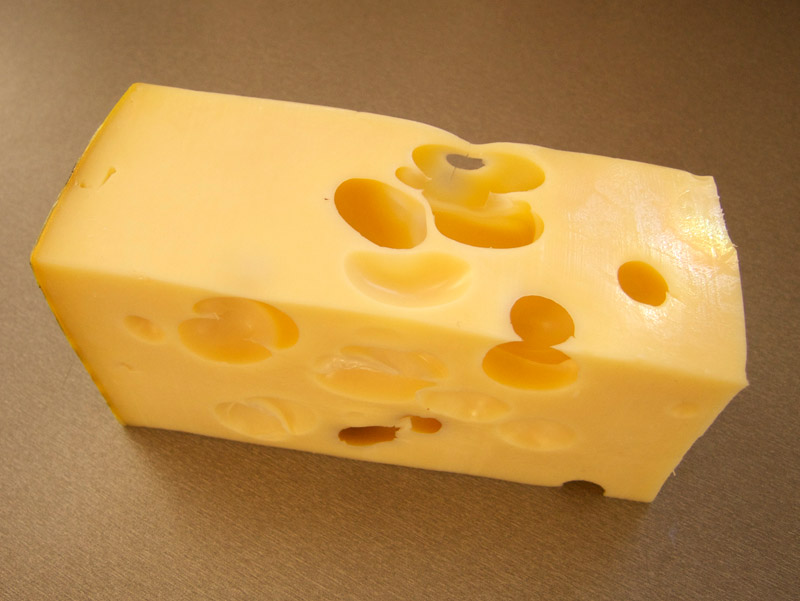
Maasdam cheese

- Beemster – a hard cow's milk cheese, traditionally from cows grazed on sea-clay soil in polders.
- Boerenkaas – "farmhouse cheese", prepared using raw unpasteurised milk.
- Edam – a red-waxed semi-hard cows' milk cheese named after the town of Edam.
- Graskaas – "grass cheese", a seasonal cows' milk cheese made from the first milkings after the cows are let into the pastures in spring.
- Gouda – a semi-hard cows' milk cheese traditionally traded in Gouda, now often used as a worldwide generic term for Dutch-style cheese.
- Kanterkaas – "edge cheese", a hard cheese produced in Friesland, with variants flavoured with cumin and cloves.
- Leerdammer – a trademarked Emmental-style semi-firm cows' milk cheese.
- Leyden – a cows' milk cheese flavoured with cumin and caraway seed.
- Limburger – a soft cheese with a distinctive smell, traditionally from the area of the former Duchy of Limburg.
- Maaslander – a trademarked Gouda-style cheese made in Huizen.
- Maasdam – an Emmental-style semi-firm cows' milk cheese.
- Nagelkaas – "clove cheese", cows' milk cheese with clove and cumin from Friesland.
- Parrano – a trademarked Gouda-style semi-firm cheese.
- Prima Donna – a similar style of cheese trademarked by a different company.
- Roomano – an aged, hard cheese with a lower butterfat percentage than other Gouda-style cheeses.
- Rotterdamsche Oude – a trademarked 36 to 100 weeks aged, hard Gouda cheese
- Vlaskaas – "flax cheese", a firm, yet creamy texture and a sweet, sharp flavor.

== See also ==
- List of cheeses
