= Swiss cheese (North America) =

Emmental or similar cheeses

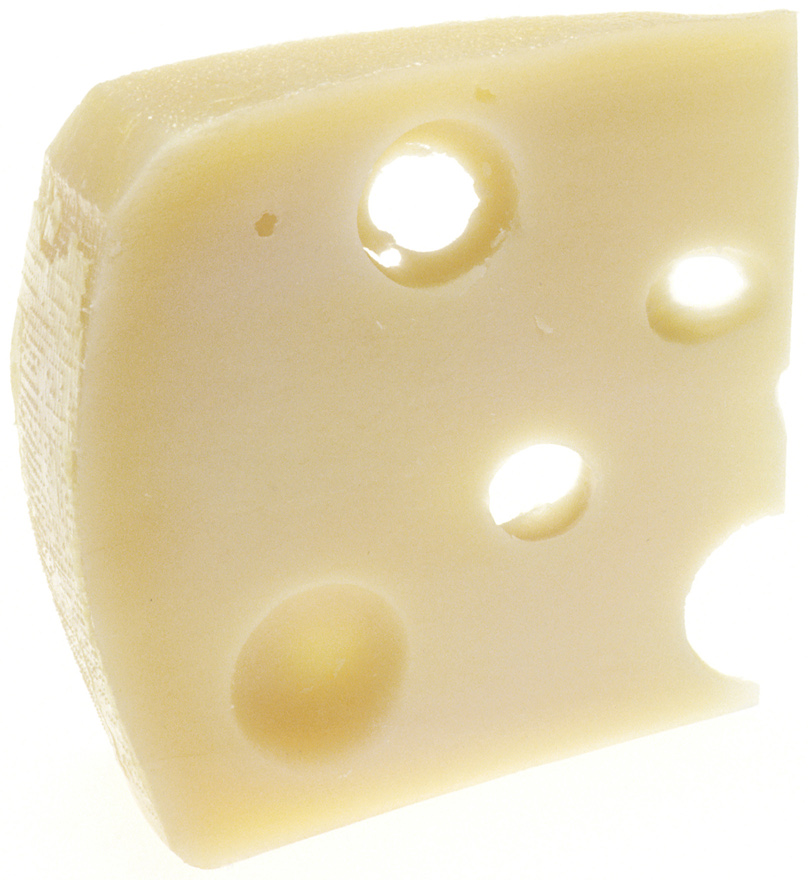
- Source of milk: Cows

The term "Swiss cheese" is used for any variety of cheese that resembles Emmental cheese, a yellow, medium-hard cheese that originated in the area around Emmental, Switzerland. It is classified as a Swiss-type or Alpine cheese. The term is generic; it does not imply that the cheese is actually made in Switzerland. Some types of Swiss cheese have a distinctive appearance, as the blocks or rounds of the cheese are riddled with holes known as "eyes". Cheese without eyes is known as "blind".

"Swiss cheese" is now produced in many countries, including the United States, Finland, Estonia, and Ireland. It is sometimes made with pasteurized or part-skim milk, unlike the original from Switzerland made with raw milk. The United States Department of Agriculture uses the terms Swiss cheese and Emmentaler cheese interchangeably. In Australia, both terms are used, along with Swiss-style cheese, in some cases differentiating the two. The term Swiss cheese is sometimes used in India, although it is also often referred to as Emmental.

== Production ==
Three types of bacteria are used in the production of Swiss cheese: Streptococcus thermophilus, Lactobacillus (L. helveticus or L. delbrueckii subsp. bulgaricus), and Propionibacterium (Propionibacterium freudenreichii subsp. shermani). In a late stage of cheese production, the propionibacteria consume the lactic acid excreted by the other bacteria and release acetate, propionic acid, and carbon dioxide gas. The carbon dioxide slowly forms the bubbles that develop the "eyes". The acetate and propionic acid give Swiss its nutty and sweet flavor. A hypothesis proposed by Swiss researchers in 2015 notes that particulate matter may also play a role in the holes' development and that modern sanitation, which eliminated debris such as hay dust in the milk, played a role in reduced hole size in Swiss cheeses, or even "blind cheese". Historically, the holes were seen as a sign of imperfection and cheese makers originally tried to avoid them by pressing during production; the holes only became an identifier of the cheese in modern times.

In general, the larger the eyes in a Swiss cheese, the more pronounced its flavor because a longer fermentation period gives the bacteria more time to act. This poses a problem, because cheese with large eyes does not slice well and comes apart in mechanical slicers. As a result, U.S. industry regulators have reduced the minimum eye size with which Swiss cheese can receive the Grade A stamp.

Typical annual production of Swiss cheese in the United States is approximately 330 million pounds (150 kt). Among U.S. states, Ohio is the largest producer of Swiss cheese.

== Variants ==
Baby Swiss and Lacy Swiss are two varieties of American Swiss cheeses. Both have small holes and a mild flavor. Baby Swiss is made from whole milk, and Lacy Swiss is made from low fat milk. Baby Swiss was developed in the mid-1960s outside of Charm, Ohio, by the Guggisberg Cheese Company, owned by Alfred Guggisberg.

== See also ==
- Maasdam cheese
- List of Swiss cheeses
