= David+Martin =

German advertising agency

- Type: GmbH
- Industry: Marketing, Advertising
- Founded: 2015
- Founders: Martin Eggert and David Stephan
- Fate: active
- Headquarters: Munich, Germany
- Key people: Martin Eggert, David Stephan
- Number of employees: > 40 (2021)
- Website: www.davidundmartin.com

David+Martin was a German creative and advertising agency. The headquarters were located in Munich.

== Company history ==
The agency was founded in 2015 by Martin Eggert and David Stephan. Their first client was the cheese manufacturer Leerdammer. In 2016, the company moved into an office close to the Viktualienmarkt in Munich.

In 2018, David+Martin worked on the regional election campaign for the German Green Party Alliance 90/The Greens. In response to the campaign, the agency first received propaganda flyers from a German right wing party; later a pig's head was placed outside the agency's office, which led to a police investigation.

In May 2021, Mark Hassan joined the agency's management. Later that year, Katrin Strathus became head of Human Resources.

Martin Eggert is a board member of Gesamtverband Kommunikationsagenturen GWA (Association of communication agencies) and was co-founder of their U30 advisory board in 2021.

== Company structure ==
In 2021, the company had more than 40 employees and a revenue of €4 million. The management of the company consists of David Stephan and Martin Eggert.

== Social engagement ==
In 2015, David+Martin created the gin brand "Refugin", with profits from the beverage going to the Munich Schlau-Schule ("smart-school") which offers classes for refugees to help them graduate school. They also created a sustainability report for the nonprofit organisation Social Bee, which illustrates the refugee route from Lesbos to Germany. In 2020, they worked on an awareness campaign for the German non-governmental organisation Sea-Watch.
