= Vlaskaas =

Type of Dutch cheese

- Country of origin: Netherlands
- Source of milk: Cows
- Pasteurised: Yes
- Texture: Semi-soft
- Aging time: Around 5 months

Vlaskaas is a Dutch Gouda cheese with a firm, yet creamy texture and a sweet, sharp flavor. Vlaskaas is made under the Beemster brand by the farmer-owned cooperative, CONO Kaasmakers in the Netherlands. The name translates to "flax cheese" but there is no flax in the cheese. The name is in honor of the historic importance of flax in the Dutch economy.
