= Parrano cheese =

Dutch cheese

Parrano
- Country of origin: Netherlands
- Region, town: n/a
- Source of milk: Cows
- Pasteurised: Yes
- Texture: Semi-firm
- Aging time: 5 months
- Certification: Trademark name
- Named after: Parrano

Parrano cheese is a cow milk cheese produced in the Netherlands. It tastes mild and nutty, combining salty and sweet flavours. It has a semi-firm texture and a smooth, golden coloured paste. Made from pasteurized milk, Parrano is produced in 20 lb (9.1 kg) wheels and is aged for 5 months.

Combining the flavour of aged parmesan with a pliant texture, Parrano is marketed as an Italian-style cheese. Taglines have included "The Dutch cheese that thinks it’s Italian" and "Sort of Italian." However, Parrano is technically Gouda cheese although its flavour is more pronounced than that of traditional Gouda.

Parrano is a versatile cheese that is easy to shred, slice and melt. It is well suited for entertaining, cooking and snacking. Its flavour complements many different types of cuisine, especially Italian dishes.

Parrano won a gold medal at the 2006 World Championship Cheese Contest in Madison, Wisconsin, for 'Best of class, Gouda.' It was also first runner up for the World Champion Cheese Title.

It is marketed chiefly under two brand names, Parrano and Prima Donna. Uniekaas Groep is the exclusive producer of Parrano, a trademarked brand. Its main competitor is Prima Donna, a trademarked brand of Vandersterre Groep.

As of October 2013 a product branded Paradiso, that has a similar taste profile to Parrano and Prima Donna is sold at Wegmans Markets. This cheese clearly has an Italian flavor profile but is also imported from the Netherlands.

== See also ==
- List of cheeses
