= Colonia cheese =

Uruguayan cheese variety

Queso Colonia
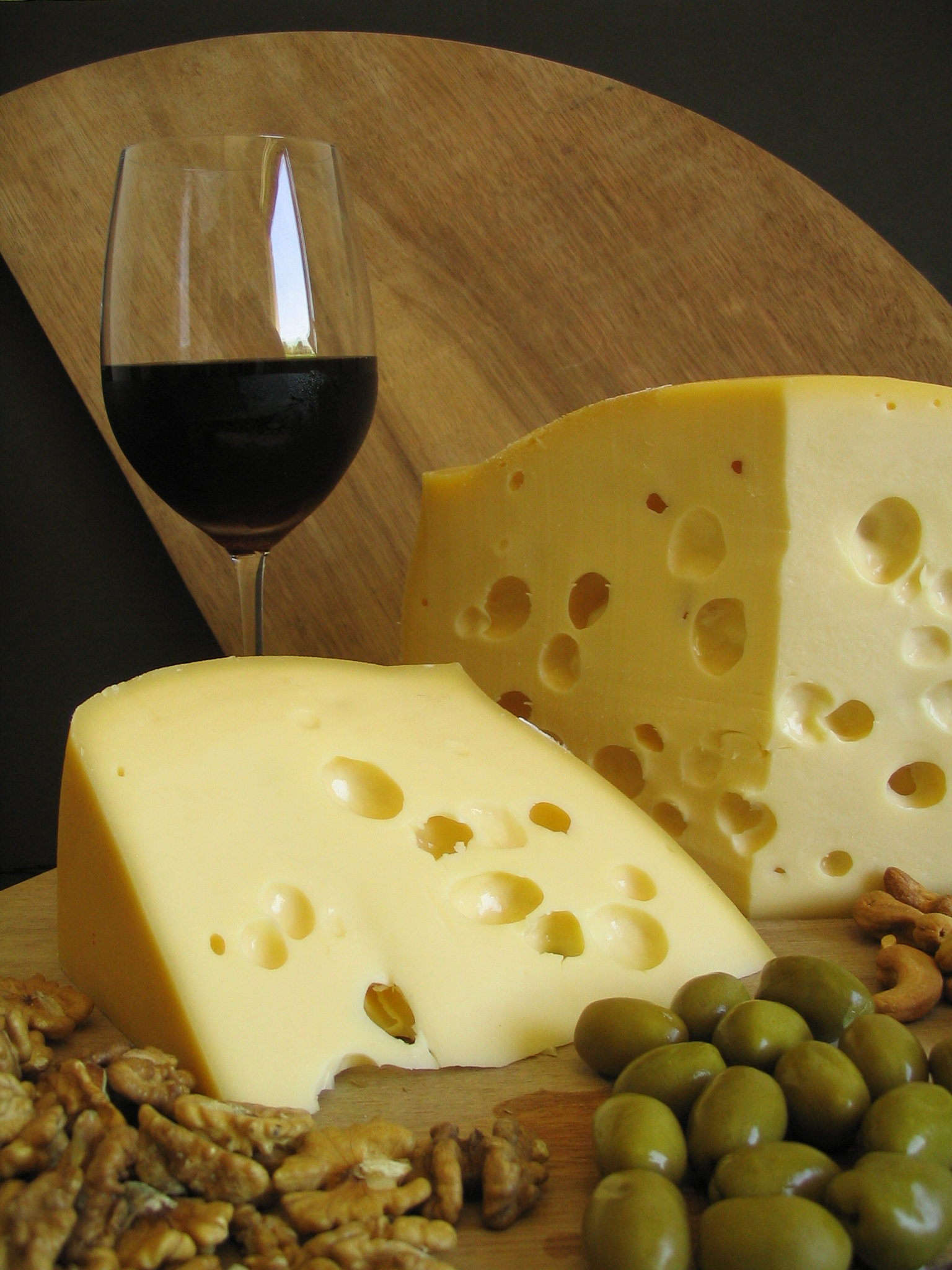
- Colonia cheese served as part of a traditional picada, accompanied by Uruguayan wine
- Country of origin: Uruguay
- Region: Colonia Department
- Town: Nueva Helvecia
- Source of milk: Cows
- Texture: Semi-hard
- Fat content: 32% to 60%
- Aging time: 4 months or more

Colonia cheese (Spanish: Queso Colonia) is a semi-hard cheese produced in Uruguay. Its name derives from its origins in the city of Nueva Helvecia, also known as Colonia Suiza (Swiss Colony), located within the country's main dairy-producing region in the southwest.

It is a semi-soft cheese with a firm rind and a pale yellow color, characterized by numerous eyes ranging from 5 to 30 mm, which develop during a maturation period of up to 12 months. Although it originated from Emmental cheese, it has a milder flavor and a softer consistency.

== History ==
Colonia cheese originated in 1868 in the city of Nueva Helvecia, founded in the early 1860s in the Colonia Department by Swiss immigrants. A Swiss settler from the canton of Bern, Juan Teófilo Karlen initiated its production as a family enterprise in a region that subsequently developed into the country's main dairy-producing area, largely due to the significant settlement of Central European immigrants in the second half of the 19th century.

It originated as an attempt to reproduce Emmental cheese. However, due to factors such as climate, technology, geography, market conditions, and milk availability, it ultimately developed into a distinct Uruguayan cheese variety with its own flavor and consistency.
