= Erythritol kinase =

Identifiers
- EC no.: 2.7.1.27
- CAS no.: 9030-64-2

Databases
- IntEnz: IntEnz view
- BRENDA: BRENDA entry
- ExPASy: NiceZyme view
- KEGG: KEGG entry
- MetaCyc: metabolic pathway
- PRIAM: profile
- PDB structures: RCSB PDB PDBe PDBsum
- Gene Ontology: AmiGO / QuickGO
Search
- PMC: articles
- PubMed: articles
- NCBI: proteins

Erythritol kinase (EC 2.7.1.27) is an enzyme that catalyzes the chemical reaction

ATP +
erythritol
ADP +
D-erythritol 4-phosphate

The enzyme characterised from Propionibacterium pentosaceum converts the sugar alcohol, erythritol, to D-erythritol 4-phosphate, by transferring a phosphate group from the cofactor, adenosine triphosphate (ATP), which is converted to adenosine diphosphate (ADP).

This enzyme is a transferase, specifically one transferring phosphorus-containing groups (phosphotransferases) with an alcohol group as acceptor. The systematic name of this enzyme class is ATP:erythritol 4-phosphotransferase. This enzyme is also called erythritol kinase (phosphorylating).

== Structural studies ==
As of late 2007, only one structure has been solved for this class of enzymes, with the PDB accession code PDB: 1V5S.
