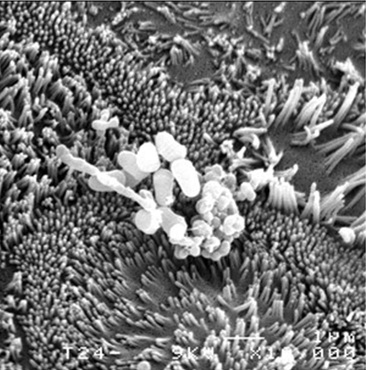
- Propionibacterium freudenreichii CIRM-BIA 129 adhesion to cultured colon epithelial cells

Scientific classification
- Domain: Bacteria
- Kingdom: Bacillati
- Phylum: Actinomycetota
- Class: Actinomycetes
- Order: Propionibacteriales
- Family: Propionibacteriaceae
- Genus: Propionibacterium
- Species: P. freudenreichii

Binomial name
- Propionibacterium freudenreichii van Niel 1928 (Approved Lists 1980)

Type strain
- ATCC 6207; CCUG 7433; CIP 103026; DSM 20271; HAMBI 274; IFO 12424; LMG 16412; NBRC 12424; NCTC 10470; NRRL B-3523

Synonyms
- Propionibacterium freudenreichii subsp. shermanii (van Niel 1928) Holdeman and Moore 1970 (Approved Lists 1980); "Propionibacterium shermanii" van Niel 1928

= Propionibacterium freudenreichii =

Species of bacterium

Propionibacterium freudenreichii is a gram-positive, non-motile bacterium that plays an important role in the creation of Emmental cheese, and to some extent, Jarlsberg cheese, Leerdammer and Maasdam cheese. Its concentration in Swiss-type cheeses is higher than in any other cheese. Propionibacteria are commonly found in milk and dairy products, though they have also been extracted from soil. P. freudenreichii has a circular chromosome about 2.5 Mb long. When Emmental cheese is being produced, P. freudenreichii ferments lactate to form acetate, propionate, and carbon dioxide: (3 C_{3}H_{6}O_{3} → 2 C_{2}H_{5}CO_{2} + C_{2}H_{3}O_{2} + CO_{2}).

The products of this fermentation contribute to the nutty and sweet flavors of the cheese, and the carbon dioxide byproduct is responsible for forming the holes, or "eyes" in the cheese. Cheesemakers control the size of the holes by changing the acidity, temperature, and curing time of the mixture. An estimated one billion living cells of P. freudenreichii are present in one gram of Emmental. In contrast to most lactic acid bacteria, this bacterium mainly breaks down lipids, forming free fatty acids. Recent research has focused on possible benefits incurred from consuming P. freudenreichii, which are thought to cleanse the gastrointestinal tract. P. freudenreichii has also been suggested to possibly lower the incidence of colon cancer. This mutualistic relationship is unusual in propionibacteria, which are largely commensal.

The performance and growth of P. freudenreichii is highly dependent on the presence of Lactobacillus helveticus, which provides essential amino acids. The degradation of L. helvecticus releases a variety of amino acids and peptides. While P. freudenreichii has been found to grow even in the absence of L. helvecticus, some strains of the bacteria were observed lysing in the absence of glutamine, lysine, or tyrosine. The autolysis of P. freudenreichii has been suggested to contribute further to the flavor of the Emmental cheese. The conditions leading to the autolysis of this bacterium are not well known.

== History ==
Propionibacterium freudenreichii was first discovered and isolated in the early 20th century by Eduard von Freudenreich and Sigurd Orla-Jensen. They discovered the bacterium while studying propionic acid fermentation in Emmental cheese. Its genus is named after propionic acid, which this bacterium produces. The species freudenreichii is named after von Freudenreich.

== Features of the bacterium ==
The cells themselves most commonly take the shape of pleomorphic (able to assume different forms) rods (0.2–1.5 micrometers *, 1–5 micrometers) but they can also be coccoid, bifid, branched, or filamentous. The length of the cell can be as long as 20 micrometers. When grown on solid media the colonies formed can appear smooth, convex, or rough. When grown in liquid media the colonies may be observed, appearing granular and varying in size. The colonies can vary quite a bit in color: they have been observed as being red, pink, orange, yellow, gray, and white. P. freudenreichii is gram-positive and non-motile. One discernible feature of this bacterium is that it produces large quantities of propionic and acetic acids. It can ferment sugars and polyhydroxy alcohols, and lactate provided that there are bacteria nearby are producing it by their own fermentative activities (this is known as secondary fermentation). It can also produce iso-valeric, formic, succinic, or lactic acids as well as carbon dioxide (although these are all secreted in lesser amounts than the other substances it produces). Certain strains of the bacterial cells have surface proteins: these act as a starter for cheese ripening. Depending on the strain there are varying cellular appendages that can be present, pili have been found on certain strains.

The value of P. freudenreichii's DNA coding is 2,321,778 bp (87.64% of the genome). The genome itself is circular in shape. Its genome has one finalized chromosome with no plasmids. The genome is 2,649,166 nucleotides in size. The G/C content of the genome is 67.34%.

== Cheesemaking ==
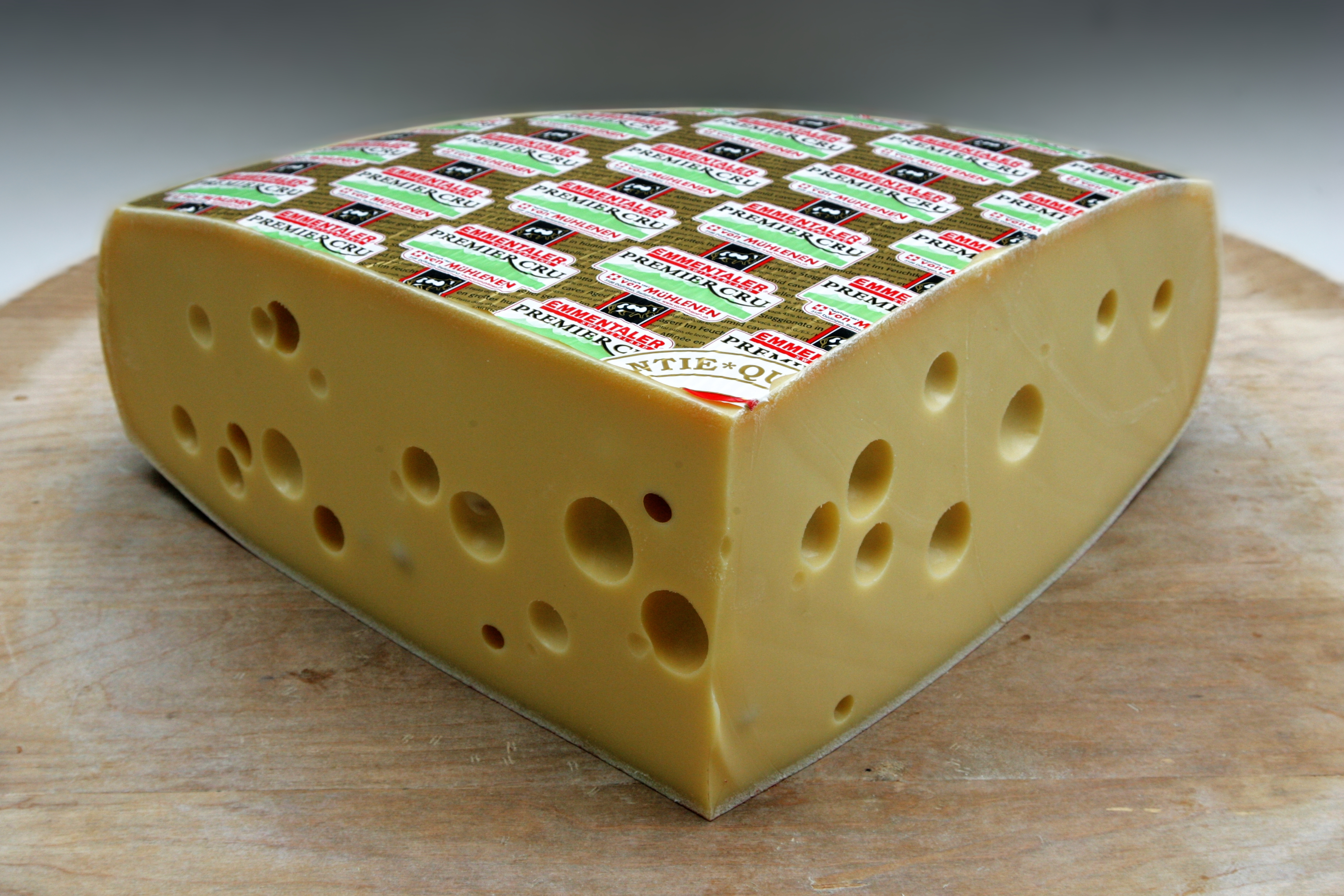
Emmentaler, a type of Swiss cheese, requires Propionibacterium freudenreichii.

Propionibacterium freudenreichii is perhaps best known for its usages in the production of cheeses, most notably Swiss cheese.

== Probiotic uses ==
One area of intrigue surrounding this bacterium has been its potential usage as a probiotic. P. freudenreichii produces a bifidogenetic compound that aids in stimulating bifidobacterial growth. On the molecular level, recent studies have indicated that the surface proteins of P. freudenreichii adhere to human intestinal cells. This binding of surface proteins is what allows for certain functions to then take place, such as modulating the release of cytokines by human intestinal cells.
