= Maasdam (disambiguation) =

Maasdam is a village and former administrative land division in the Netherlands.

Maasdam may also refer to:

- Maasdam cheese

== Ships ==
- SS Maasdam (1889), a Dutch ocean liner
- SS Maasdam (1921), a cargo liner sunk in 1941
- SS Maasdam (1952), another Dutch ocean liner
- MS Maasdam, a cruise ship
