= Maaslander =

Brand name for a Gouda, semihard cheese

- Country of origin: Netherlands
- Region: Huizen
- Source of milk: Cows
- Pasteurised: Yes
- Texture: Semi-hard
- Fat content: 30-48%
- Aging time: Up to 10 months
- Certification: No

Maaslander is a brand name for a Gouda, semihard cheese from the family Westland a.k.a. Westland Cheese Specialties BV, located at Huizen, the Netherlands. Maaslander is one of the first Dutch cheese brands, and it is a protected designation of origin. Including the green and yellow stripes, and also the name lander.

Regular Dutch Gouda cheese contains salt from the use of brine in the production, which can lead to a high bloodpressure. So, the company began producing the Maaslander at a factory in Arkel in 1978. This cheese, slightly shallower, with a shorter time of immersion, resulted in a lower salinity and a mild-flavored cheese. Due to the shorter curing, the cheese contains more milk fluid.

Cheese factories outside the Netherlands also produce Maaslander cheese, for example in Flensburg, Germany.

Westland specializes in the sale of branded cheese. Old Amsterdam is also a brand of the company. In the UK Old Amsterdam is marketed by Bradbury's of Buxton, a company founded, in 1884, as Bradbury and Son, by Reverend William John Bradbury.

== Maaslander types ==
- 30+ matured
- 48+ slightly matured (green / yellow stripes)
- 48+ matured (red / yellow stripes)

== See also ==
- Dutch cheese markets – Traditional market
- Edam cheese – Semi-hard Dutch cheese
- Gouda cheese – Dutch yellow cheese made from cow's milk
- List of cheeses
