= Propionate CoA-transferase =

Class of enzymes

Identifiers
- EC no.: 2.8.3.1
- CAS no.: 9026-15-7

Databases
- BRENDA: enzyme data
- ExPASy: NiceZyme view
- KEGG: enzyme entry
- MetaCyc: metabolic pathway
- Rhea: reactions
- PDB structures: RCSB PDB PDBe PDBsum
- Gene Ontology: AmiGO / QuickGO
Search
- PMC: articles
- PubMed: articles
- NCBI: proteins

Propionate CoA-transferase (EC 2.8.3.1) is an enzyme that catalyzes the chemical reaction

propionic acid
+
acetyl-CoA
acetic acid
+
propionyl-CoA

The two substrates of this enzyme characterised from Propionibacterium shermanii, Clostridium propionicum and Ralstonia eutropha are propionic acid and acetyl-CoA. Its products are acetic acid and propanoyl-CoA.

== Nomenclature ==
This enzyme is a transferase, specifically a CoA-transferase. Its systematic name and other names in common use are listed below:

- acetyl-CoA:propanoate CoA-transferase (systematic name)
- propionate coenzyme A-transferase
- propionate-CoA:lactoyl-CoA transferase
- propionyl CoA:acetate CoA transferase
- propionyl-CoA transferase
