= Friesian Clove =

Frisian cheese

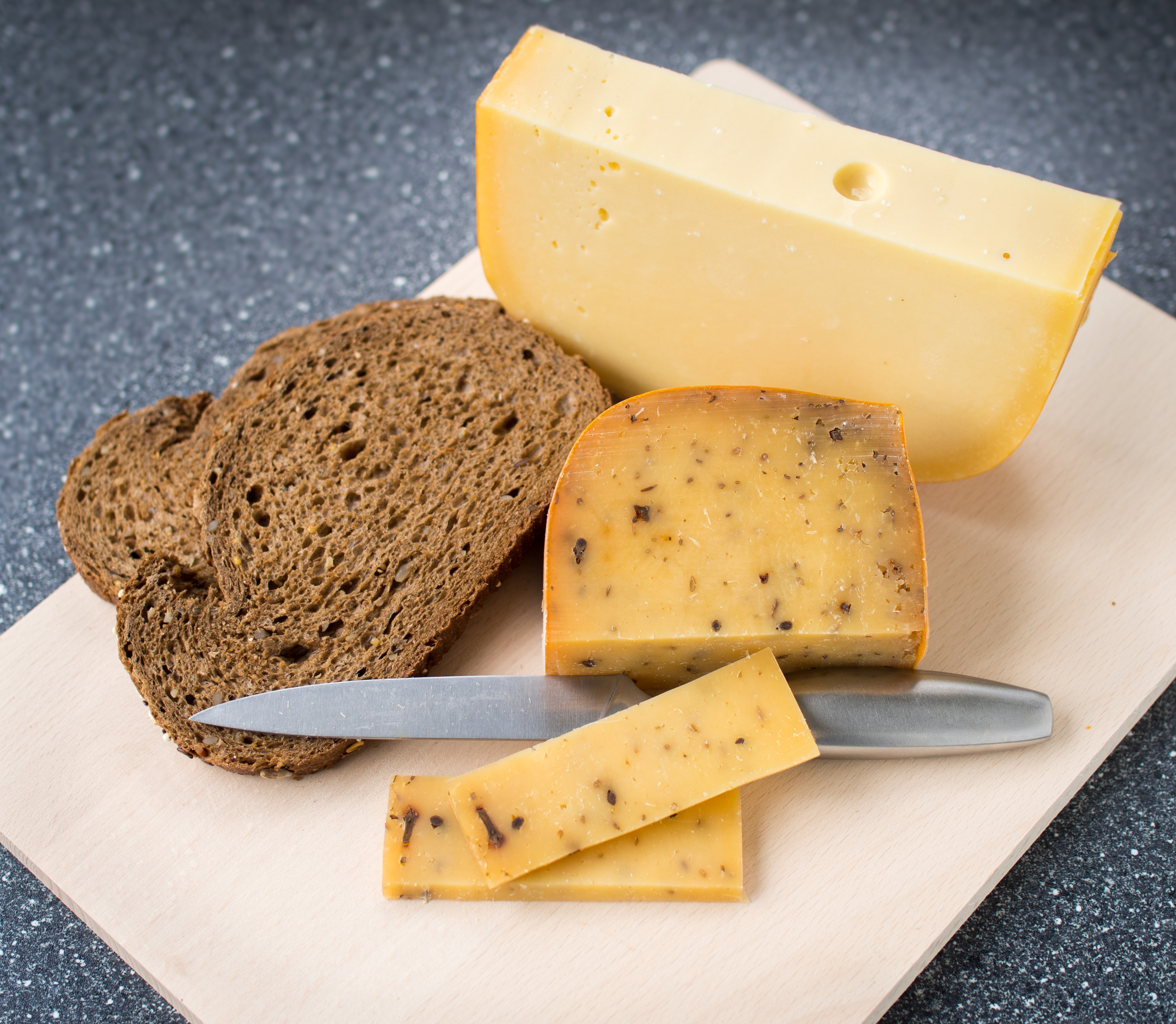

Nagelkaas, also called Frisian Clove cheese, is an unprotected name variant of kanterkaas, a Dutch cheese developed in the Friesland region of the Netherlands. It is a firm-textured gouda-style cheese made from skim pasteurized cow's milk. Its 23% butterfat content results in a mild flavor, which is augmented with the addition of cloves and cumin for a pronounced spicy taste.

Its name comes from the Dutch word for clove, kruidnagel (literally 'spice nail', from the cloves's nail-like shape). It is locally known as "nail cheese" or, in Dutch, Nagelkaas.
