= Grevé =

Swedish cheese

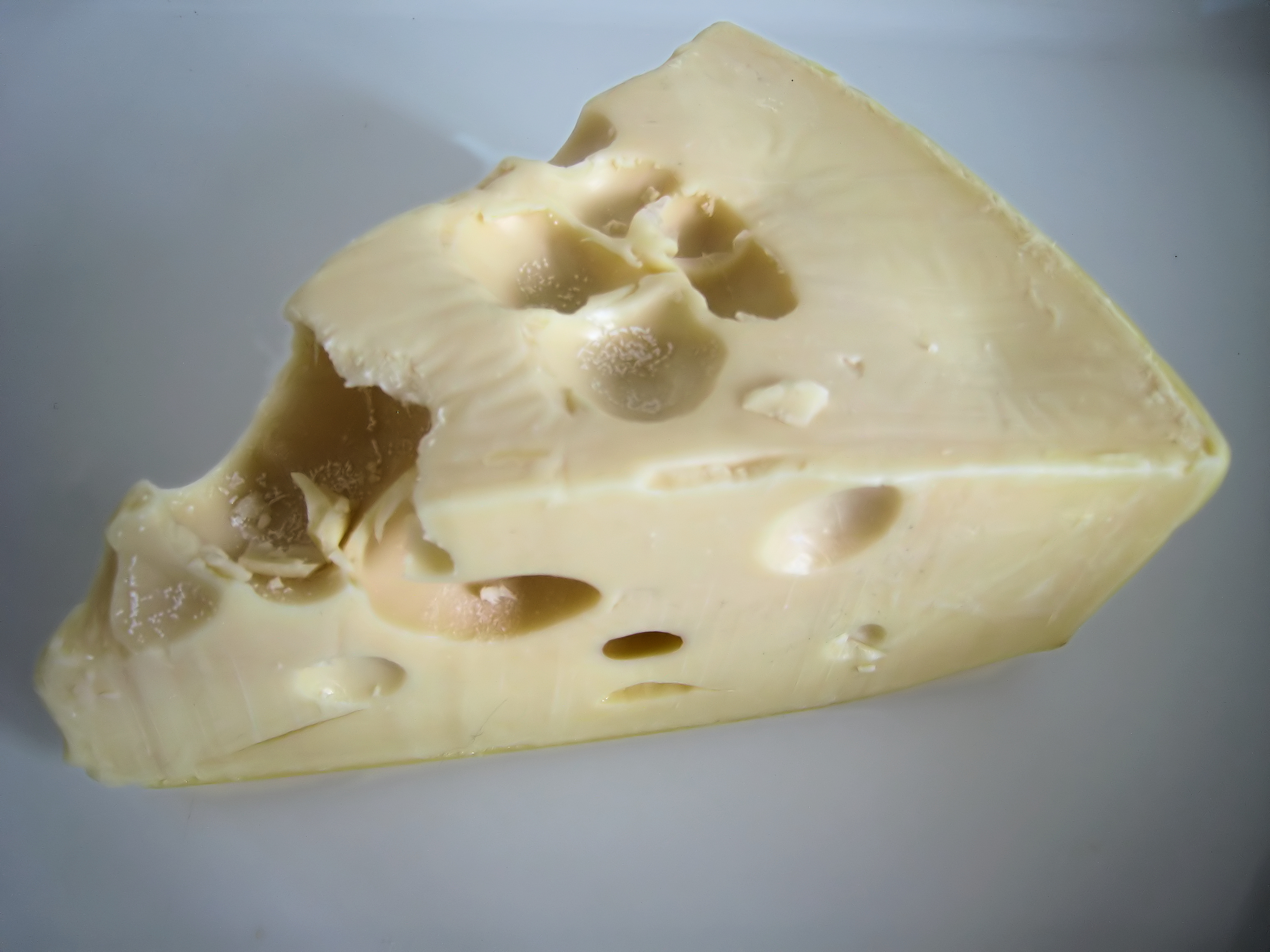
- Country of origin: Sweden
- Town: Örnsköldsvik
- Source of milk: Cows
- Pasteurised: Yes
- Texture: Semi-hard

Grevé (/ɡrəˈveɪ/ grə-VAY) is a Swedish cow's milk cheese which is similar to Emmental cheese. The semi-hard cheese has a nut-like, slightly sweet taste and a fat content of 30%–45%. It was first produced in 1964 at Örnsköldsvik in Västernorrland County, Sweden.

Grevé is a registered trademark that has been owned since 2004 by the company Svenska Ostklassiker AB, a subsidiary of Svensk Mjölk.

== Etymology ==
The name Grevé does not mean anything; however, it sounds similar to the word greve, meaning 'count' in North Germanic languages and is equivalent to the title graf in the German-speaking world. The cheese was created under the working name "Alpost" (Alp-cheese) and the producers wanted a name that would sound similar to Swiss cheese names, e.g. Gruyère.
