= Propionibacterium acidifaciens =

Scientific classification
- Domain: Bacteria
- Kingdom: Bacillati
- Phylum: Actinomycetota
- Class: Actinomycetia
- Order: Propionibacteriales
- Family: Propionibacteriaceae
- Genus: Propionibacterium
- Species: P. acidifaciens

Binomial name
- Propionibacterium acidifaciens Downes and Wade 2009

Type strain
- C3M_31, CCUG 57100, DSM 21887, JCM 16571

Species of bacterium

Propionibacterium acidifaciens is a Gram-positive, anaerobic and pleomorphic bacterium from the genus of Propionibacterium which has been isolated from a human oral cavity in London in England.
