= Roomano =

Type of cheese from the Netherlands

Roomano (Dutch: [roːˈmaːnoː]) is an aged hard Gouda-style cheese from Friesland in the northern Netherlands.

While butterfat requirements for Gouda are 48% butterfat or more, Roomano contains less than 48% butterfat. It is made from cow's milk, and is typically aged for four or more years. The cheese's flavor is very complex, salty and sweet with hints of roasted hazelnut and toffee.

The cheese pairs well with strong flavors such as aged sherries, ports or Belgian ales.

== See also ==
- List of cheeses
