= Schoonrewoerd =

- Village
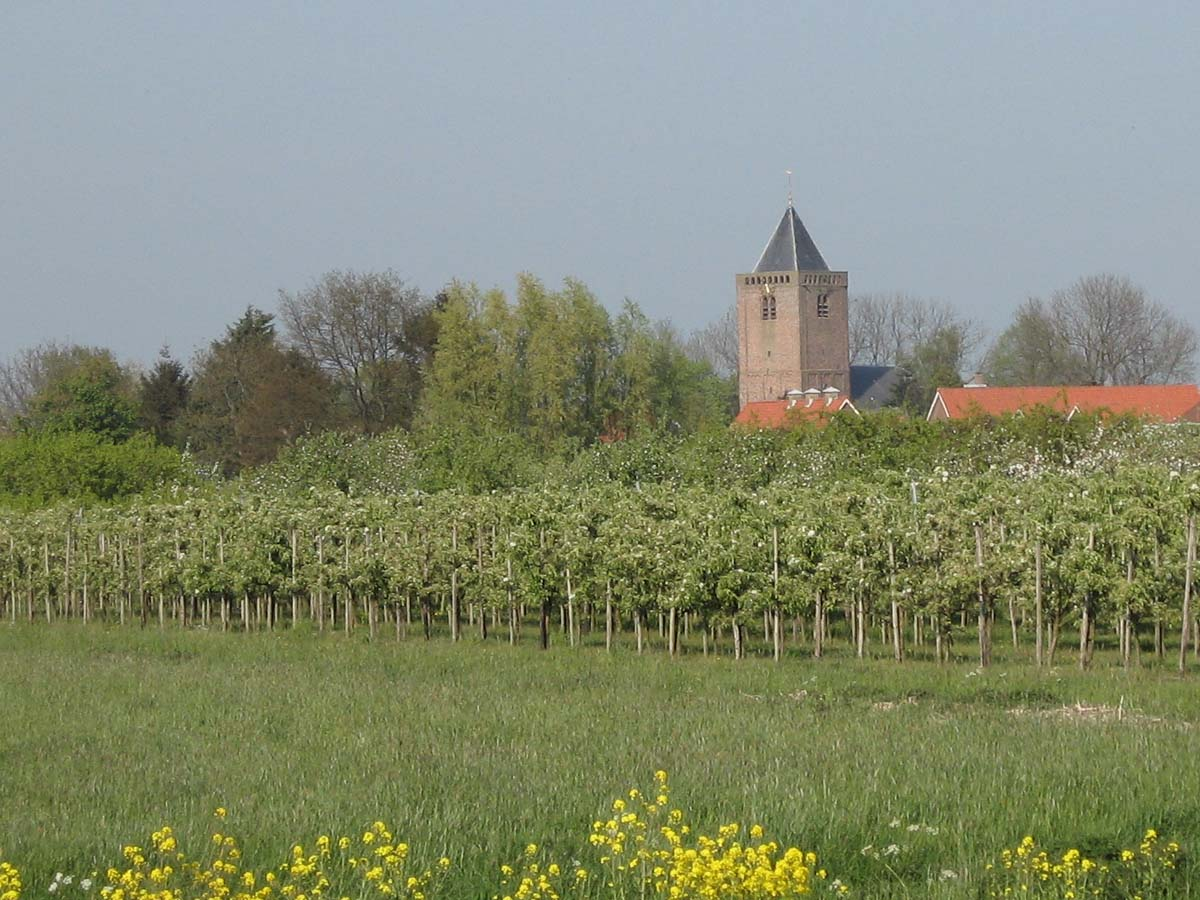
- Protestant Church Nieuwland

- Flag Coat of arms

- Location in the Netherlands Schoonrewoerd (Netherlands)
- Coordinates: 51.92045°N 5.11595°E
- Country: Netherlands
- Province: Utrecht
- Municipality: Vijfheerenlanden

Area
  - Total: 7.81 km^{2} (3.02 sq mi)
- Elevation: 3 m (9.8 ft)

Population (2021)
  - Total: 1,655
  - Density: 212/km^{2} (549/sq mi)
- Time zone: UTC+1 (CET)
  - Summer (DST): UTC+2 (CEST)
- Postal code: 4145
- Dialing code: 0345

Schoonrewoerd is a village in the center of the Netherlands. It is a located in the municipality of Vijfheerenlanden, Utrecht, about 25 km south of the city of Utrecht. Leerdammer cheese is produced in Schoonrewoerd.

The village was first mentioned in the 14th century as Scoenrewrth, and means "beautiful terp (artificial living hill)". Schoonrewoerd developed around the church on a sandy ridge crossed by the Leerdam-Everdingen. The village centre has been raised by about three metres. The church tower dates from the 14th century. The church itself was damaged by war in 1672 and a storm in 1674, and contains few older elements. In 1840, Schoonrewoerd was home to 239 people. The cheese factory is the biggest employer. It was a municipality in South Holland until 1986, when it merged into Leerdam.

== Gallery ==
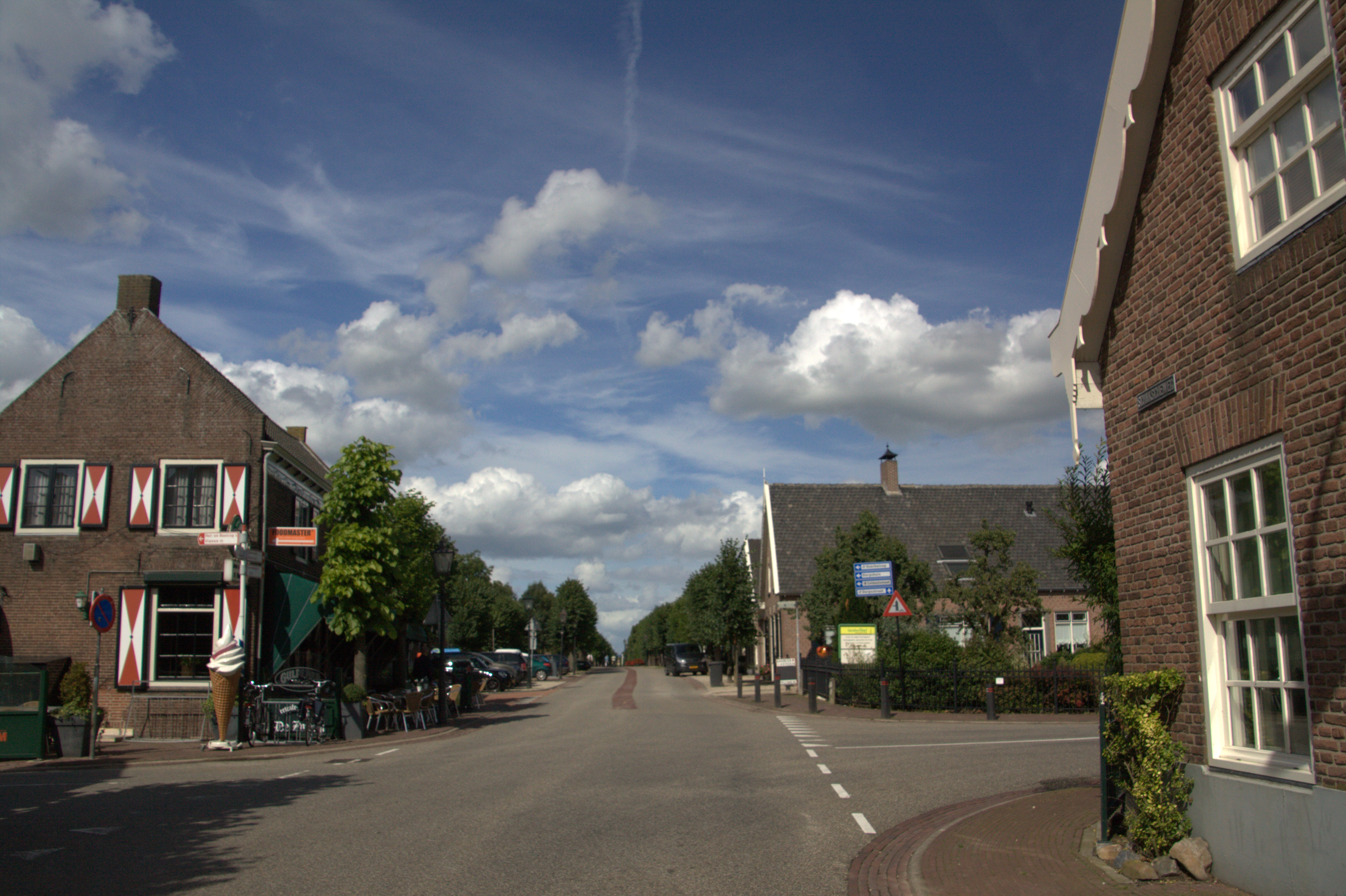
Street view

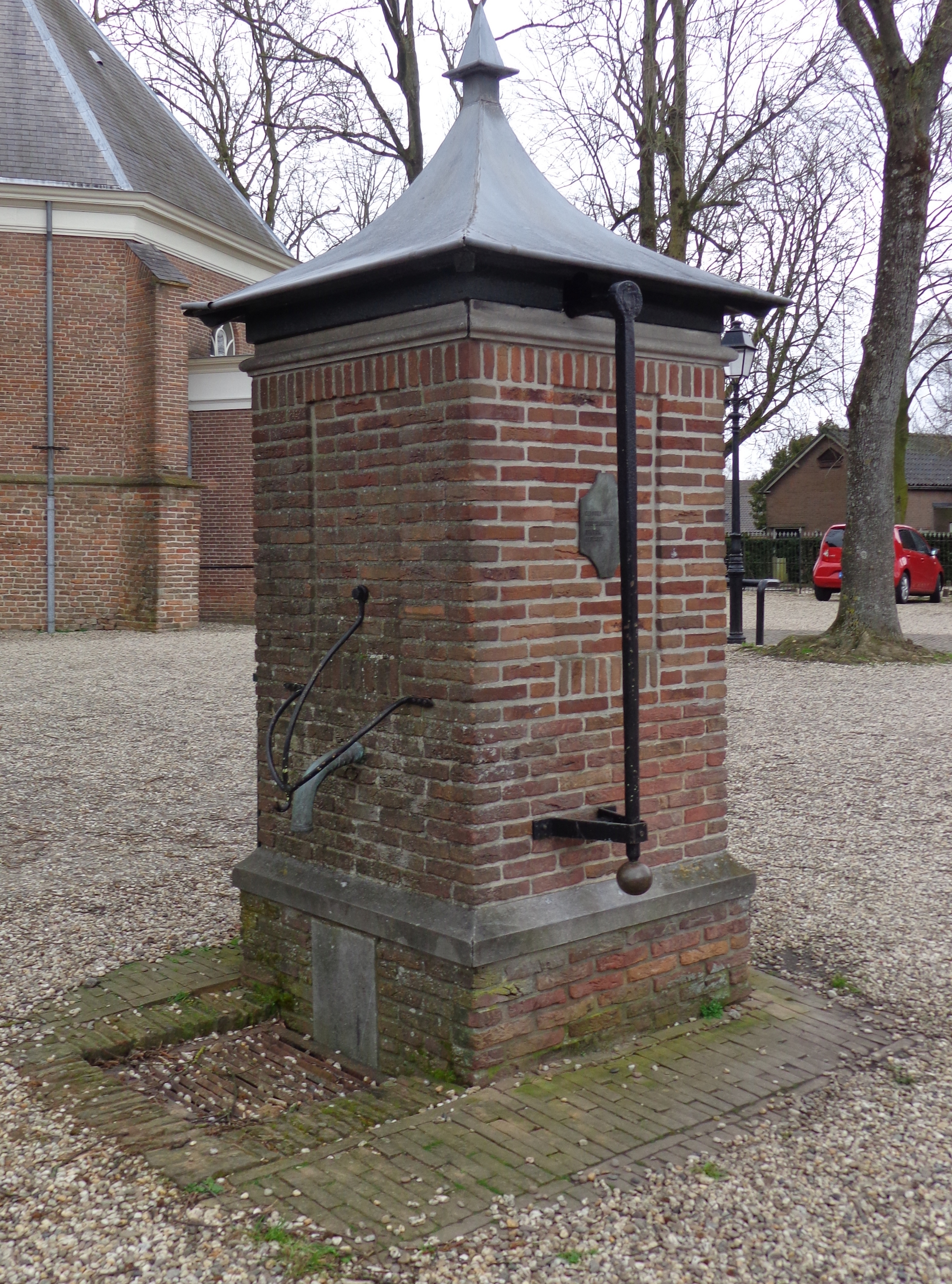
Village pump

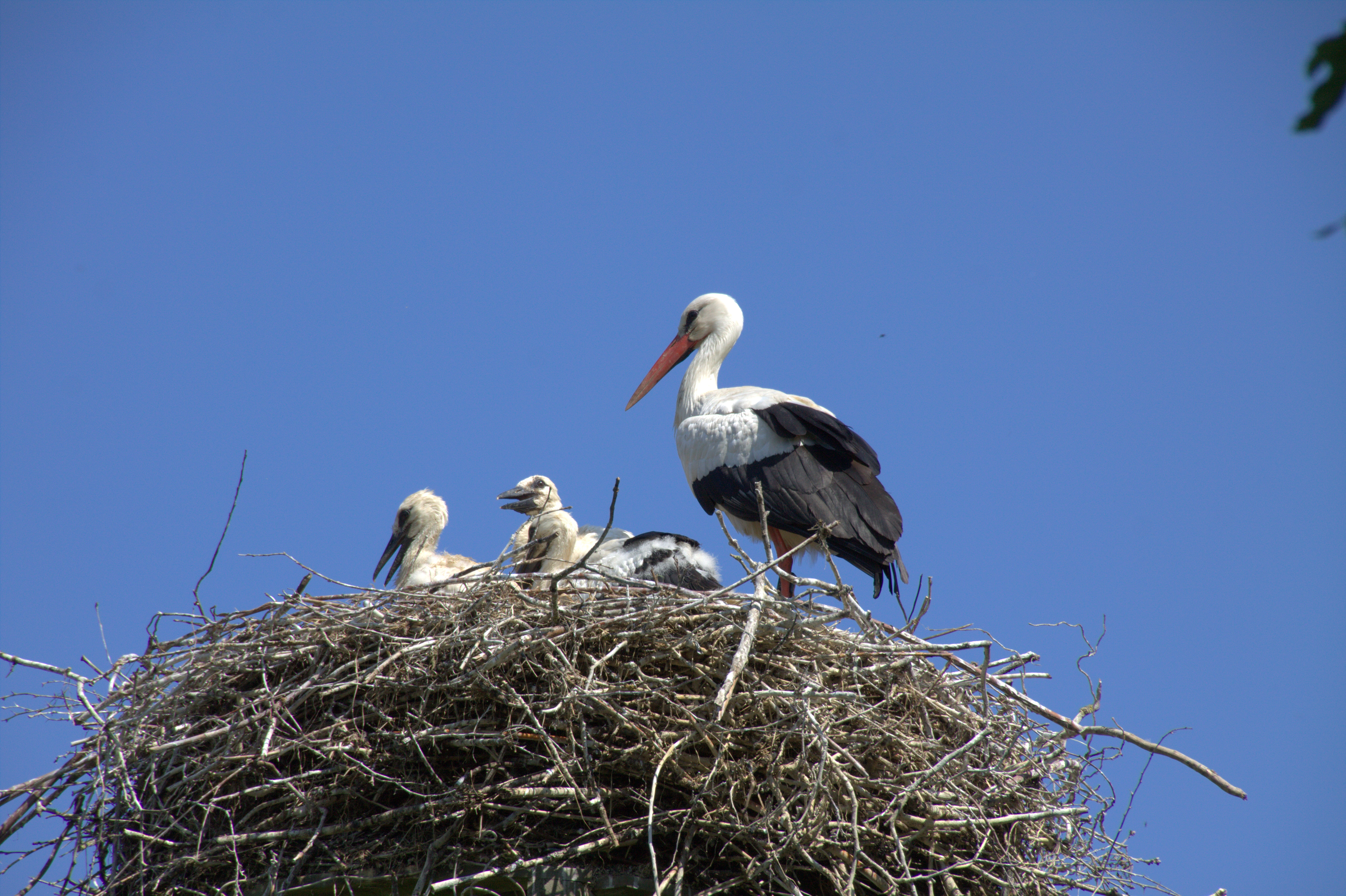
Storks on the nest

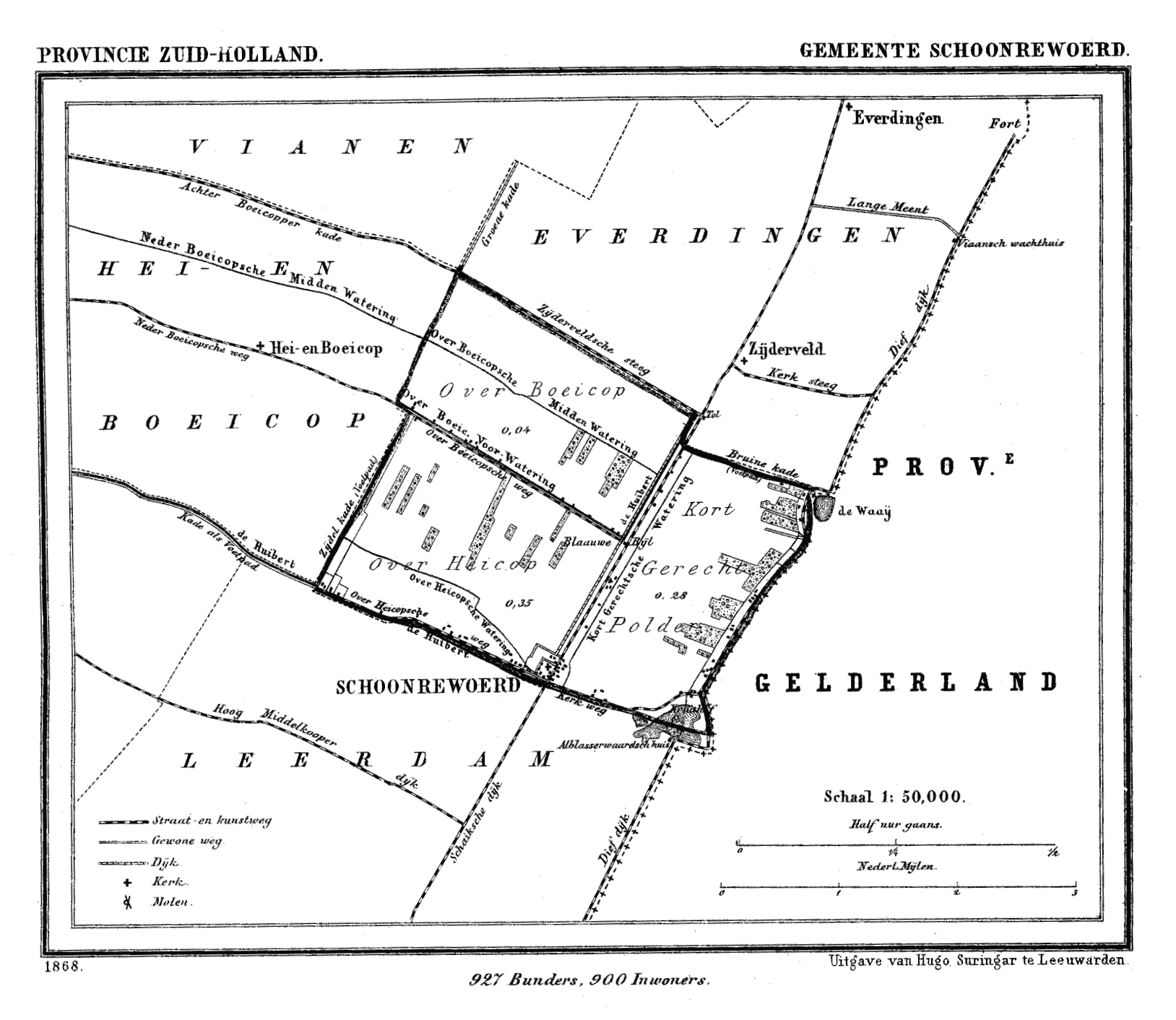
Schoonrewoerd in 1868.
