= Maasdam cheese =

Dutch medium-hard Alpine-type cheese

Maasdam
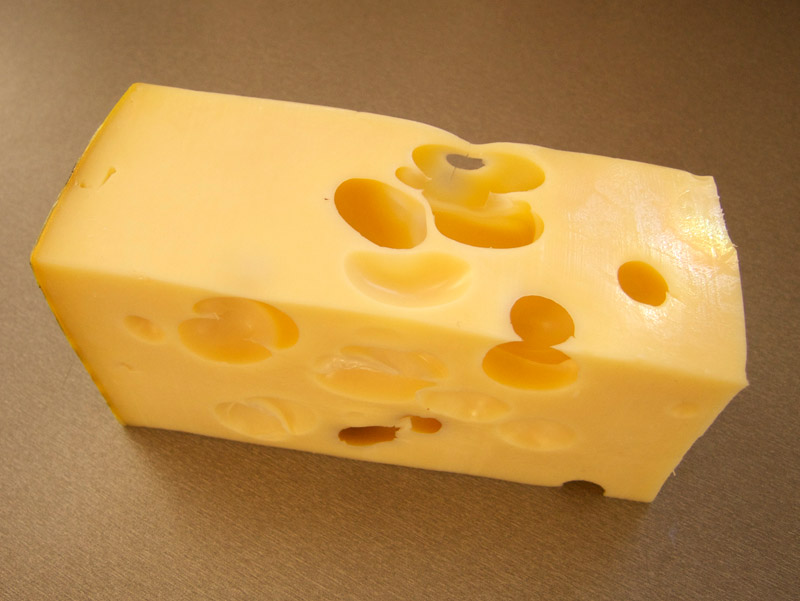
- Country of origin: Netherlands
- Source of milk: Cows
- Pasteurised: Yes
- Texture: Semihard
- Fat content: 45%
- Aging time: 1–3 months
- Named after: Maasdam

Maasdam cheese (Dutch pronunciation: [ˈmaːzdɑm]) is an Emmental-style Dutch cheese. Made from cow's milk, it is aged for at least four weeks. It ripens faster than other cheeses made in the Netherlands. Maasdam has internal voids, or holes from the ripening process, and a smooth, yellow rind. Sometimes, it is waxed like Gouda. The cheese was created to compete with Swiss Emmentaler cheeses by being less expensive and quicker to produce. In the process of making a cheese with the same general components as Swiss cheeses, the Dutch ended up with a cheese that is nutty and sweet, but softer than Emmental, due to a higher moisture content.

The style was introduced in 1984 by the Baars company as the trademarked Leerdammer cheese, although it is now made by other Dutch companies under the name Maasdammer. That name was selected to honor the village of Maasdam in the province of South Holland.

== See also ==
- List of cheeses
