= Graskaas =

Dutch cheese

Graskaas (a Dutch term that translates as "grass cheese") is the cheese made from the first milkings after cows are led to pasture, having spent the winter indoors. This milk is rich and produces a mild-flavored and creamy cheese; Cheese made from milk produced by cows indoors is called hooikaas, "hay cheese". Meikaas, "May cheese", is similar to graskaas, but is ripened even shorter. Graskaas is typically available in early summer, though an exceptionally mild spring in the year 1596 caused graskaas to be available on the Delft market on 28 March.

== See also ==
- List of cheeses
