= Kanterkaas =

Dutch cow's milk cheese

Kanterkaas, kanterkomijnekaas, kanternagelkaas
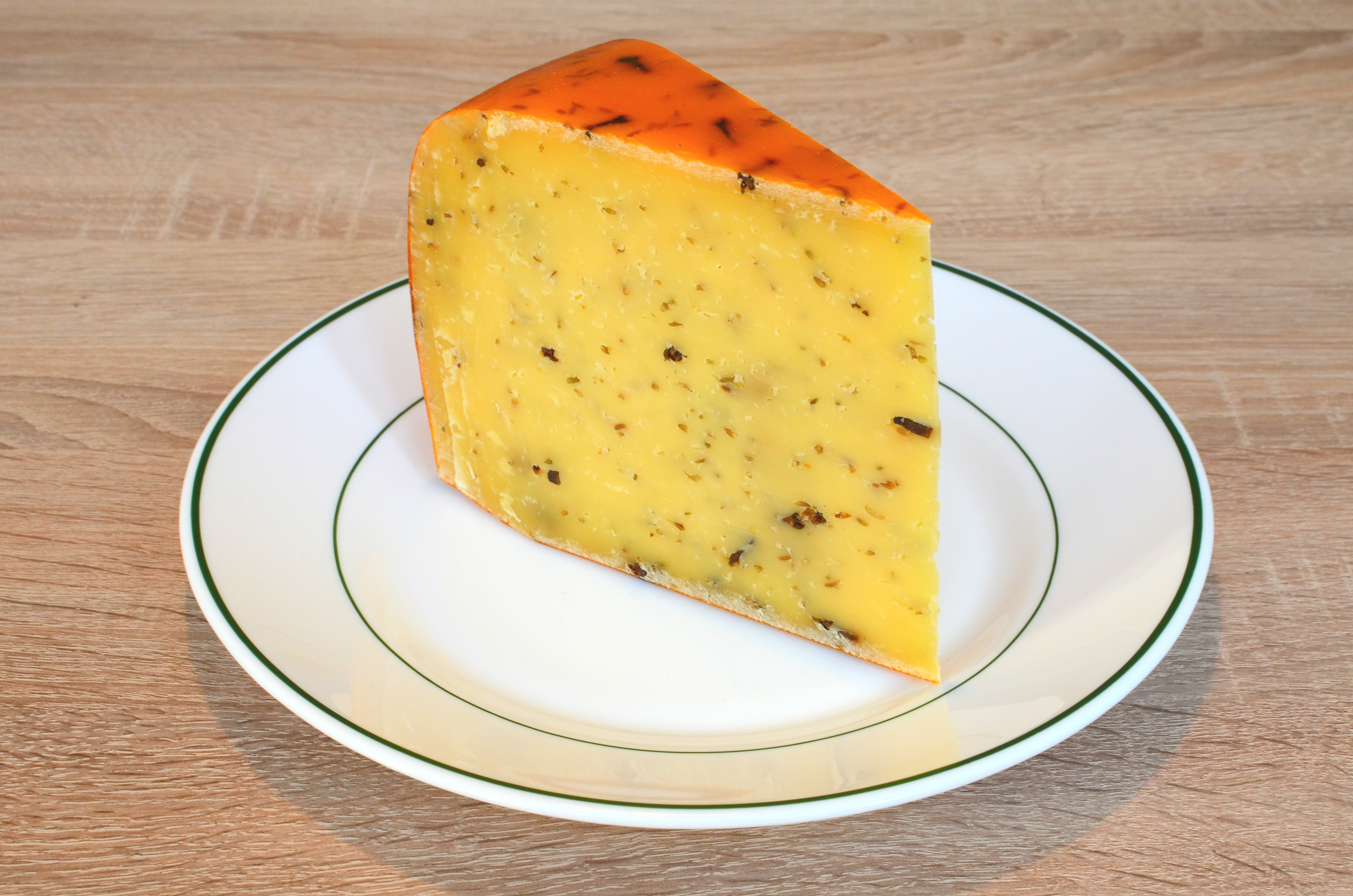
- Country of origin: Netherlands
- Region: Friesland, Westerkwartier
- Source of milk: Cows
- Pasteurised: Yes
- Texture: Hard
- Fat content: 20+: 20–25% 40+: 40–44%
- Weight: 3 kg (6.6 lb) to 8.5 kg (19 lb)
- Certification: PDO 2000

Kanterkaas is a Dutch yellow cheese made from cow's milk. Apart from the plain variety, there is Kanterkomijnekaas which is flavored with cumin and Kanternagelkaas flavored with both cumin and cloves. Kanter is Dutch for 'edge' and refers to the sharp angle at the point where the side of the cheese wheel meets the base. It was granted a Protected Designation of Origin by the European Union in 2000 and may only be produced in the province of Friesland and the Westerkwartier area. The unprotected name Frisian clove cheese (Dutch: Friese nagelkaas, or simply Nagelkaas) is commonly used for other Dutch cheeses which are similar to Kanternagelkaas.

== History ==
Due to the cold climate of the northern regions, dairy farming in the Netherlands originally amassed in Friesland and the Westerkwartier. Trading of Kanterkaas was documented in 1386 in Leeuwarden, and continued throughout the fifteenth and sixteenth century. In 1532, records show Kanterkaas being exported to Germany and England.

In 1725, a regulation law was passed to ensure no cheese was named Kanterkaas unless traditional spices were used in the production process – although this was later revoked. During the nineteenth century industrial revolution and a contemporary gain in popularity of Kanterkaas in England, cheese production in Friesland increased. It soon became the highest-produced cheese in the area. In 1890, milk and cheese production and processing began industrially in Friesland factories. Today, Friesland and Westkwartier continue to be the only permitted producers of Kanterkaas in the Netherlands.

== Production ==
Kanterkaas has a flat cylindrical shape. The edge between the side and the base is sharp, but rounded between the side and the top. Each cheese can weigh between 3 kg (6.6 lb) to 8.5 kg (19 lb).

The cheese is made in two fat content categories: 20+ and 40+. 20+ Kanterkaas contains a minimum of 20% and a maximum of 25% of fat in the dry matter. Twelve days after production, it must have a humidity content of not more than 48.5%. 40+ Kanterkaas has a fat content of 40–44% in the dry matter. Twelve days after production, it must have a humidity content of not more than 41.5%. The rind of Kanterkaas and Kanternagelkaas may be 'natural' or treated with a colorless or yellow coating material. In addition to these a red coating material may be used for Kanterkomijnekaas.

== Taste ==
The taste of the cheese changes noticeably as it ages. Plain kanterkaas has a pleasant and sharp to strong flavor. Kanterkomijnekaas is fragrant, flavored, pleasant and mild to strong. Kanternagelkaas tastes fragrant, flavored, pleasant and sharp to strong.
