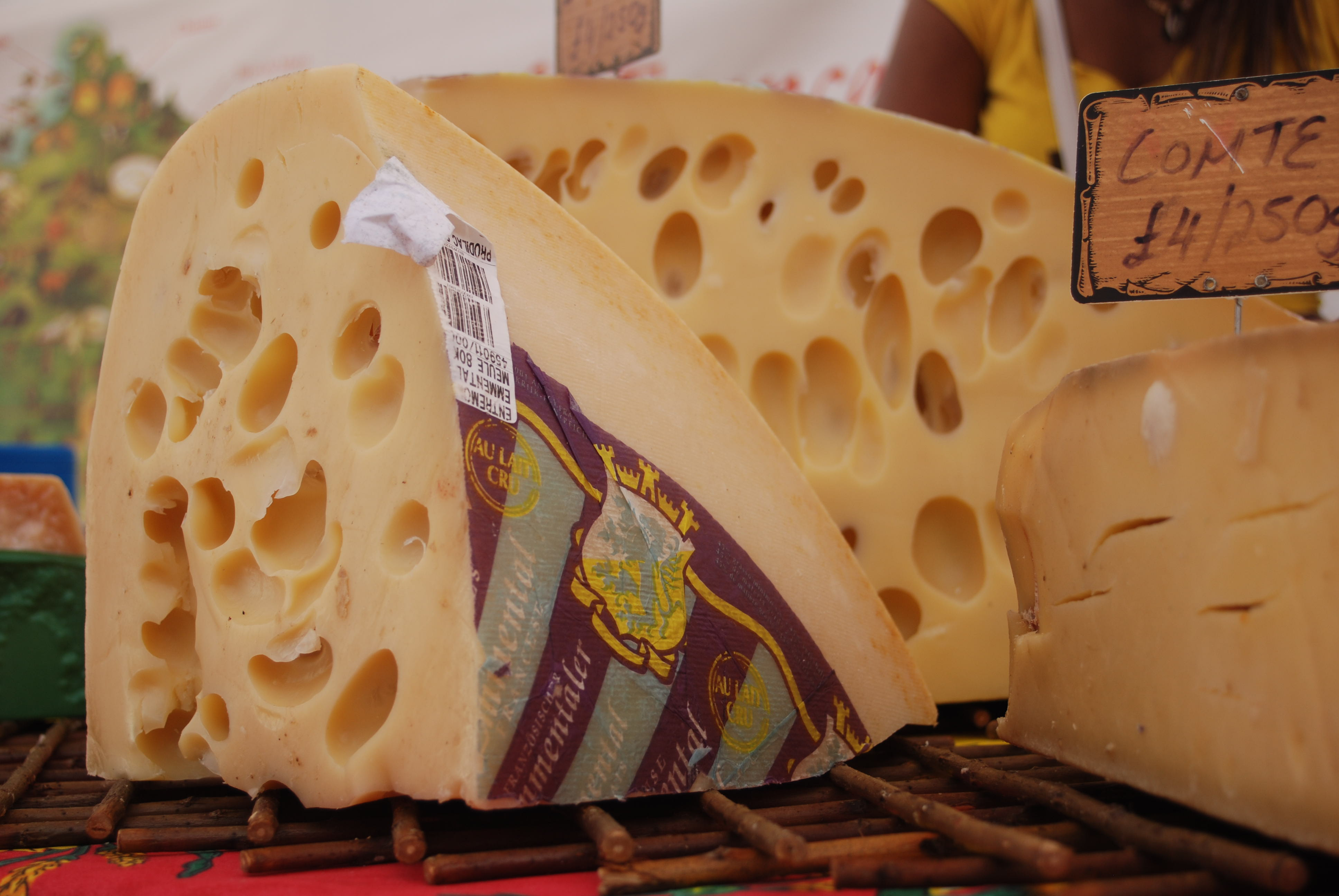
- Emmental cheese made using Propionibacterium freudenreichii subsp. shermanii

Scientific classification
- Domain: Bacteria
- Kingdom: Bacillati
- Phylum: Actinomycetota
- Class: Actinomycetes
- Order: Propionibacteriales
- Family: Propionibacteriaceae
- Genus: Propionibacterium; Orla-Jensen 1909 (Approved Lists 1980)

Type species
- Propionibacterium freudenreichii van Niel 1928 (Approved Lists 1980)

Species
- P. acidifaciens; P. australiense; P. cyclohexanicum; P. freudenreichii; P. ruminifibrarum; "P. westphaliense" Schlattmann et al. 2018

= Propionibacterium =

Genus of bacteria

Propionibacterium is a gram-positive, anaerobic, rod-shaped genus of bacteria named for their unique metabolism: They are able to synthesize propionic acid by using unusual transcarboxylase enzymes.

Its members are primarily facultative parasites and commensals of humans and other animals, living in and around the sweat glands, sebaceous glands, and other areas of the skin. They are virtually ubiquitous and do not cause problems for most people, but propionibacteria have been implicated in acne and other skin conditions. One study found the Propionibacterium was the most prevalent human skin-associated genus of microorganisms.

In ruminants, propionibacteria reduce nitrate to nontoxic nitrogen compounds.

Members of the genus Propionibacterium are widely used in the production of vitamin B_{12}, tetrapyrrole compounds, and propionic acid, as well as in the probiotics and cheese industries.

The strain Propionibacterium freudenreichii subsp. shermanii is used in cheesemaking to create CO_{2} bubbles that become "eyes"—round holes in the Swiss-type cheese.

== Pathology ==
Propionibacterium spp. are commensal bacteria that can occasionally cause infectious diseases. The most studied of these infections is acne vulgaris, caused by Cutibacterium acnes (formerly Propionibacterium acnes). It is a chronic inflammatory disease caused by the blockage of pilosebaceous units causing inflammatory lesions, non-inflammatory lesions or a mixture of both on the face, neck and/or chest. Acne vulgaris cannot be defined as an infectious disease since the bacteria is found on a vast majority of individuals without causing lesions. C. acnes colonize the skin only under certain favorable conditions. In most cases, C. acnes get trapped under the comedones where they proliferate to form micro-comedones, not visible to the naked eye, which can later form structures such as closed comedones (white heads) and open comedones. These comedones can rupture, releasing the follicular material inside the dermis. The cause of this rupture was thought to be the indirect effect of fat metabolism by the bacteria, however it was later found that bacteria are directly involved in comedome rupturing by producing factors such as proteases, hyaluronidases and neuraminidases which might be involved in thinning of the epithelium. C. acnes can also produce immune factors such as proinflammatory cytokine inducing-factors and chemotactic factors, and can induce host complement pathways.

== Phylogeny ==
The currently accepted taxonomy is based on the List of Prokaryotic names with Standing in Nomenclature (LPSN) and National Center for Biotechnology Information (NCBI).

16S rRNA based LTP_10_2024

- Propionibacterium
  - - P. cyclohexanicum Kusano et al. 1997
    - P. freudenreichii van Niel 1928 (Approved Lists 1980)
  - - P. acidifaciens Downes and Wade 2009
    - - P. australiense Bernard et al. 2002
      - P. ruminifibrarum Vaidya et al. 2019

120 marker proteins based GTDB 10-RS226

- Propionibacterium
  - - P. cyclohexanicum
    - P. freudenreichii
  - - P. acidifaciens
    - - P. australiense
      - P. ruminifibrarum

== See also ==
- List of bacterial orders
- List of bacteria genera
