= Prima Donna (cheese) =

Dutch cheese brand

Prima Donna is a Dutch cheese brand of Vandersterre Groep.
