= Boerenkaas =

Dutch cheese

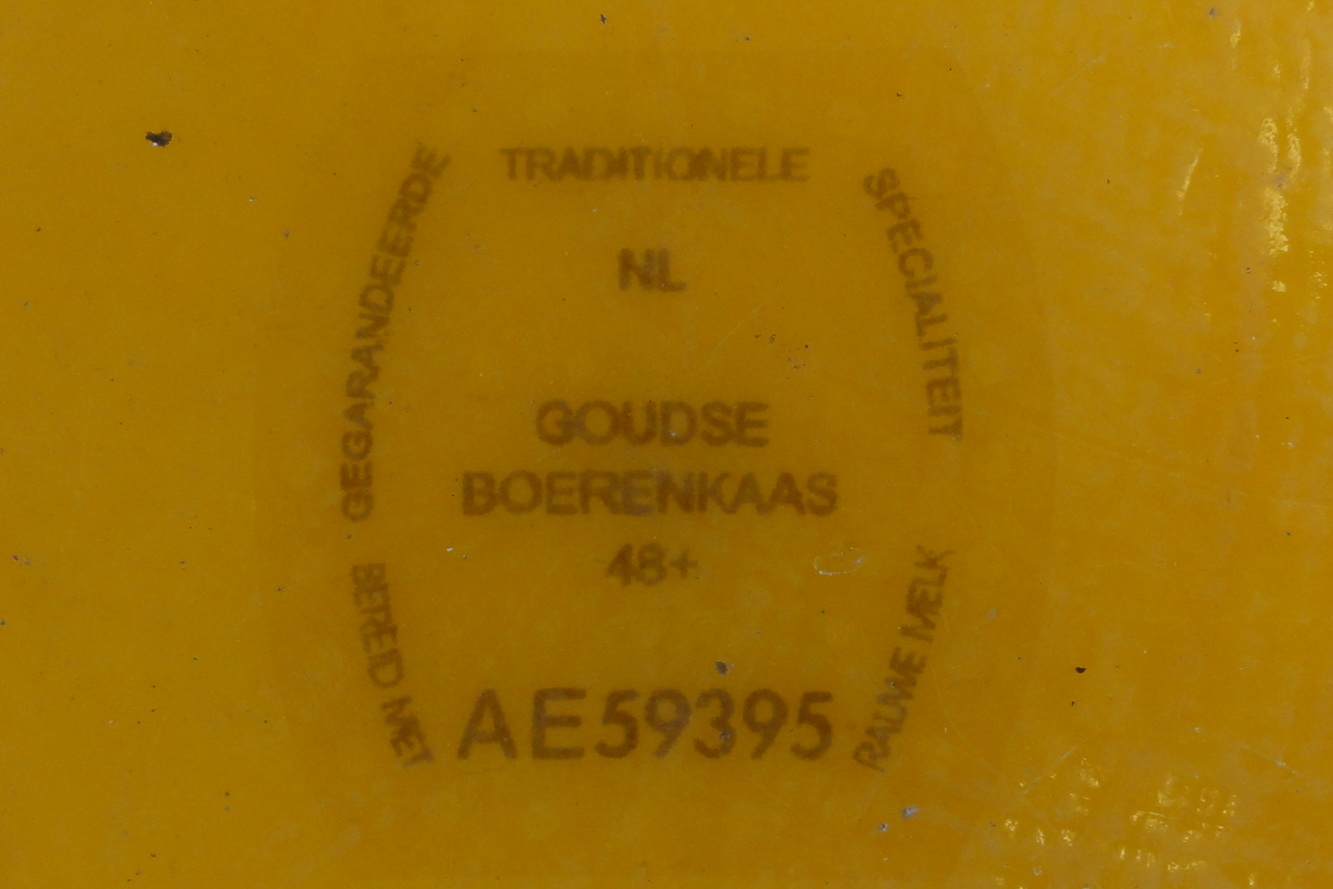
- Country of origin: Netherlands
- Source of milk: cows, buffalo, goats or sheep
- Pasteurised: no
- Texture: semi-hard
- Weight: 1–2 kg
- Certification: TSG

The making of Boerenkaas in 1943

Boerenkaas (Dutch: [ˌbuːrə(ŋ)ˈkaːs]; lit. 'farmers cheese') is a Dutch cheese, most of which is handmade from raw milk. The milk may be from cows, goats, sheep or buffalo; at least half of it must be from the farm where the cheese is made. The cheese may also contain cumin or other seeds, herbs, and spices.

The name has been protected as a Traditional Speciality Guaranteed by the European Union since 2007.

== Regulations ==
The name 'Boerenkaas' has been protected as a Traditional Speciality Guaranteed by the European Union since 2007.

Any cheese produced within the European Union according to the regulations laid down by the European Commission may be sold as Boerenkaas; cheese carrying the mark 'KB' is certified to be of Dutch origin.

The principal varieties are: Goudse Boerenkaas, from the area of Gouda; Edammer Boerenkaas, from that of Edam; and Leidse Boerenkaas, from that of Leiden. Other variants include Boerenkaas van geitenmelk from goat's milk, Boerenkaas van schapenmelk from sheep's milk and Boerenkaas van buffelmelk from buffalo's milk.

== Production ==
After the fresh unpasteurised milk has been heated to 29 °C, rennet is added. After about half an hour, the curd is cut into fine grains (as large as a pea), removing part of the whey. Hot water is then added (twice for cow's milk, with the curd first heated to 33 degrees and a quarter of an hour later to 36 degrees), and goat's milk, usually heated to 36 degrees at once. After half an hour of very slow stirring, the curd is poured into the moulds and, after a quarter of an hour of rest, the veins are well pressed. The cheese is left to rest and turned over to drain off any excess liquid.

The fresh cheese is then removed from the mould, turned upside down and marked with a mark, pressed and turned over several times. After pressing, the cheese is sprinkled with salt and immersed in brine for between 1 and 6 days, depending on the weight of the cheese. Finally, the cheeses are left to mature in the curing room, where they are turned over several times until they reach the desired degree of ripeness.
