= Leerdammer =

Dutch cheese

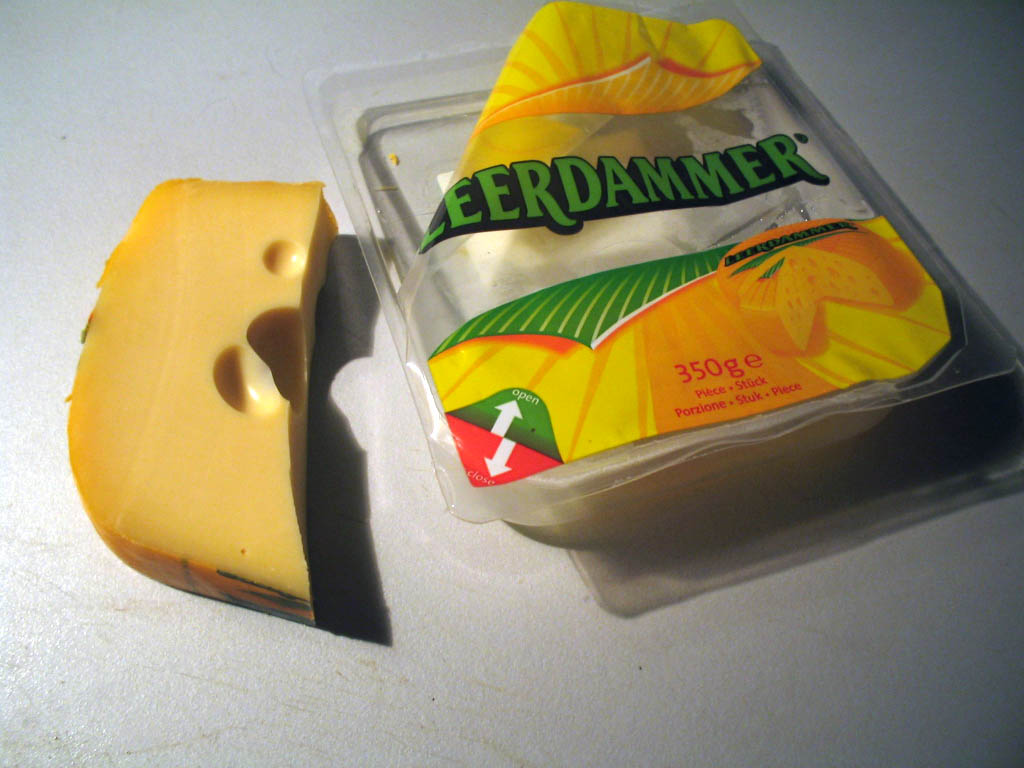
- Country of origin: Netherlands
- Region: Schoonrewoerd, Leerdam
- Source of milk: Cows
- Pasteurised: Yes
- Texture: Semihard
- Aging time: 3–12 months
- Certification: Trademark name
- Named after: Leerdam

Leerdammer (Dutch pronunciation: [leːrˈdɑmər]) is a trademarked brand of semihard Swiss-type cheese made from cow's milk, with an ageing time of around 3–12 months. It is produced in the Netherlands and France. It is pale yellow in colour with a creamy texture, and was made to be similar in appearance and flavour to Emmental. Its sweet and somewhat nutty flavour becomes more pronounced with age, and it has distinct holes. Advertisement campaigns have used the slogan "De lekkerste kaas tussen de gaten" ("the tastiest cheese between the holes").

Leerdammer cheese is produced exclusively by the Bel Group; its name, given after the city of Leerdam in the Netherlands, is a trademark of Bel Leerdammer B.V. (Generic cheese in this style is sold as Maasdam.) On 22 March 2021, Bel Group announced it was handing over the Leerdammer brand and its related assets to Lactalis in exchange for most of the shares Lactalis held in Bel Group; Lactalis was to retain a 0.9% stake.

Leerdammer cheese is produced in several factories: in Schoonrewoerd, which is in the municipality of Leerdam; in Dalfsen, which is in the eastern province of Overijssel; and in France. It is also available in supermarkets in Europe, Russia, and the US.

The cheese was developed by Cees Boterkooper, who had owned a small dairy in Schoonrewoerd since 1914, and Bastiaan Baars, who ran a cheese shop in a nearby village. The two met in 1970, and soon afterwards decided to collaborate. They set out to develop a cheese that could compete with Gouda and Edam. Leerdammer was launched in 1977.

Leerdammer cheese has holes because of bacteria that produce carbon dioxide gas as the cheese ripens. The bubbles that remain in the cheese after ripening, also often called "eyes", are a characteristic feature of various similar cheeses like Emmentaler.

== See also ==
- Jarlsberg cheese, a brand of similar cheese produced in Norway, Ireland, and the United States
- List of cheeses
