= Emmental cheese =

Swiss medium-hard Alpine cheese

Emmental
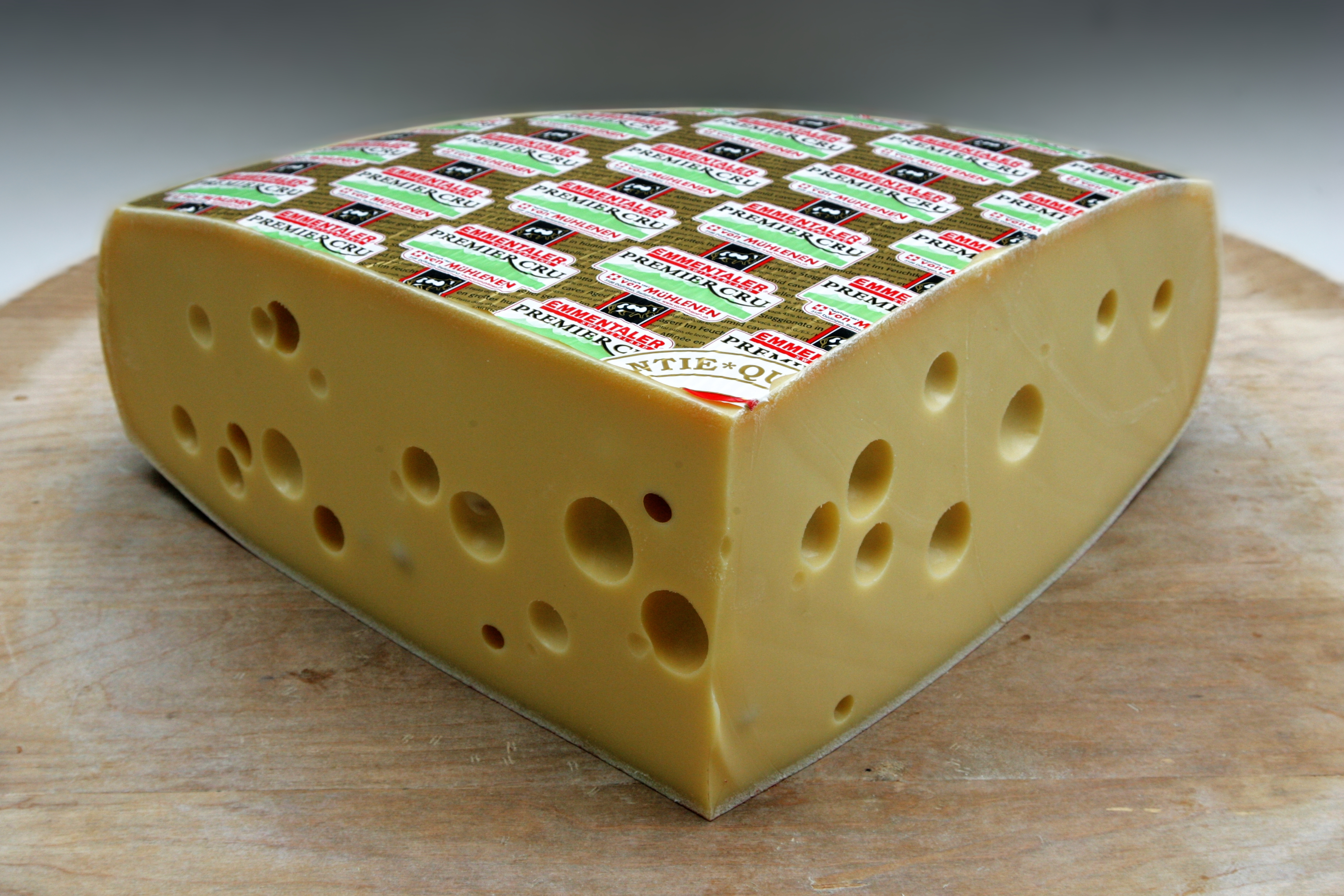
- Other names: Emmenthal, Emmentaler, Emmenthaler
- Country of origin: Switzerland
- Source of milk: Cow
- Pasteurized: Not traditionally
- Texture: Medium-hard
- Aging time: 2–18 months depending on variety
- Certification: Some varieties
- Named after: Emmental

Emmental (Note: Pronounced /ˈɛmənˌtɑːl/ EM-ən-TAHL; German: Emmentaler, local pronunciation: [ˈɛmn̩ˌtaːlər]) is a yellow, medium-hard cheese with natural holes that originated in the Emme Valley in Switzerland. It is classified as a Swiss-type cheese.

== History ==
Emmental cheese originates from the Emme Valley in Switzerland.

It has a savoury but mild taste. While "Emmentaler" is registered as a geographical indication in Switzerland, a limited number of countries recognise the term as a geographical indication: similar cheeses of other origins, especially from France (as "Emmental"), the Netherlands, Bavaria, and Finland, are widely available and sold by that name. In some parts of the world, the names "Emmentaler" and "Swiss cheese" are used interchangeably for Emmental-style cheese.

== Production ==
Three types of bacteria are needed to prepare Emmental: Streptococcus thermophilus, Lactobacillus helveticus, and Propionibacterium freudenreichii. Historically, the eyes were a sign of imperfection, and until modern times, cheese makers would try to avoid them. Nowadays, however, eye formation is valued as a sign of maturation and quality, and acoustic analysis has been developed for this purpose. Emmental cheese is usually consumed cold, as chunks or slices, and is also used in a variety of dishes, such as in gratins.

Ziger, a whey cheese, is a by-product of the manufacture of Emmental.

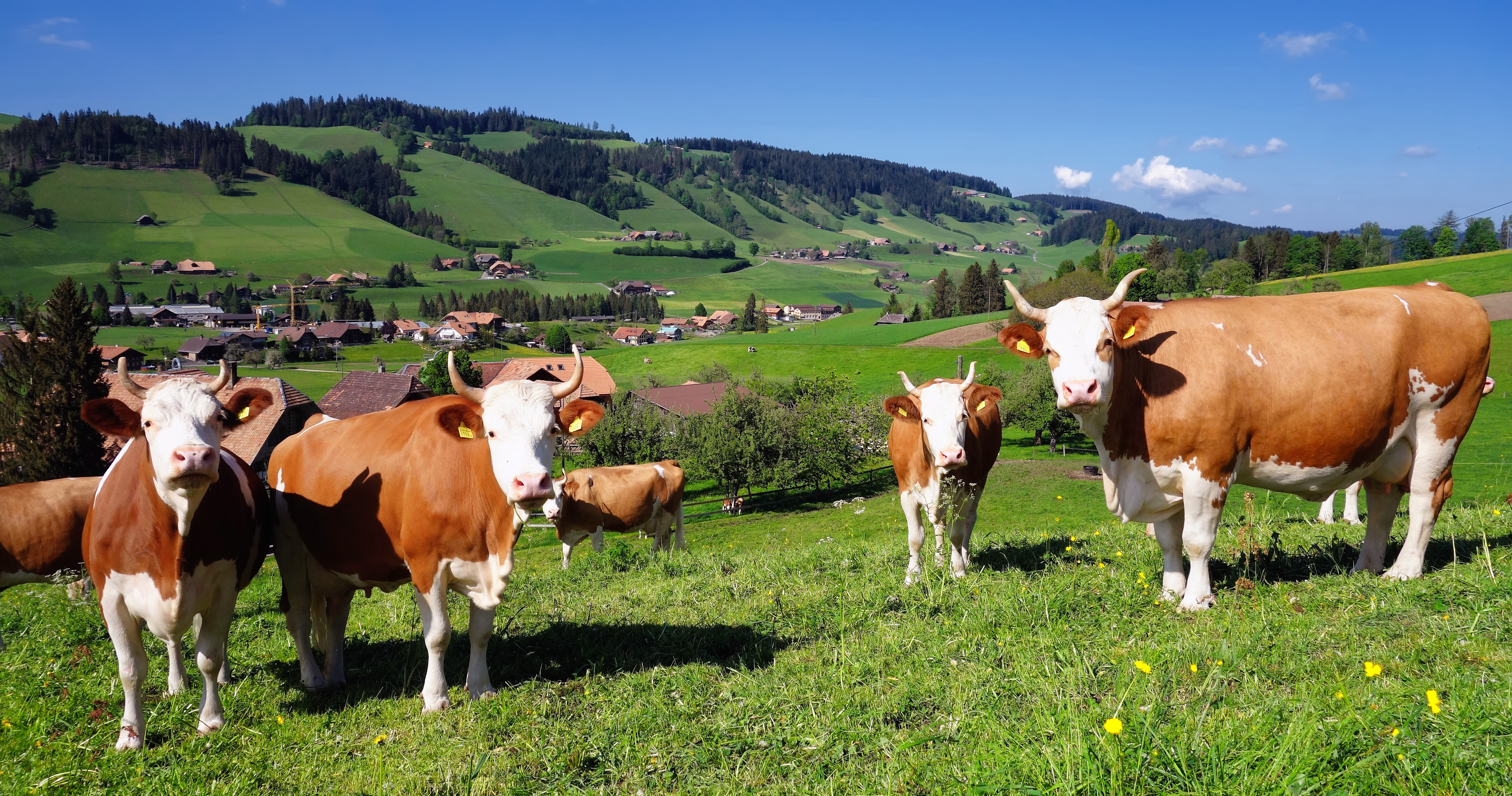
Dairy cows in the Emmental region

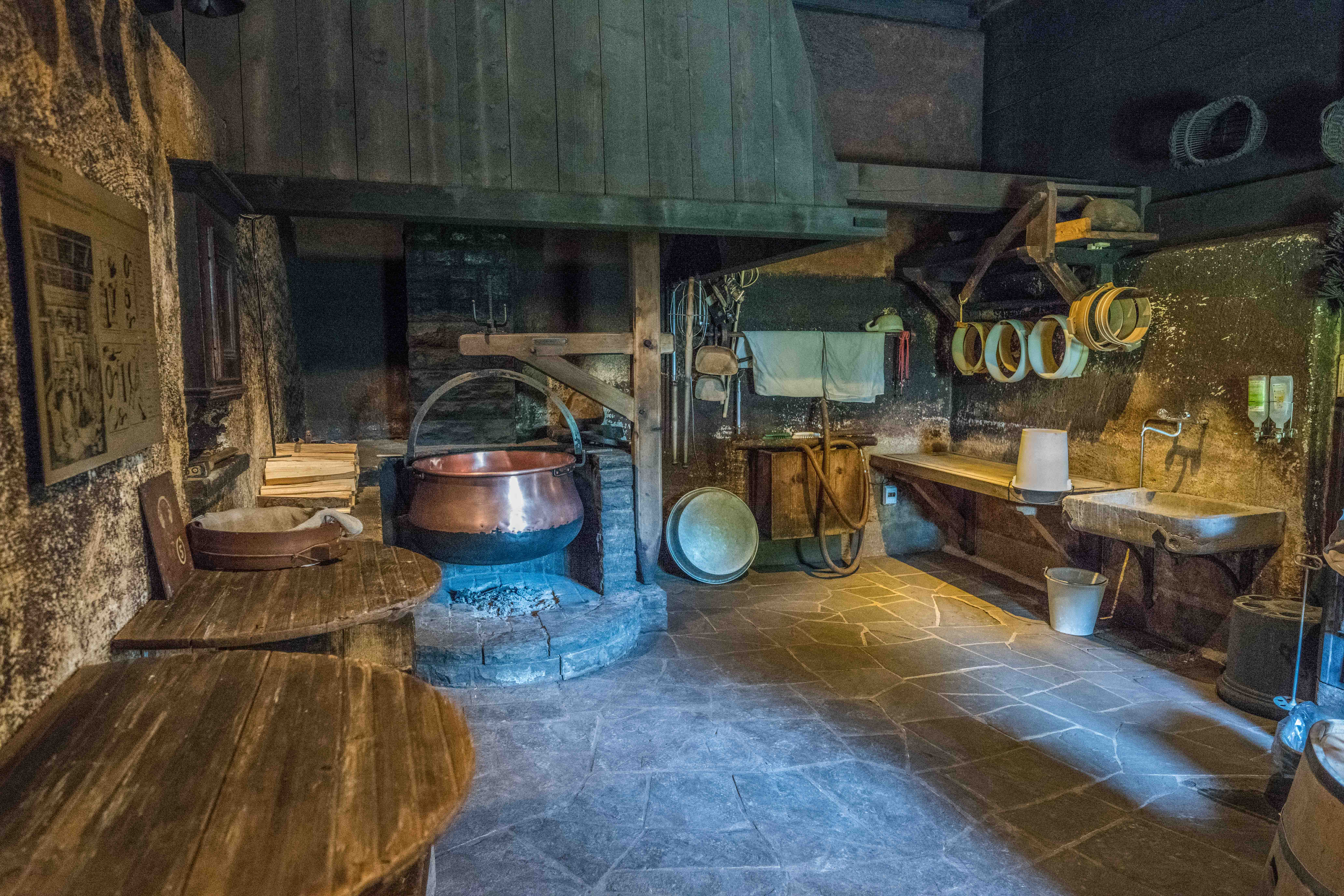
Old production facility

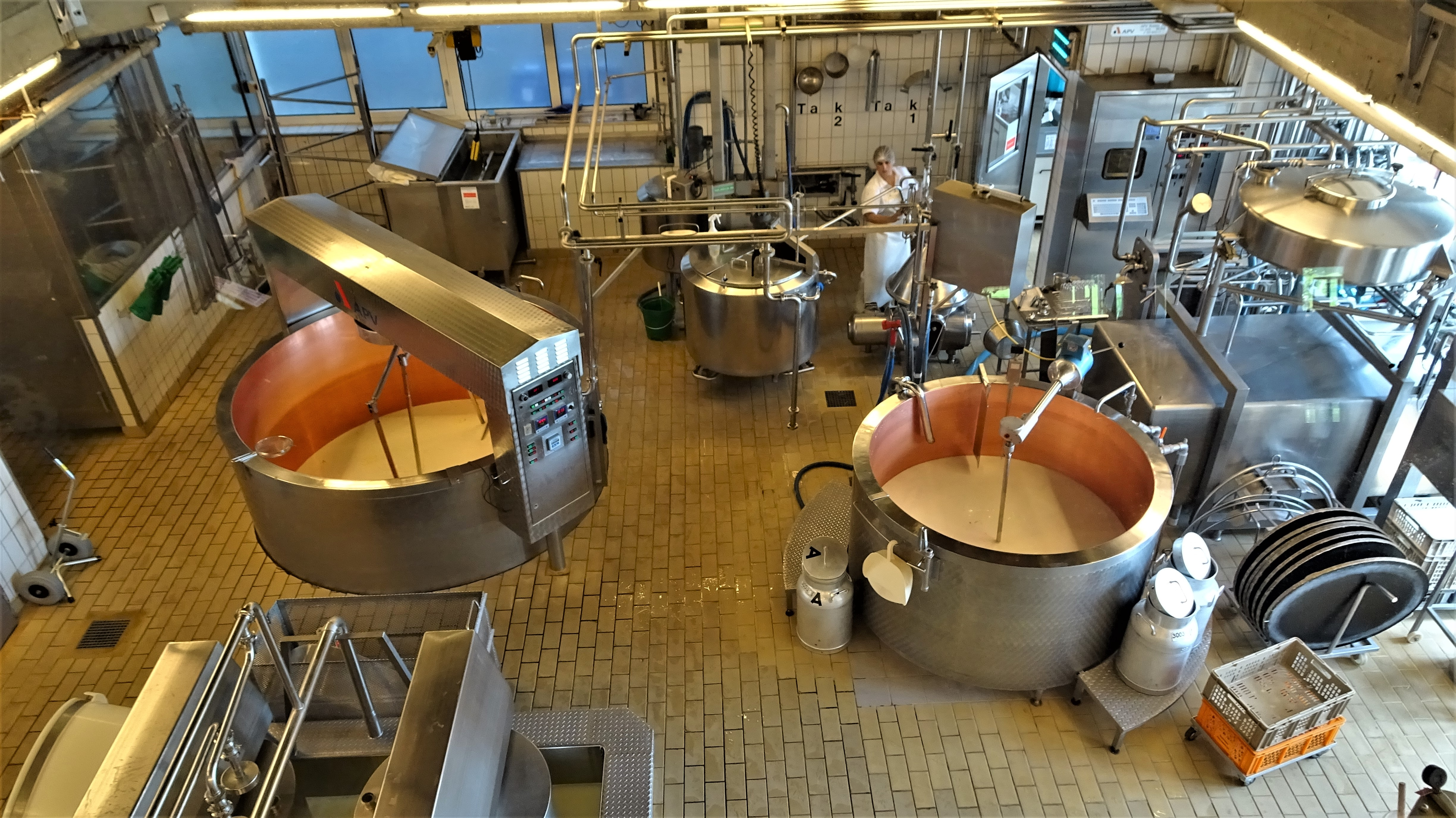
Emmental being produced in a modern facility

=== Natural holes in cheese ===
In the 21st century it was discovered that the presence of the holes is due to microscopic hay dust that has been introduced into the milk during milking as well as bacterial activity. Bacteria grow around the dust particles and produce gases which cause the characteristic holes. In addition to their traditionally favoured appearance, the holes, if not too small, have the beneficial effect of preventing gaps and cracks in the block of cheese from forming. There was some suggestion in the past of a variable effect; Emmental cheese made from summer milk had smaller holes than winter cheese—the cows ate hay in winter, but grass with less dust in summer. Modern production techniques and milking machines are less susceptible to hay dust, and indeed 21st-century Swiss cheeses have fewer and smaller holes.

Holes can be restored to their former size and prevalence by adding hay flower powder to the milk; this is done in Germany and France, but such additives are forbidden in Swiss cheeses.

== Protected varieties and nomenclature ==
Several varieties of Emmental are registered as geographical indications, including:

=== Switzerland ===
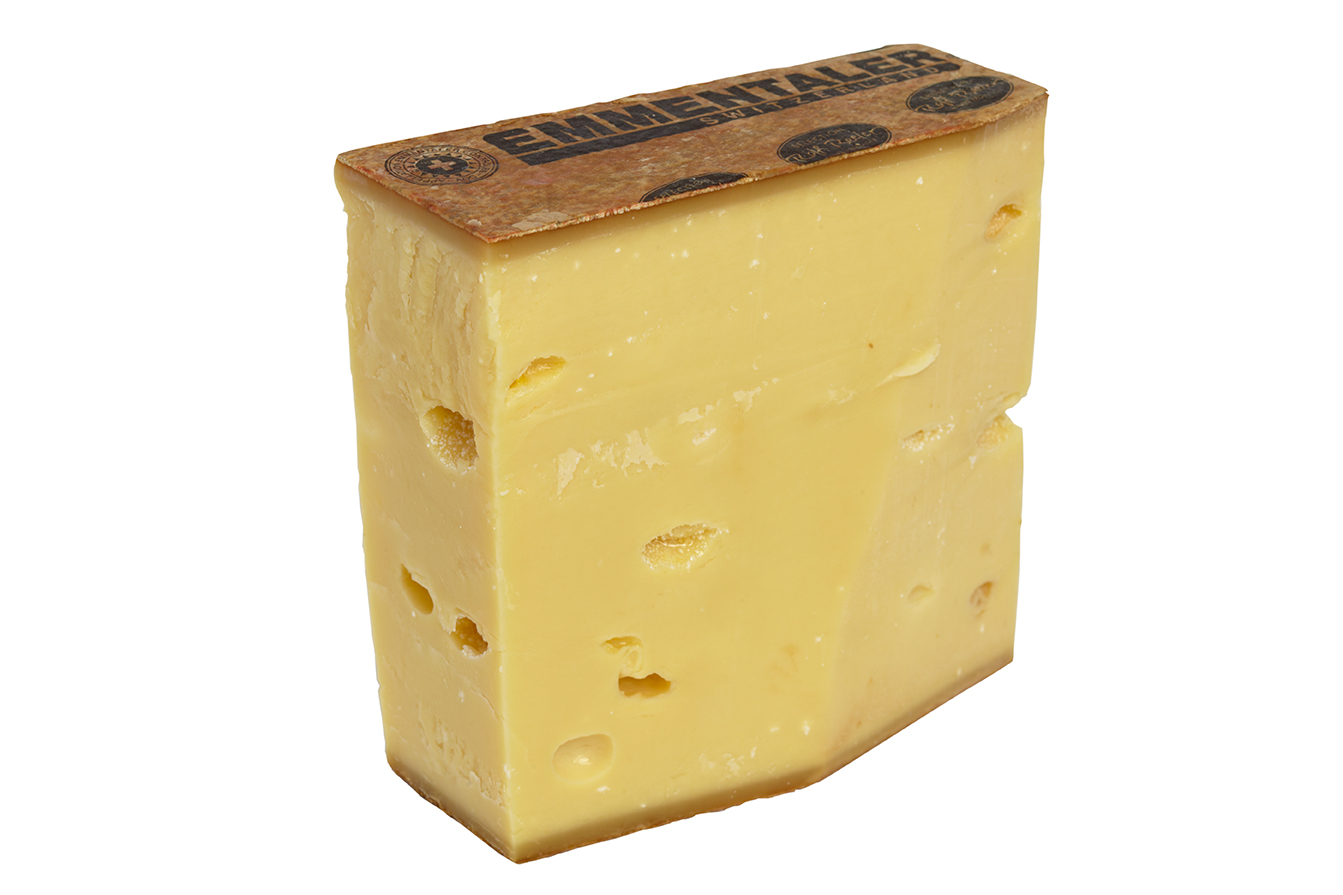
Eighteen-month-old raw milk Emmentaler AOC

Emmentaler was registered in 2000 as an appellation d'origine contrôlée (AOC) in Switzerland. In 2013, it was replaced by the appellation d'origine protégée (AOP) certification. The Emmentaler produced according to the AOC-registration needs to be produced in small rural dairies with raw cow's milk, adding only natural ingredients (water, salt, natural starter cultures and rennet); preservatives or ingredients from genetically modified organisms are not allowed. The cheese is produced in a round shape with a natural rind, and aged in traditional cellars for a minimum of four months. Emmentaler must be produced in cantons of Aargau, Bern (except Amtsbezirk Moutier), Glarus, Luzern, Schwyz, Solothurn, St Gallen, Thurgau, Zug or Zurich, or in the See- and Sensebezirk of canton of Freiburg.

Sales of AOP Emmental have fallen by approximately 70% between the 1990s and 2026. The research institute Agroscope and the industry association have developed a new recipe to give it a more pronounced flavour and attempt to halt this decline.

=== Outside Switzerland ===
Emmentaler is also recognised as a geographical indication in the Czech Republic, France, Georgia, Germany, Hungary, Jamaica, Portugal, Russia, Slovakia and Spain.

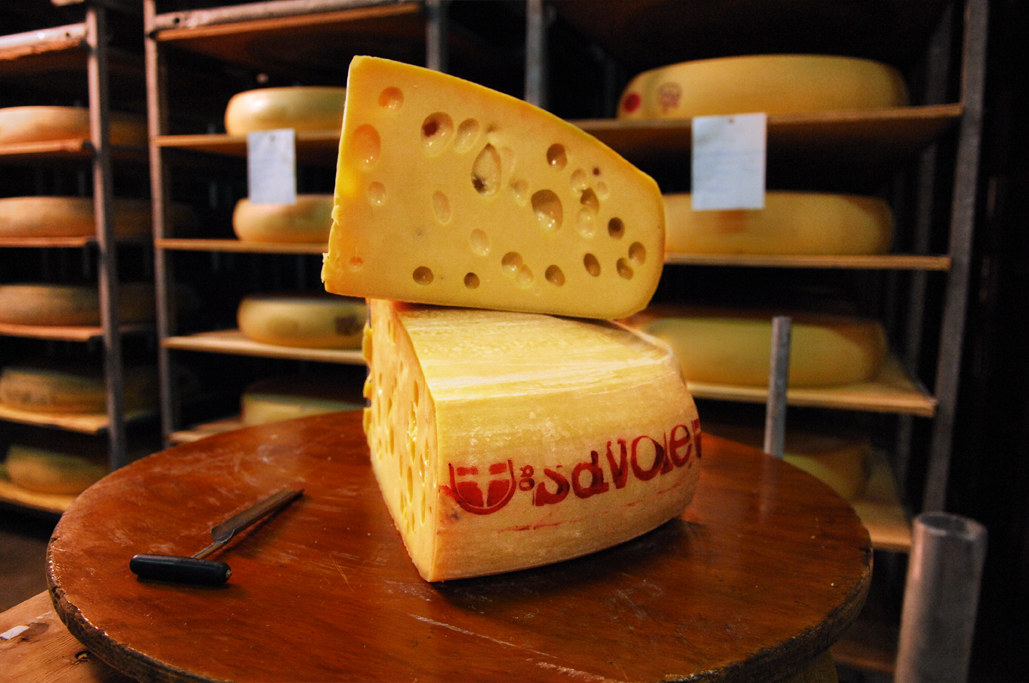
Emmental de Savoie from France

Three cheeses that are not of Swiss origin but that contain the word Emmental, are also protected under EU law :

- Allgäuer Emmentaler, from Bavaria, Germany, has PDO status
- Emmental de Savoie, from Savoie, France, has PGI status
- Emmental français est-central from Franche-Comté, France, also has PGI status

In many parts of the English-speaking world the terms "Emmentaler" and "Swiss cheese" are both used to refer to any cheese of the Emmental type, whether produced in Switzerland or elsewhere. The United States Department of Agriculture, for example, uses the terms "Swiss cheese" and "Emmentaler cheese" interchangeably.

== Emmental-style cheeses ==
Emmental cheese is very widely imitated around the world, often just called "Swiss cheese". Specific Emmental-style cheeses types include:

- Colonia cheese from Nueva Helvecia in Uruguay
- Grevé from Sweden
- Jarlsberg cheese from Norway
- Kars gravyer from Turkey
- Maasdam cheese from the Netherlands, with Leerdammer being one variety

== See also ==
- List of Swiss cheeses
- Swiss cheeses and dairy products
- Culinary Heritage of Switzerland
