= Eyes (cheese) =

Round holes in cheese

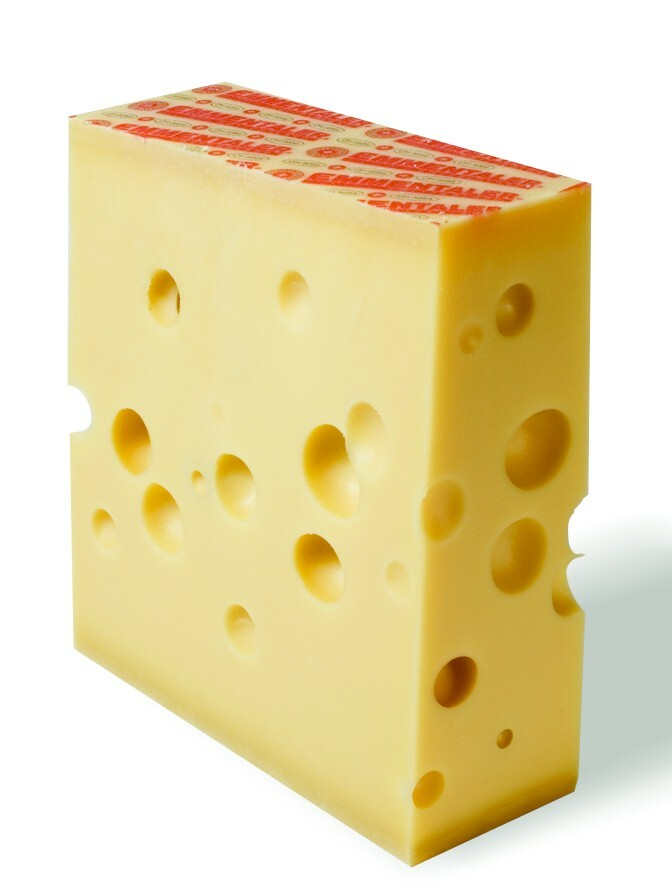
Emmentaler with eyes

Eyes are the round holes that are a characteristic feature of some Swiss-type cheeses (e.g. Emmentaler cheese) and some Dutch-type cheeses. The eyes are formed by bubbles of carbon dioxide gas during the cheesemaking process. The gas is produced by various species of bacteria in the cheese.

== Swiss cheese ==
In Swiss-type cheeses, the eyes form as a result of the activity of propionic acid bacteria (Propionibacteria), notably Propionibacterium freudenreichii subsp. shermanii. These bacteria transform lactic acid into propionic acid and carbon dioxide, according to the formula:

3 lactate → 2 propionate + acetate + CO_{2} + H_{2}O

The CO_{2} so produced accumulates at weak points in the curd, where it forms the bubbles that become the cheese's eyes. Not all CO_{2} is so trapped: in an 80 kg (180 lb) cheese, about 20 L of CO_{2} remain in the eyes, while 60 L remain dissolved in the cheese mass and 40 L are lost from the cheese.

In Swiss cheese production, the number and size of eyes declined in the 2000s. This was due to increased hygiene standards, which reduced the number of dust particles in the milk around which gas bubbles form. In 2025, the Swiss Federal Administrative Court approved the addition of hay flower powder (a mixture of various wildflowers and grasses) to the milk during cheesemaking, to allow for eyes of the typical number and size to form.

== Dutch cheese ==
In Dutch-type cheeses, the CO_{2} that forms the eyes results from the metabolisation of citrate by citrate-positive ("Cit+") strains of lactococci.

== Bibliography ==
- Polychroniadou, A. (2001). Eyes in cheese: a concise review. Milchwissenschaft 56, 74–77.
