= Beemster cheese =

Dutch cow's milk cheese

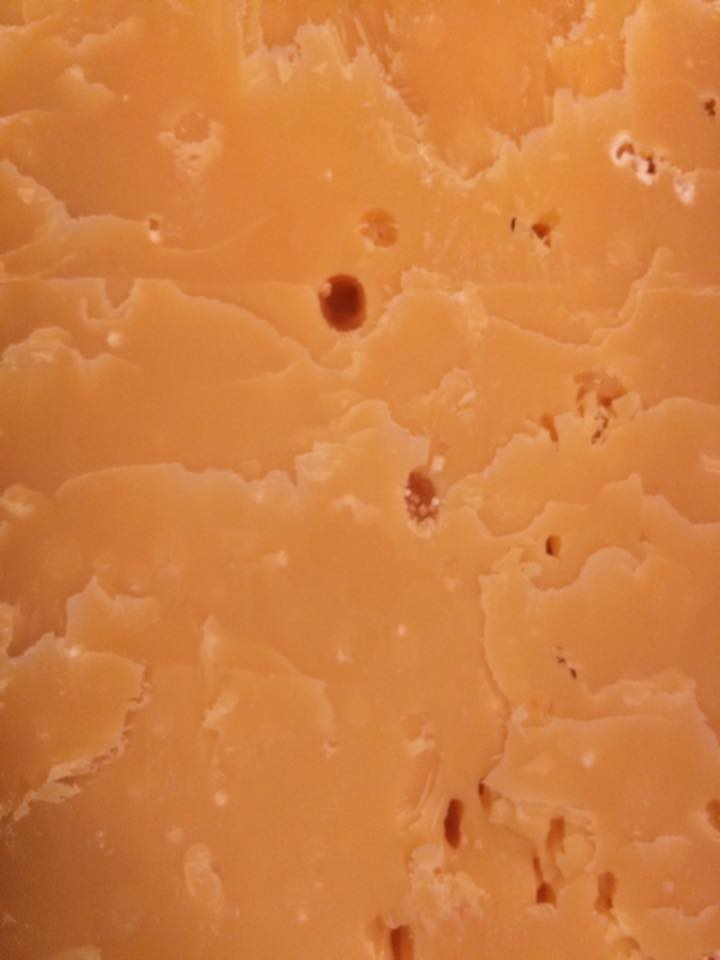
A close-up view of Beemster cheese.

Beemster cheese is a hard, Dutch cow's milk cheese. Production of Beemster is similar to other hard cheeses, such as Gouda. The specific taste of Beemster stems from the ingredients (milk from grass grown on sea-clay in a polder 4 meters below sea-level), that part of the production process (the stirring of the curd) is done by hand, and that the cheeses are ripened in changing conditions.

== History ==
After the completion of the Beemster-polder in 1612, farming was made possible. The new land, four meters below sea-level, was fertile and suitable for agriculture and dairy farming. Until 1901, most of the dairy farmers delivered their milk and home-made cheese to local merchants. The dependency on these merchants did not always please them.

In 1901, a number of dairy farmers in several villages all decided to start cooperatives. The different cooperatives built small cheese factories. One of these was the cooperative Wilhelmina, opened in 1907. In 1930, they joined with another factory in the polder, De Unie, forming the joint cooperative cheesemaking facility called De Tijd ("The Time").

In 1947, two other cooperatives (Concordia from Oudendijk and Ons Belang from Middelie) joined to form De Combinatie ("The Combination"). In 1950, the cheese factory Neerlandia in Stompetoren was added. Finally, in 1991, De Combinatie joined with another cooperative, De Vechtstreek, forming CONO Cheesemakers.

In the seventies, there was growing competition in the Dutch cheese market. This led to the introduction of Beemster kaas (Beemster cheese). Its handicraft nature results from the hand-stirring of the curd plus the ripening in different temperatures and humidities.

CONO has about 475 farmers, and is one of the country's smallest such cooperatives; it produces about 30,000 tons of Beemster each year. In 2001, the Queen of The Netherlands awarded the title 'By Appointment to the Court of the Netherlands'. Beemsterkaas is one of the main attractions of the area.

Today CONO makes a wide variety of cheeses all based on the Beemster cheese. They also are the exclusive provider of milk to Ben & Jerry's in Europe.
