= Gouda cheese =

Dutch yellow cheese made from cow's milk

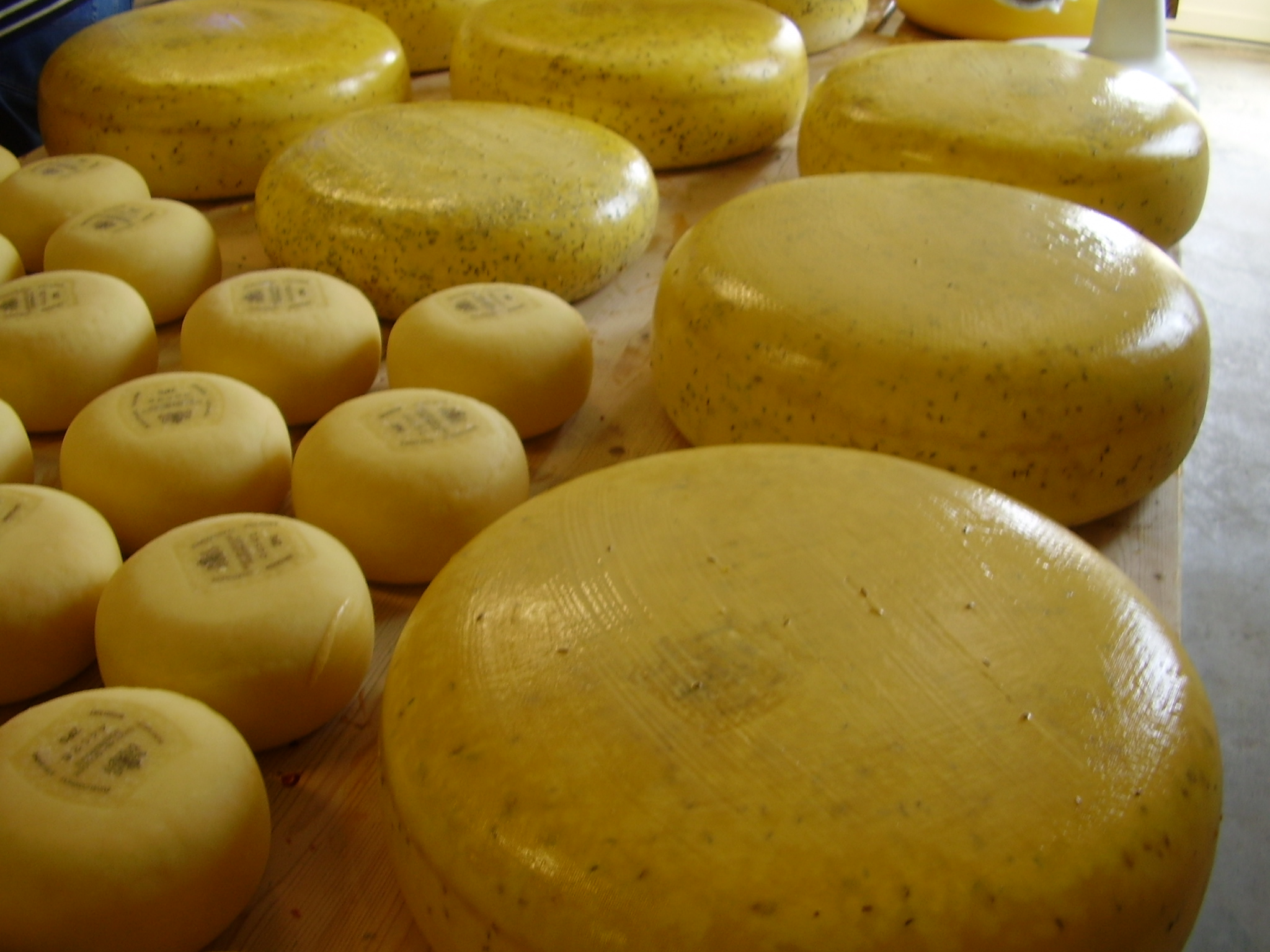
- Gouda cheese
- Other names: Goudse kaas
- Country of origin: Netherlands
- Region: South Holland
- Town: Gouda
- Source of milk: Cows
- Pasteurised: Possibly
- Texture: Semi-hard to hard
- Aging time: 1–36 months
- Named after: Gouda

Gouda cheese (/ˈɡaʊdə/, Dutch: [ˈɣʌudaː]; Dutch: Goudse kaas, "cheese from Gouda") is a family of yellow cow's milk cheeses originally from the Netherlands. Gouda ranges from young and elastic to old and hard, and from low-fat to high-fat.

Gouda today is a generic name for numerous similar cheeses, which are popular and widely produced worldwide.

== History ==
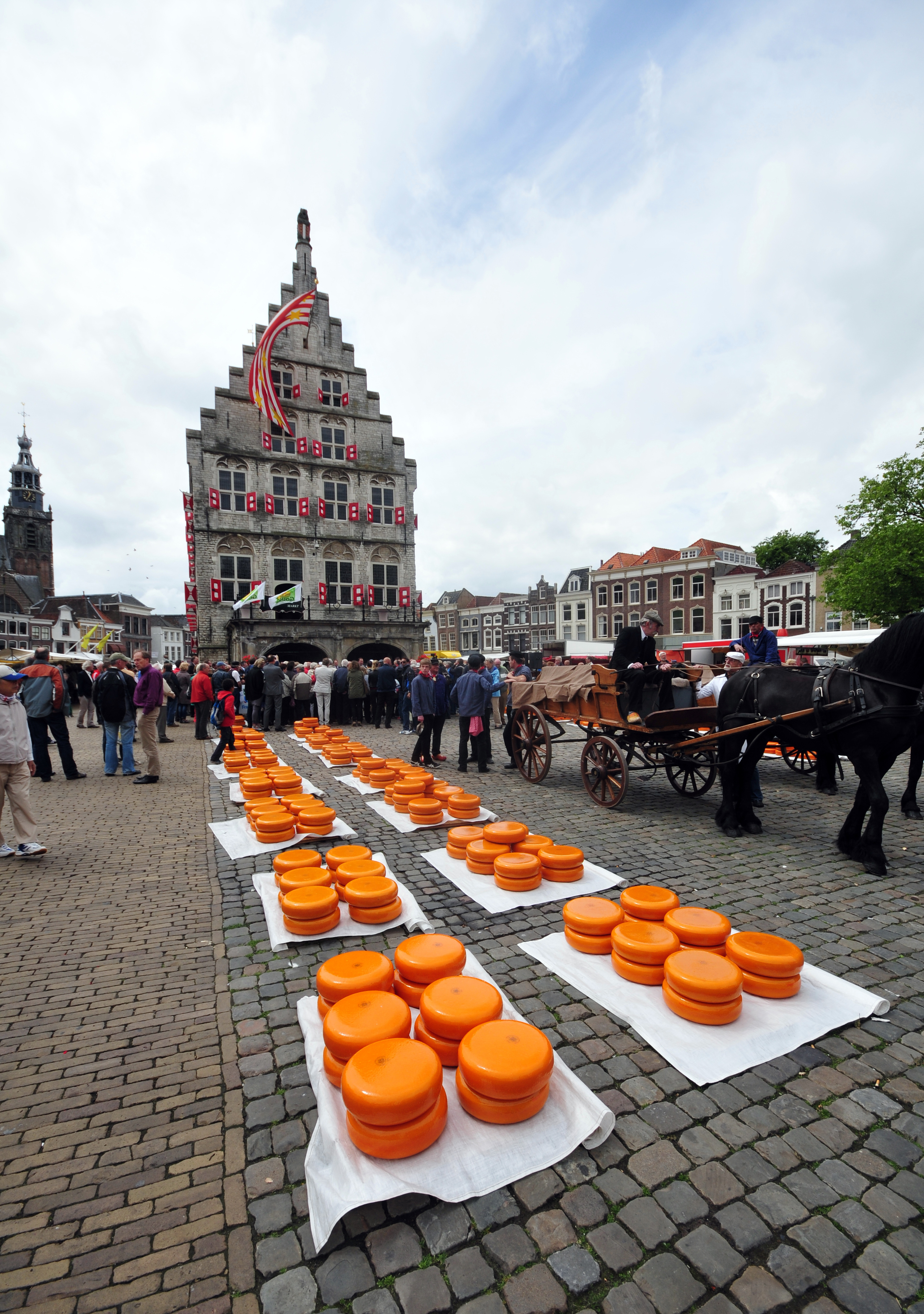
Rounds of Gouda cheese at a Dutch cheese market in Gouda, South Holland

The cheese is named after the city of Gouda, South Holland. All the cheeses would be taken to the market square in Gouda to be sold. Teams consisting of the guild of cheese-porters, identified by distinct differently coloured straw hats, carried the farmers' cheeses, which typically weighed about 16 kg (35 lb), in barrows. Buyers then sampled the cheeses and negotiated a price using a ritual bargaining system called handjeklap in which buyers and sellers clap each other's hands and shout out various prices. Once a price was agreed upon, the porters would carry the cheese to the weighing house and complete the sale. Modern Gouda had evolved by the Dutch Golden Age of the 17th century.

Cheesemaking traditionally was a woman's task in Dutch culture, with farmers' wives passing their cheesemaking skills onto their daughters. Most Dutch Gouda is now produced industrially. However, some 300 Dutch farmers still produce boerenkaas ("farmer's cheese"), which is a protected form of Gouda made in the traditional manner, using unpasteurised milk.

== Process ==
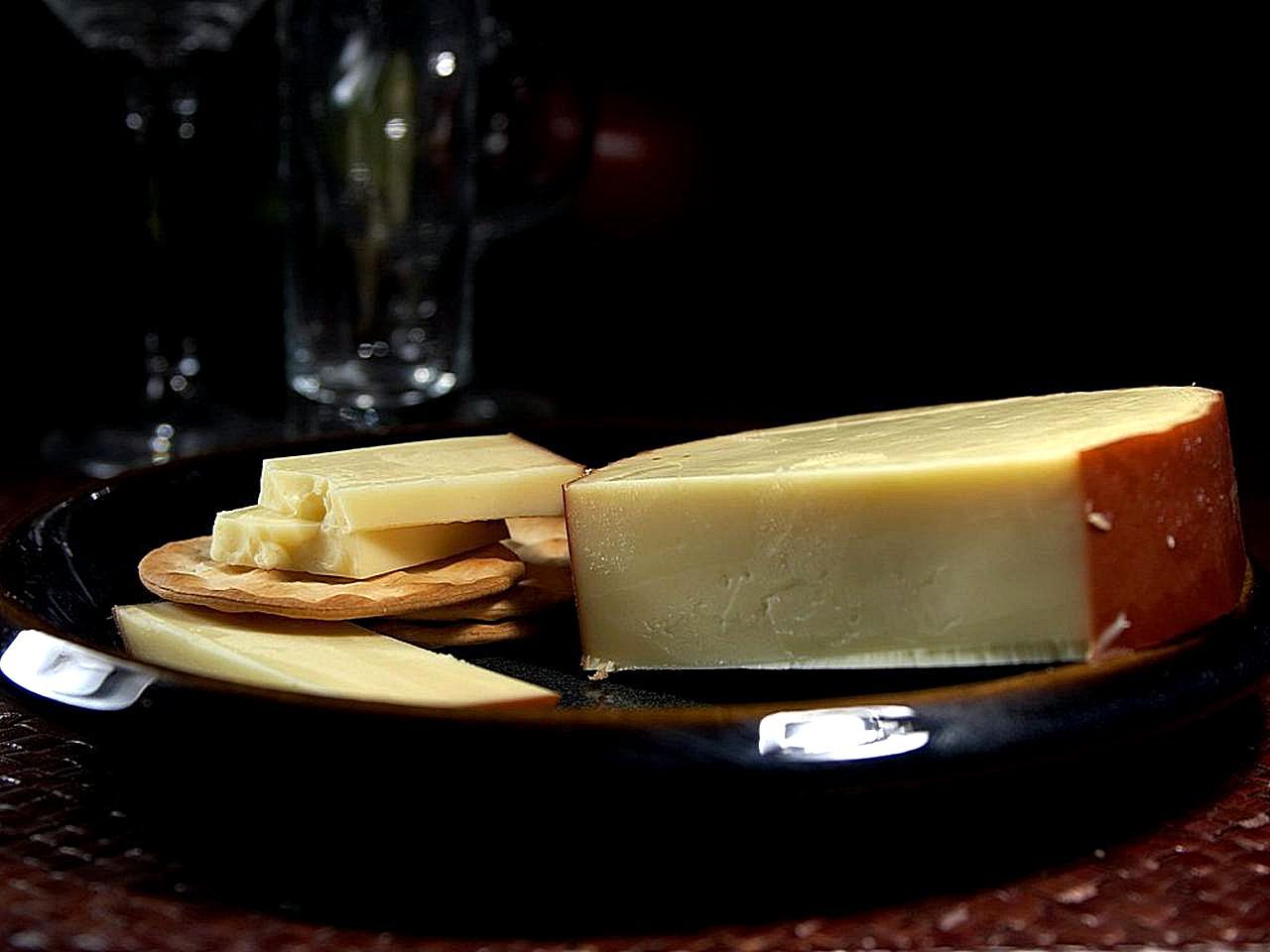
Smoked Gouda

Young (and factory-produced) Gouda has been described as having a flavour that is "lightly fudgy with nuts, but very, very, very mild", while a more mature farmhouse Gouda has a "lovely fruity tang" with a "sweet finish", that may take on "an almost butterscotch flavour" if aged over two years.

After cultured milk is curdled, some of the whey is drained and water is added to the batch, making Gouda a washed-curd cheese. This makes the cheese sweeter by removing some of the lactose, resulting in a reduction of lactic acid. About 10% of the mixture is curds, which are pressed into circular moulds for several hours. The moulds define Gouda's characteristic shape. The cheese is then soaked in brine, which gives the cheese and its rind a distinctive taste.

The cheese is dried for a few days before being coated with a yellow wax or plastic-like coating to prevent it from drying out. It is then aged, which hardens the cheese and develops its flavour. Dutch cheese makers generally use six gradations, or categories, to classify the cheese:

1. Young (4 weeks)
2. Young matured (8–10 weeks)
3. Matured (16–18 weeks)
4. Extra matured (7–9 months)
5. Old (10–12 months)
6. Very old (12–21 months)

As it ages, it develops a caramel sweetness and has a slight crunchiness from cheese crystals, especially in older cheeses. In the Netherlands, cubes of Gouda are often eaten as a snack served with Dutch mustard. Older varieties are sometimes topped with sugar or apple butter. Cubes of Gouda are commonly served as a snack along with beer in Dutch Bruin cafés.

== Sensory and chemical properties ==
=== Chemical properties ===
Gouda cheese has variable moisture content, 25-46%; fat content, 21-49% by weight, 37-80% of dry matter; and salt content, 0.9-2.4%.

Six compounds are the principal sources of Gouda's flavor and aroma: diacetyl, 2-methylbutanal, 3-methylbutanal, methional, ethyl butyrate, and acetic acid.

=== Flavour ===
Depending on its age, Gouda exhibits a wide range of flavours: from mild and creamy, to harsh and acidic. These flavours develop as Gouda cheeses reach the medium stage of maturation; showing extra whey, sour aromatics, and a somewhat cooked or milky essence are indicators of the cheese's increasing complexity. Matured Gouda has a rich, caramel-like flavour, developed after prolonged ripening, along with brothy and malty or nutty undertones. Depending on how long the cheese has been aged, the finish can range from silky to sharp.

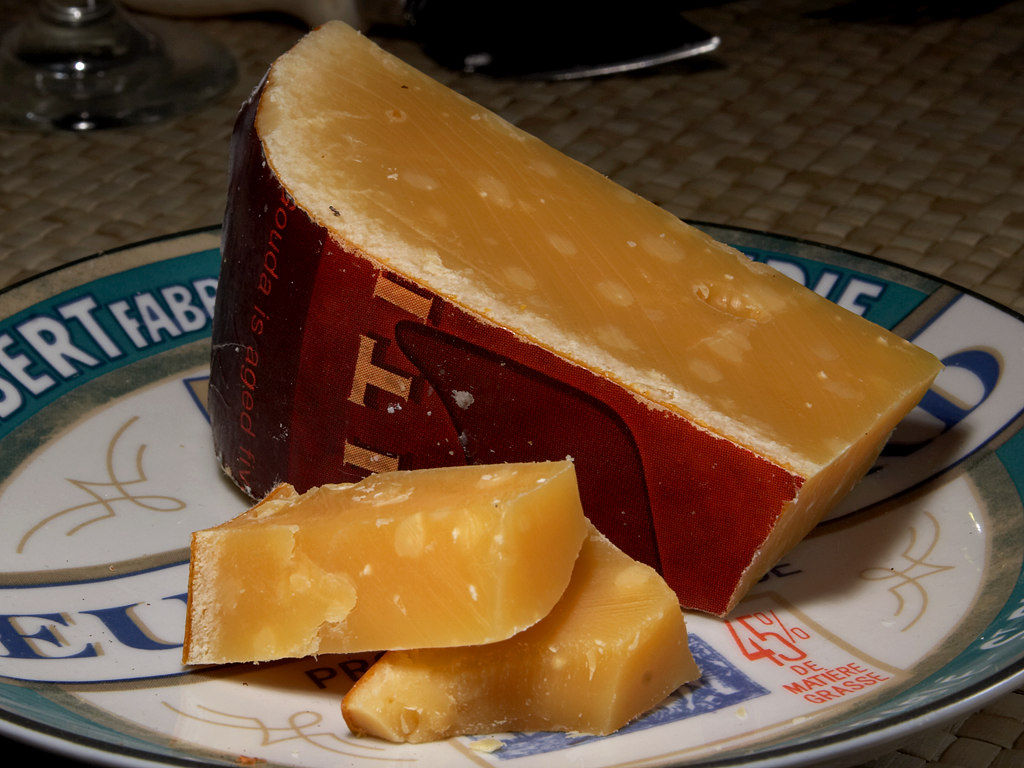
Aged Gouda cheese

=== Appearance and texture ===
Gouda cheese has a solid and springy texture. Young Gouda cheese often has a smooth, creamy texture and a pale ivory to light yellow colour. Over time, the cheese's appearance changes into a richer golden hue, and its texture becomes more crumbly and firm. Gouda cheese obtains a harder, crystalline appearance as it ages, where small crystals may be visible.

== Protection ==
The term "Gouda" is not restricted to cheese of Dutch origin. However, "Boerenkaas", "Noord-Hollandse Gouda", and "Gouda Holland" are protected geographical indications in the European Union (EU). These cheeses can only be made in the Netherlands (although not only in the Dutch province of South Holland, in which Gouda is situated) and can only use milk produced by Dutch cows.

== See also ==
- List of cheeses
- List of Dutch cheeses
- List of smoked foods
