= Kue satu =

Indonesian traditional cake

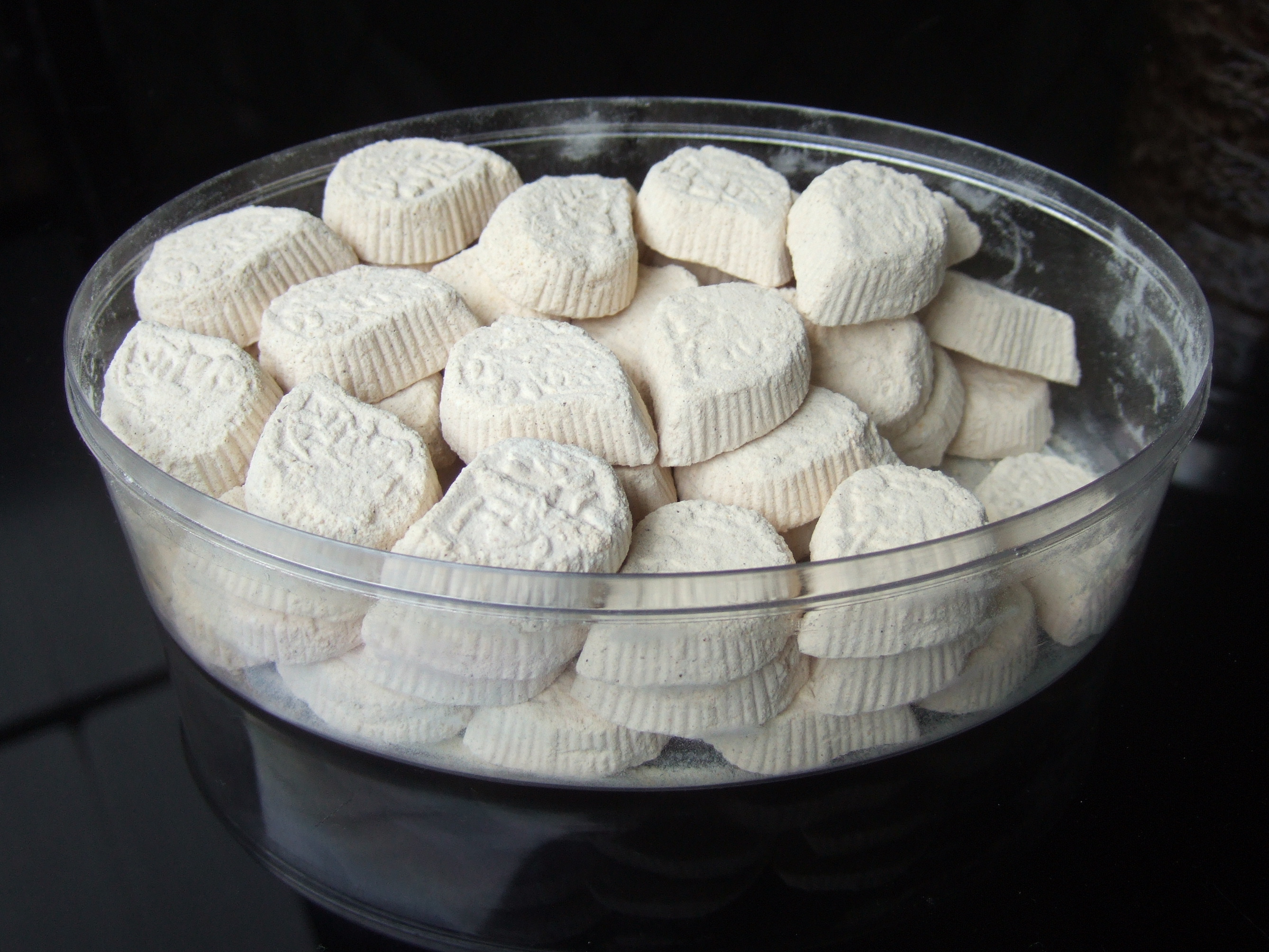
- White-colored kue satu
- Alternative names: Kue koya
- Type: Kue kering (traditional cookie)
- Course: Snack
- Place of origin: Indonesia
- Region or state: Java
- Serving temperature: Room temperature
- Main ingredients: Mung beans, powdered sugar, vanilla essence
- Variations: kue koya kacang tanah (peanut)

Kue satu (in West Java and Jakarta) or kue koya (in Central and East Java) is a popular traditional kue kering (dry traditional cookie) made of sweet white-colored mung bean powder that crumbles when bitten. It is commonly found as a traditional cookie in Indonesia, especially in Java. In Indonesia, this cookie is often served during festive occasions, such as Lebaran (Eid al Fitr), Natal (Christmas), and Imlek (Chinese new year). It is believed that the cookies were derived from Chinese Peranakan traditional cookies or dry kue.

== Ingredients and cooking method ==
Kue satu or kue koya are made with only four ingredients; mung beans, powdered sugar, vanilla extract, and water. The mung beans are dry-toasted until their skins start to crack, after which the skins are removed. The peeled mung beans are then mashed or ground manually with either a mortar and pestle, or more modern kitchen devices, like a food processor or blender. Then, the powdered mung beans are mixed with powdered sugar, vanilla extract, and a small amount of water to form a dough. This dough is then placed into small cookie molds and baked in the oven at 150°C. Afterwards, the baked cookies are aired and sun-dried for several hours, before being stored in air-tight glasses or plastic cookie jars.

== Variants ==
The most common kue koya variant uses mung beans, which give the powder a white color. Another variant is called kue koya kacang tanah, which uses ground peanuts instead of mung beans, thus creating a brown-colored kue koya.

== See also ==
- Kue bangkit
- Kaasstengels
- Bakpia
- List of cookies
