= Edam cheese =

Semi-hard Dutch cheese

Edam edammer (Dutch)
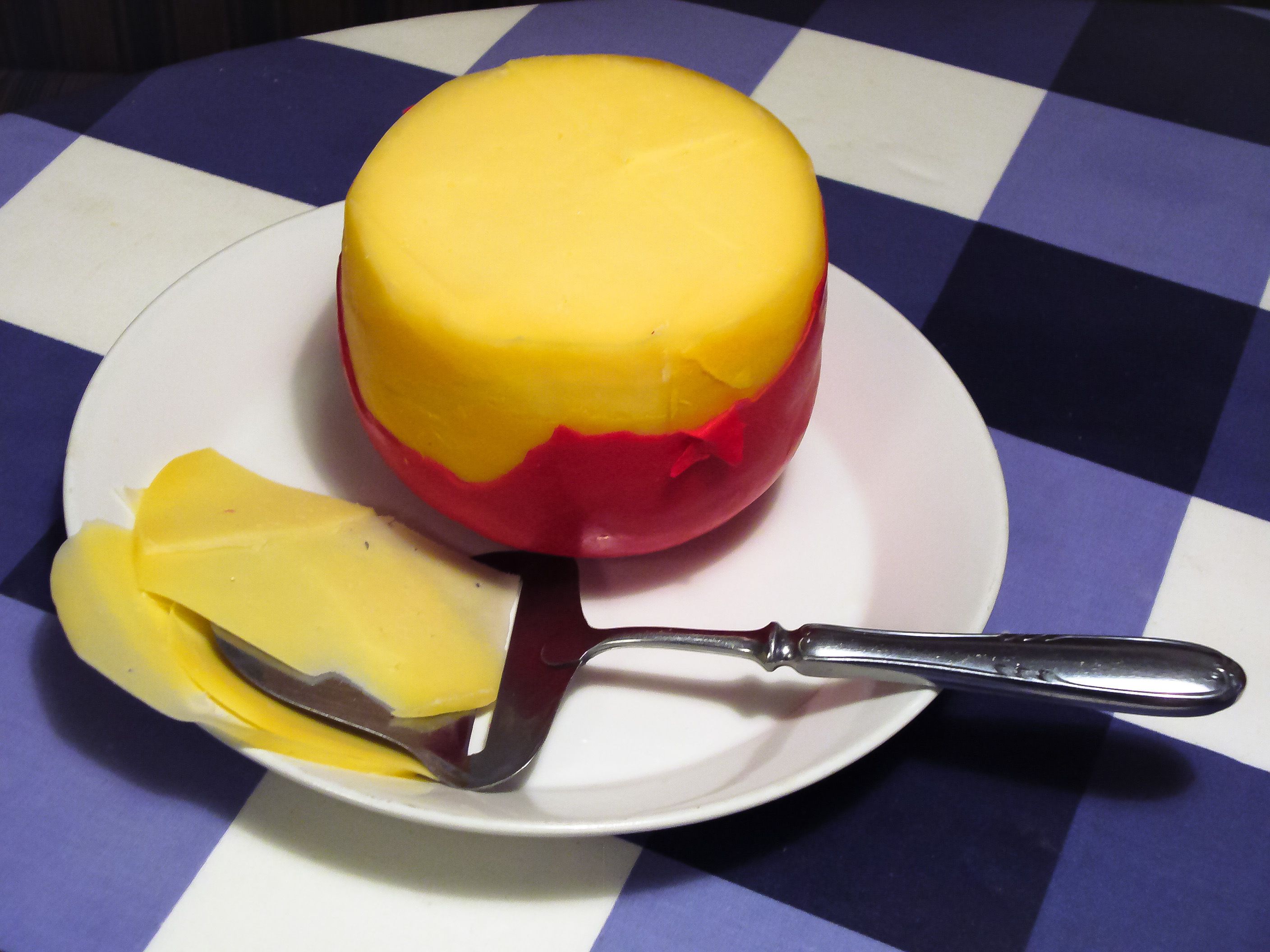
- Country of origin: Netherlands
- Region: Edam-Volendam
- Town: Edam
- Source of milk: Cows
- Pasteurised: Yes
- Texture: Semi-hard
- Fat content: 11g/100g
- Aging time: 4 weeks – 10 months
- Certification: Yes
- Named after: Edam

Edam (Dutch: edammer [eːˈdɑmər]) is a semi-hard cheese that originated in the Netherlands, and is named after the town of Edam in the province of North Holland. Edam is traditionally sold in flat-ended spheres with a pale yellow interior and a coat, or rind, of red paraffin wax. Edam ages and travels well and hardens, instead of spoiling, for an extended period. These qualities (among others) made it the world's most popular cheese between the 14th and 18th centuries, both at sea and in remote colonies.

== Content ==
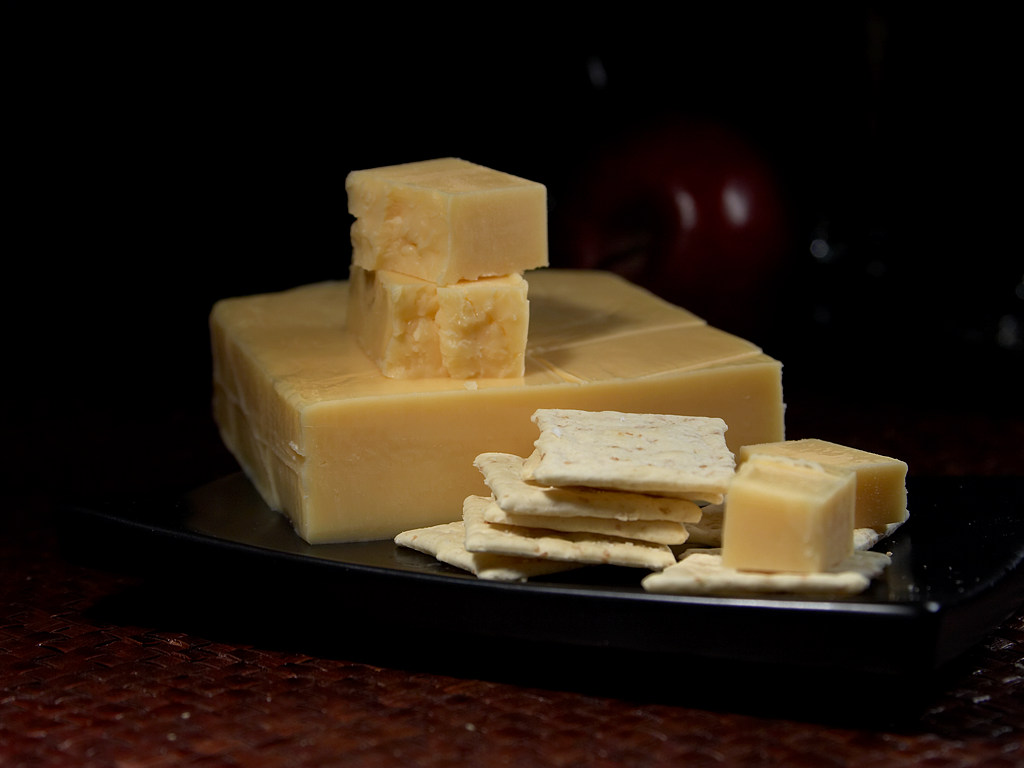
Edammer cheese with crackers

Most "young" Edam cheeses sold in stores have a very mild flavour, slightly salty or nutty, and almost no smell when compared to other cheeses. As the cheese ages, its flavour sharpens, and it becomes firmer. Edam may have as little as 28% fat in dry matter. Modern Edam is softer than other cheeses, such as cheddar cheese, because of its low fat content.

== Accompaniments ==
Mild Edam goes well with fruit such as peaches, melons, apricots, and cherries. Aged Edam is often eaten with traditional "cheese fruits" like pears and apples. Like most cheeses, it is commonly eaten on crackers and bread, and may be eaten with crackers following the main course of a meal as a dessert of "cheese and biscuits". Pinot gris, dry Riesling, semidry Riesling, sparkling wine, Chardonnay, and Shiraz/Syrah are some recommended wines to accompany this cheese.

== Regional uses ==
=== Spain and former colonies ===
In Spain and some of its former colonies, such as the Philippines and many Latin American countries, the cheese is known as queso de bola (ball cheese) and was long considered a delicacy.

In the Mexican state of Yucatán, queso de bola is prepared as queso relleno ("stuffed cheese"). A ball of cheese is cut in half and carved out; it is then stuffed with a mixture of seasoned ground meat, raisins, capers, and olives. Finally, it is braised in chicken stock, and served sliced with the chicken stock that has been thickened with cornstarch and spiced tomato sauce.

=== Czechia and Slovakia ===
Edam is the most common cheese used in the Czech Republic, where it is usually sold under the name eidam. It is often used as the base of the snack smažený sýr ("fried cheese"), which is popular in the country and also in neighbouring Slovakia (Slovak: vyprážaný syr) where it may be served with a slice of ham (Slovak: so šunkou), and always with tartar sauce (tatarská omáčka) or mayonnaise.

=== Belize ===
In Belize, where it was once one of the few commercially available cheeses, it may also be known as queso de calavera, queso de colorado, or dutch cheese and usually eaten when well-aged and sharp, commonly with bread and coffee.

=== Indonesia ===
In Indonesia, Edam cheese is quite popular—due to historical ties with the Netherlands—and is known as keju edam. Generally, it is Edam cheese that is used for cooking kaasstengels, a snack that is served during Eid ul-Fitr, Christmas, and Chinese New Year. Other Indonesian dishes such as roti bakar, kue cubit and pannenkoek can be served with Edam cheese as a topping.

=== Philippines ===
In the Philippines, queso de bola (sometimes spelled keso de bola) is popular during Christmas in the Philippines, when Filipinos feast with family and friends. It is customarily served with jamón and pandesal during the Noche Buena, the traditional feast taken around midnight of Christmas Eve and lasting until the early hours of Christmas Day.

=== Scandinavia ===
The cheese is also associated with Christmas in Sweden and Norway due to its red color, and is often found on the Christmas Julbord buffet.

== In popular culture ==
Edam has been treated dramatically and humorously in a variety of cultural art forms. In the novel All Quiet on the Western Front, the main character believes its red outer covering is a sign of impending death. It is a wine aroma nuance in Sideways and an object of desire in the animated film Shopper 13. Edam is a seriocomic pivot in the Australian film Three Dollars. Actor Jason Flemyng advertised Edam in the UK. Edam was tested by MythBusters in episode 128 for its putative suitability as cannon ammunition against a ship's sail, but it bounced off the sail without damaging it.

In Season 2 episode 24 of Whose Line Is It Anyway?, Colin Mochrie playing "Cheese Man" claims he doesn't "give edam", a cheese pun. Drew Carey then describes it as "crossword puzzle cheese". ("Dutch cheese that's made backwards" is a well known clue for Edam in cryptic crosswords.)

== See also ==
- List of cheeses
- Babybel
- Molbo
