= Black and white cookie =

Round cookie with chocolate and vanilla frosting

Half-moon cookie
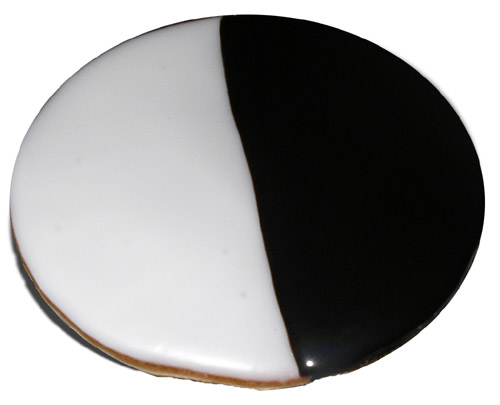
- Alternative names: Half-and-half cookie
- Type: Cookie
- Course: Snack or dessert

Black-and-white cookies, half-and-half cookies, and half-moon cookies are round cookies iced or frosted in two colors, with one half vanilla and the other chocolate. They are found in the Northeastern United States and Florida. Black-and-white cookies are flat, have fondant or sometimes royal icing on a dense cake base, and are common in the New York metropolitan area. Half-moon cookies are slightly dome-shaped (convex), have frosting on a fluffy angel cake base, and are common in Central New York and Boston, Massachusetts.

The Amerikaner is a similar cookie in German baking.

== History ==
Designs with contrasting light and dark parts were popular at the beginning of the 20th century, including on baked goods and desserts. Cookies with cake bases also became popular at the time. Culinary historian Stephen Schmidt, author of Master Recipes, sees black-and-whites and half-moons as straightforward convergences of the two trends, and compares them to teacakes served in the Southern United States.

=== Black-and-white cookies ===
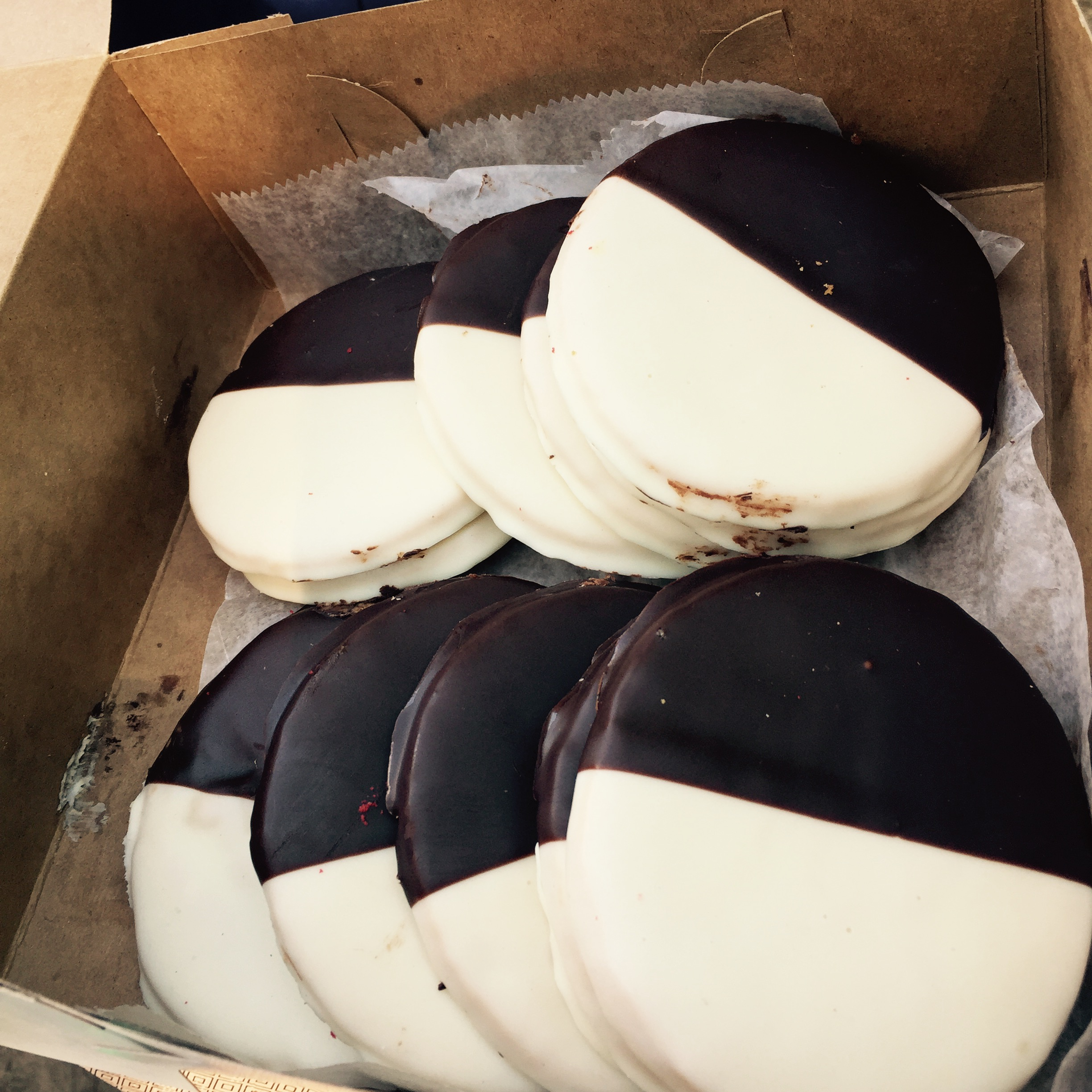
Box of black-and-white cookies from a New York City bakery

The black-and-white cookie is commonly traced to Glaser's Bake Shop in the Yorkville neighborhood of Manhattan, founded in 1902 by Jewish Bavarian immigrants, John and Justine Glaser. (Note: Not to be confused with the village of Yorkville near Utica in Central New York.) The black-and-white cookie was among the original recipes used by Glaser's Bake Shop.

By the post-war period, black-and-white cookies had become part of American Ashkenazi Jewish culinary repertoire, deeply rooted in the Jewish communities of New York City and elsewhere around the United States. The cookies are a fixture at many Metro New York Jewish bakeries, including Moishe's Bake Shop and William Greenberg's Desserts.

In Italian-American bakeries in New York City, a thin layer of apricot jam is sometimes present below the fondant.

=== Half-moon cookies ===
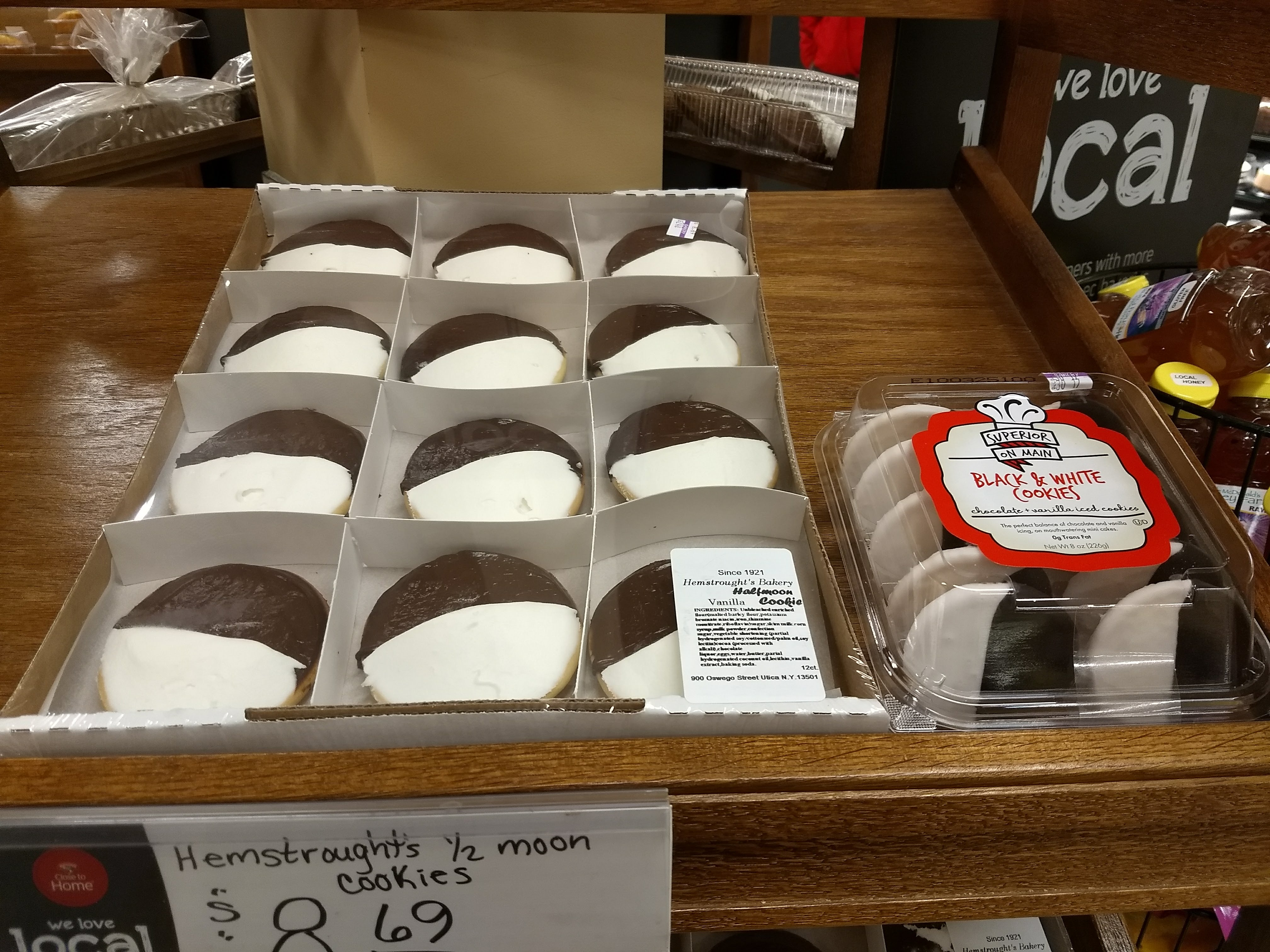
Half-moon cookies and black-and-white cookies in a grocery store in New Hartford, New York (near Utica). The half-moon cookies are significantly larger.

Half-moon cookies can be traced to Hemstrought's Bakery in Utica, New York, who started baking half-moons around 1925. (Note: Hemstrought's began business in 1920, but does not appear to have baked half-moon cookies before 1925.) Half moons are still very popular in Utica, and local media often debates which bakery makes the best half-moons.

Half-moons are often frosted higher on one side than the other. In Boston, sometimes the domed side is frosted rather than the flat side.

=== Amerikaners ===
The Amerikaner is often decorated like the black and white cookie, but can be frosted entirely in vanilla instead. The origin and name of Amerikaner in Germany is unclear, as is their possible relationship to black-and-white cookies. It is sometimes claimed that the cookie was introduced or reintroduced by American GIs serving at US military bases in Germany during the 1950s. Another theory proposes a corruption of the word Ammoniumhydrogencarbonat (ammonium bicarbonate, a leavening agent). In the former East Germany, due to anti-Americanism, the name Ammonplätzchen (Ammonia cookies) was used.

== As a racial metaphor ==
In the 1994 Seinfeld episode "The Dinner Party", Jerry eats a black-and-white cookie while waiting in a New York City bakery with Elaine. He uses the cookie as a metaphor for racial harmony, saying the chocolate and vanilla represent black and white people living together. If the colors mix together well on a cookie, Jerry argues, so can different races in society, suggesting the answer to poor race relations is to "Look to the cookie!" While campaigning in the 2008 United States presidential election at a deli in Hollywood, Florida, Barack Obama bought two black-and-white cookies and said about them, "it's a unity cookie." In a 2015 op-ed in Tablet magazine, African-American Rabbi Shais Rishon argued that the cookie, with its cleanly separated black and white sides, better represented racial segregation.

== See also ==
- Cuisine of New York City
- List of shortbread biscuits and cookies
- Neenish tart
- Roze koek
- Utica, New York § Culture
