= Vanillekipferl =

Crescent shaped cookies

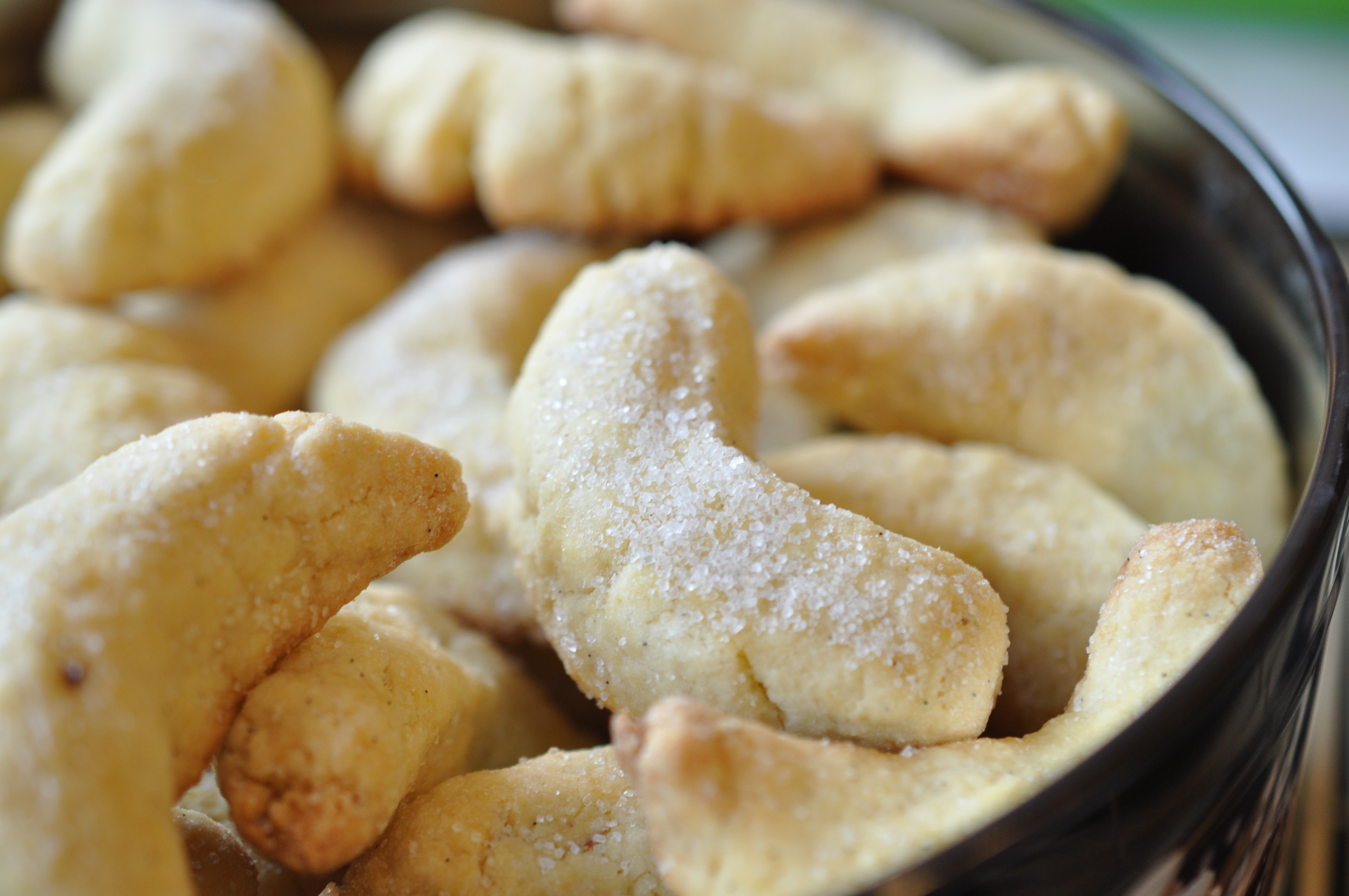
- Type: Biscuit
- Place of origin: Austria and Holy Roman Empire
- Region or state: Vienna
- Serving temperature: room temperature
- Main ingredients: Almonds or walnuts, butter, flour, powdered sugar, vanilla or vanillin

Vanillekipferl are Austrian, German, Swiss, Czech, Slovak and Hungarian small, crescent-shaped biscuits. They were originally made with walnuts, but almonds or hazelnuts can also be used. They get their typical flavour from a heavy dusting of vanilla sugar.

== Origins ==
Vanillekipferl originate from Vienna in Austria and are traditionally made at Christmas. They are very well known in Europe and are often for sale in Viennese coffee shops and bakeries, especially during Christmas time. They are said to have been created in the shape of the Turkish crescent moon symbolizing the celebration of the victory over the Ottoman Turks in 1683 at the Battle of Vienna.

They are also widely baked in Germany, Austria, Switzerland, Czech Republic, Slovakia, Hungary, and among the Danube Swabian diaspora as a part of the typical Christmas baking. Since Advent in Germany is celebrated by several denominations of Christianity on the four Sundays preceding Christmas, many kinds of biscuits and sweets are consumed during this time and have become typical for winter.

Unlike other pastries, this particular kind is difficult to bake. The raw dough is very soft because it contains a high amount of butter and it must be shaped quickly with cool hands. After baking, the Kipferl are very fragile and the baker must be very cautious when rolling them in the sugar and vanilla mixture while they are still hot from the oven.

== See also ==
- Austrian cuisine
- Hungarian cuisine
- Kifli
- Croissant
- Cronut
- Kue putri salju
- List of almond dishes
