= Kue bangkit =

Southeast Asian tapioca cookies

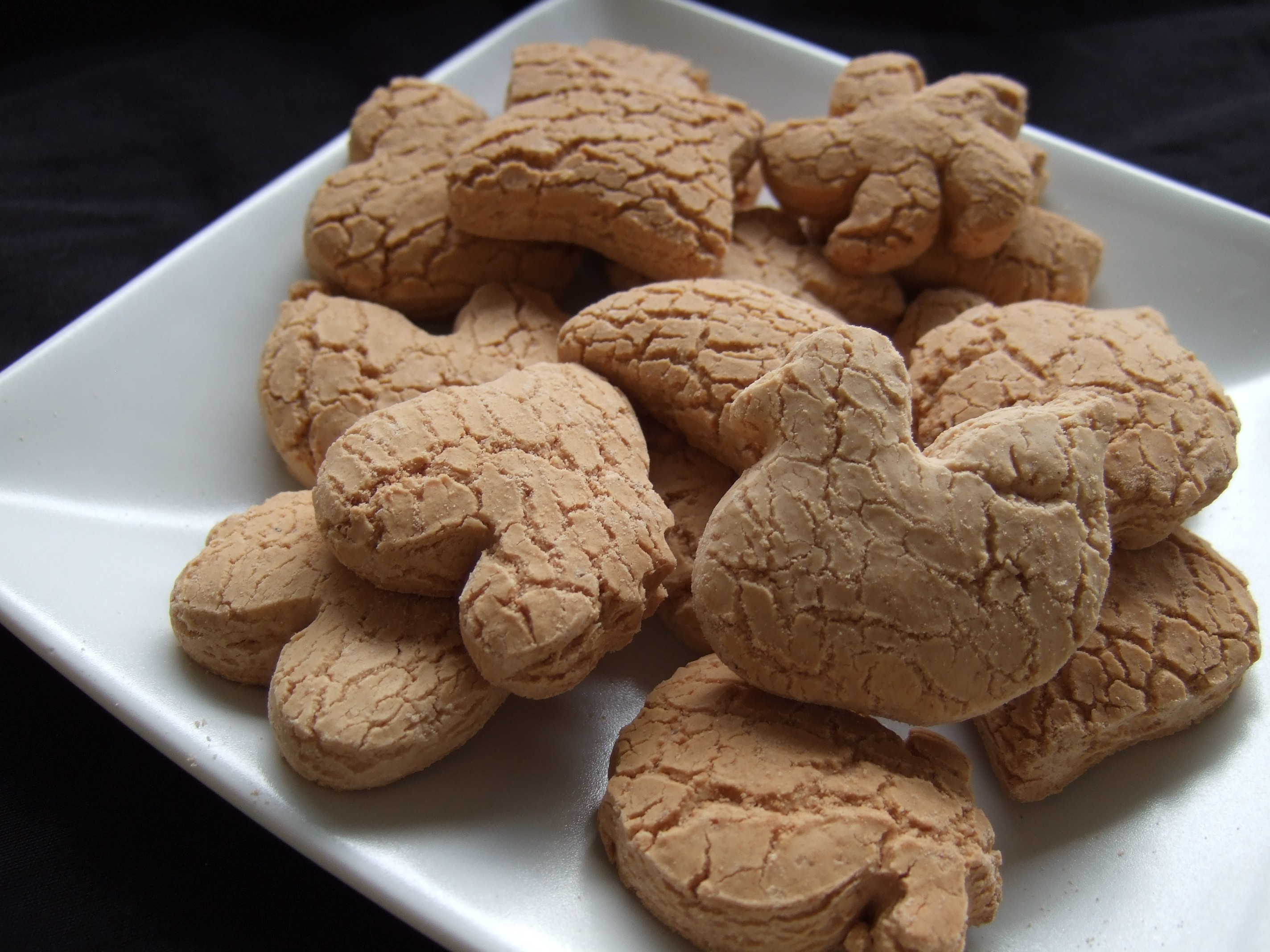
- Kue bangkit, "rising" sago cookie
- Alternative names: Kuih bangkit
- Type: Cookie
- Course: Snack, dessert
- Place of origin: Indonesia, Malaysia and Singapore
- Region or state: Southeast Asia (Brunei, Indonesia, Malaysia and Singapore)
- Main ingredients: Sago or tapioca starch, coconut milk, egg

Kue bangkit is a small biscuit (kue or kuih) in Malay cuisine made from sago starch, commonly found amongst the Malay communities in Brunei, Indonesia, Malaysia and Singapore. The biscuit is found in various colours, ranging from white to yellowish to brown, depending on the additional ingredients.

In Indonesia, kue bangkit is associated with the Malay community of Riau and Riau Islands provinces, while in Brunei, Malaysia and Singapore, kuih bangkit is associated with both the Malay and Chinese communities. It is one of the typical traditional cookies often consumed during Hari Raya and Chinese New Year.

The biscuit is also consumed in other countries under different names; in Thailand (especially Southern Thailand), it is known as khanom ping while in Vietnam, these tapioca cookies are known as banh phuc linh. These cookies are commonly served during the Lunar New Year in these countries.

== Etymology ==
The coconut sago cookie is called kue bangkit in Indonesia, and kuih/kueh bangkit in Malaysia and Singapore. The term bangkit in Malay means 'rise', referring to the fact that the biscuit expands to twice the size after baking.

== Ingredients ==
Kue bangkit ingredients consist of sago or tapioca starch, thick coconut milk, sugar, egg yolks, pandan leaf, margarine and salt. Sometimes vanilla extract and gula aren (palm sugar) might be used for a better aroma.

The texture of the biscuit is very crispy and tends to be brittle. The dough is molded using small cookie molds, and subsequently the cookies being baked using oven. Eating this cake will give the sensation of melting in the mouth. However, the texture remains crispy when chewed. Kue bangkit has a sweet and savory flavour.

== Variations ==
In Singapore, McDonald's outlets released desserts inspired by the biscuit's taste, including kueh bangkit-flavoured McFlurry, sundae, and soft serve.

== See also ==
- Kue satu
- Kue lidah kucing
- Kue
- List of cookies
- List of Indonesian dishes
- List of Indonesian snacks
- Malaysian cuisine
- Meringue
