= Neenish tart =

Australian pastry with colorful icing

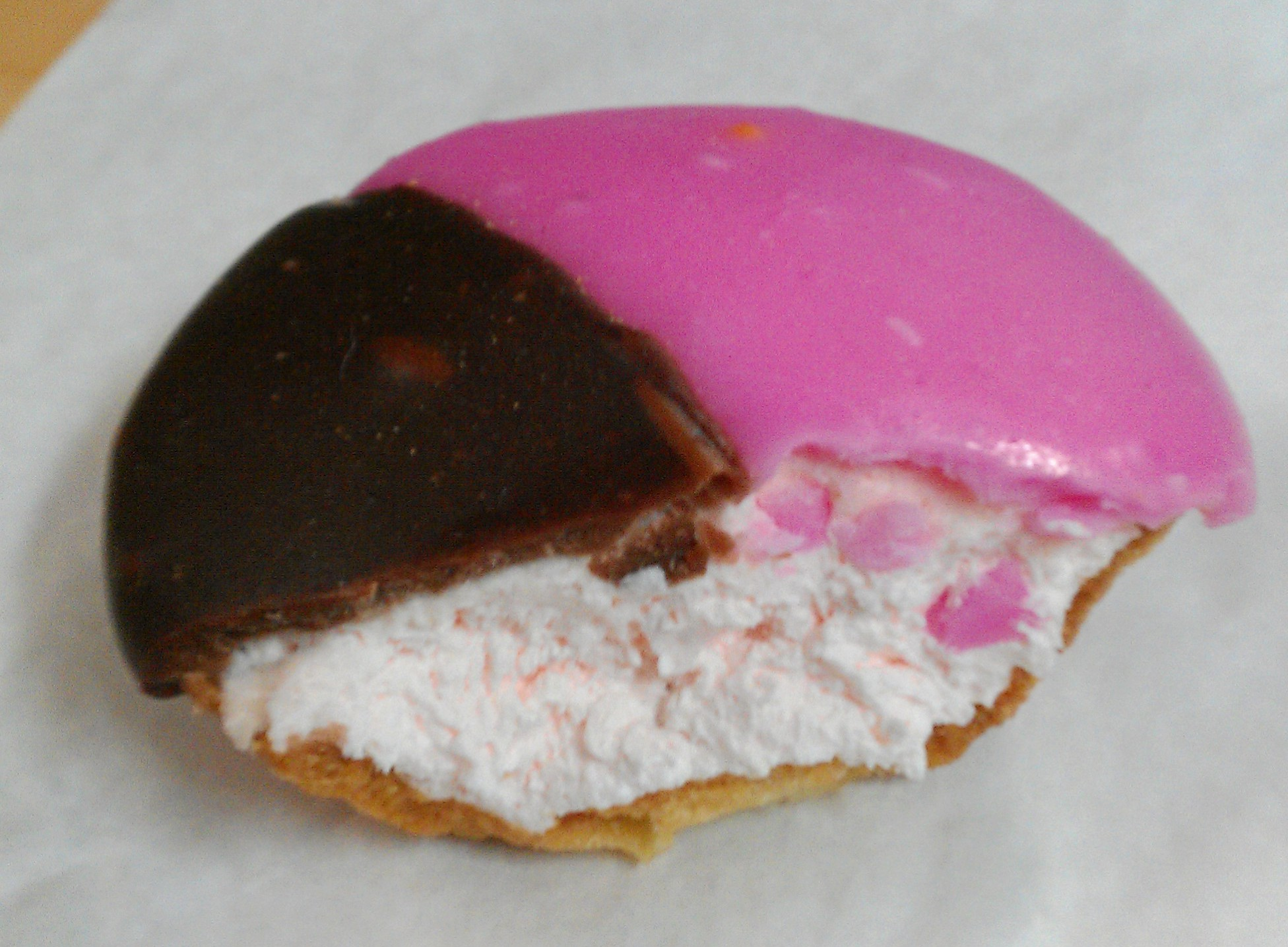
- A neenish tart with a bite taken out of it
- Alternative names: Nienich, nenische
- Type: Tart
- Place of origin: Australia
- Main ingredients: Pastry base, sweet gelatine-set cream, butter cream, or icing sugar

A neenish tart (or neenish cake) is a tart made with a pastry base and a filling consisting of sweet gelatine-set cream, mock cream, icing sugar paste, or lemon and sweetened condensed milk mixture, with dried icing on the top of the tart in two colours. The addition of a layer of raspberry jam is a common recipe variation. The colours used for the icing are usually some combination of brown, white, and pink. They are almost exclusively sized as individual servings, 60–80 mm in diameter. The tart was originally created in Australia and is mainly found there, alongside New Zealand and the Falkland Islands.

In Australia the term pineapple tart often refers to a variation on the neenish tart, with pineapple jam below the filling, and passionfruit icing.

== History ==
The origin of the name "neenish" is unknown. A column in the Sydney Morning Herald attributed the name to a woman named Ruby Neenish, but this was later revealed to be a prank. Alternative names such as nenische (recorded in 1929) and nienich (recorded in 1935) suggest a German origin, although neenish was known before the alternatives, suggesting these names were to give a "continental" flavour to the tart.

"Nenish cakes" appear in Sydney newspaper advertisements as early as 1895, and a reference to neenish tarts is found in a recipe in the Sydney Mail in November 1901. A recipe published in Launceston's Daily Telegraph in January 1903 is very similar. Both recipes used an almond-based pastry and a filling comprising a "very thick custard of eggs and milk thickened with cornflour". The top of the tart consisted of coffee and vanilla icing in equal halves. Another early printed recipe was in Miss Drake's Home Cookery published in 1929, calling for cream filling set with gelatine and pink christabelle and white icing on top. A 1932 recipe in Miranda's Cook Book calls for custard filling and chocolate and white icing.

The lemon-flavoured version of the tart most familiar to New Zealand residents is found in the Edmonds Cookery Book. It includes a filling made from butter, icing sugar, sweetened condensed milk and lemon juice, set in a sweet short pastry crust and topped with half standard white icing and half chocolate (cocoa added) icing.

== See also ==
- Black and white cookie
