= Kaasstengels =

Dutch and Indonesian cheese cookie

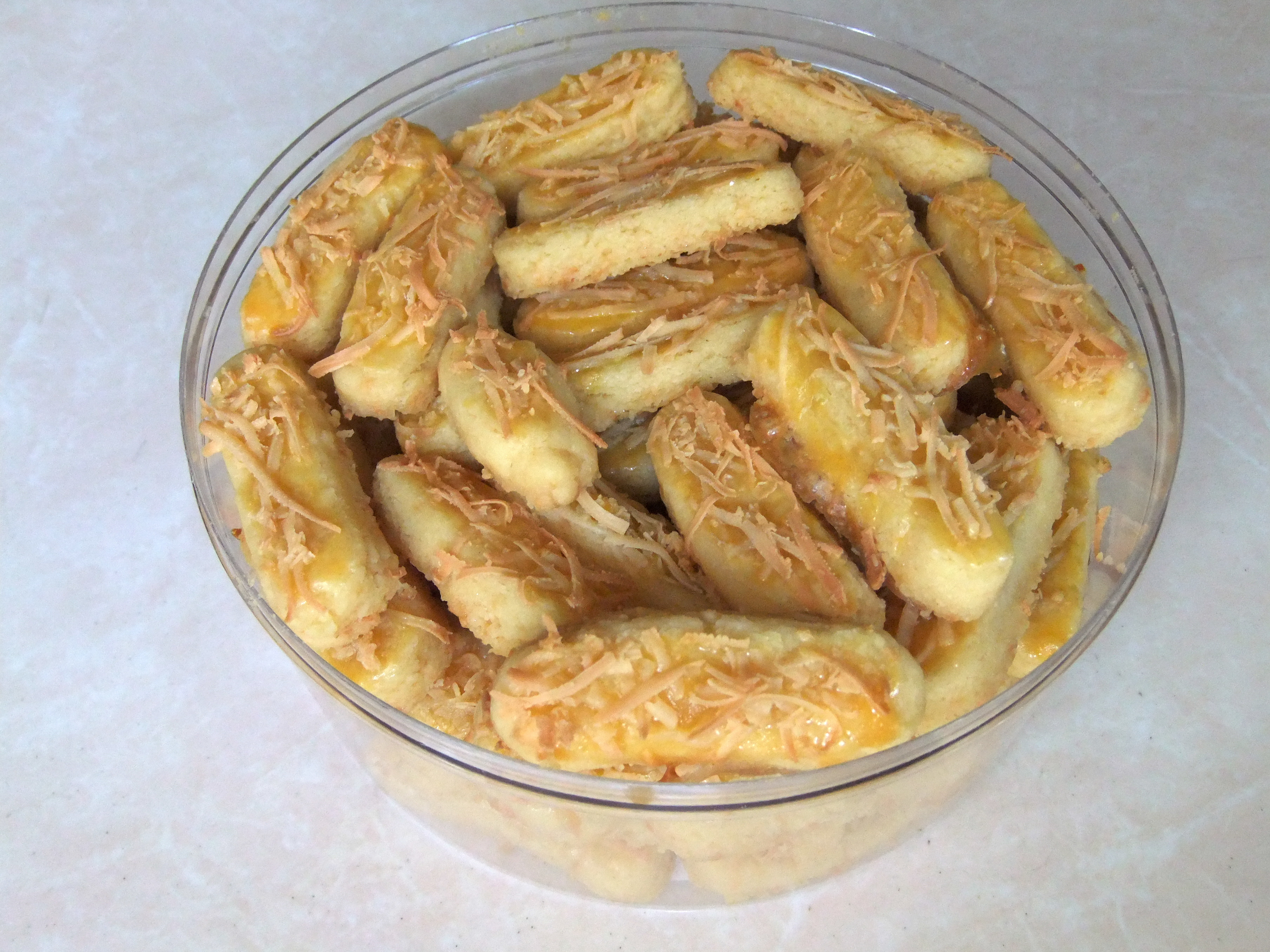
- Kaasstengels in Indonesia
- Type: Cookie
- Place of origin: Netherlands
- Associated cuisine: Netherlands and Indonesia
- Main ingredients: Flour, maizena, baking powder, egg yolks, butter or margarine, salt, sugar, cheddar cheese and or edam cheese
- Variations: Kastengel, kue keju (Indonesia)

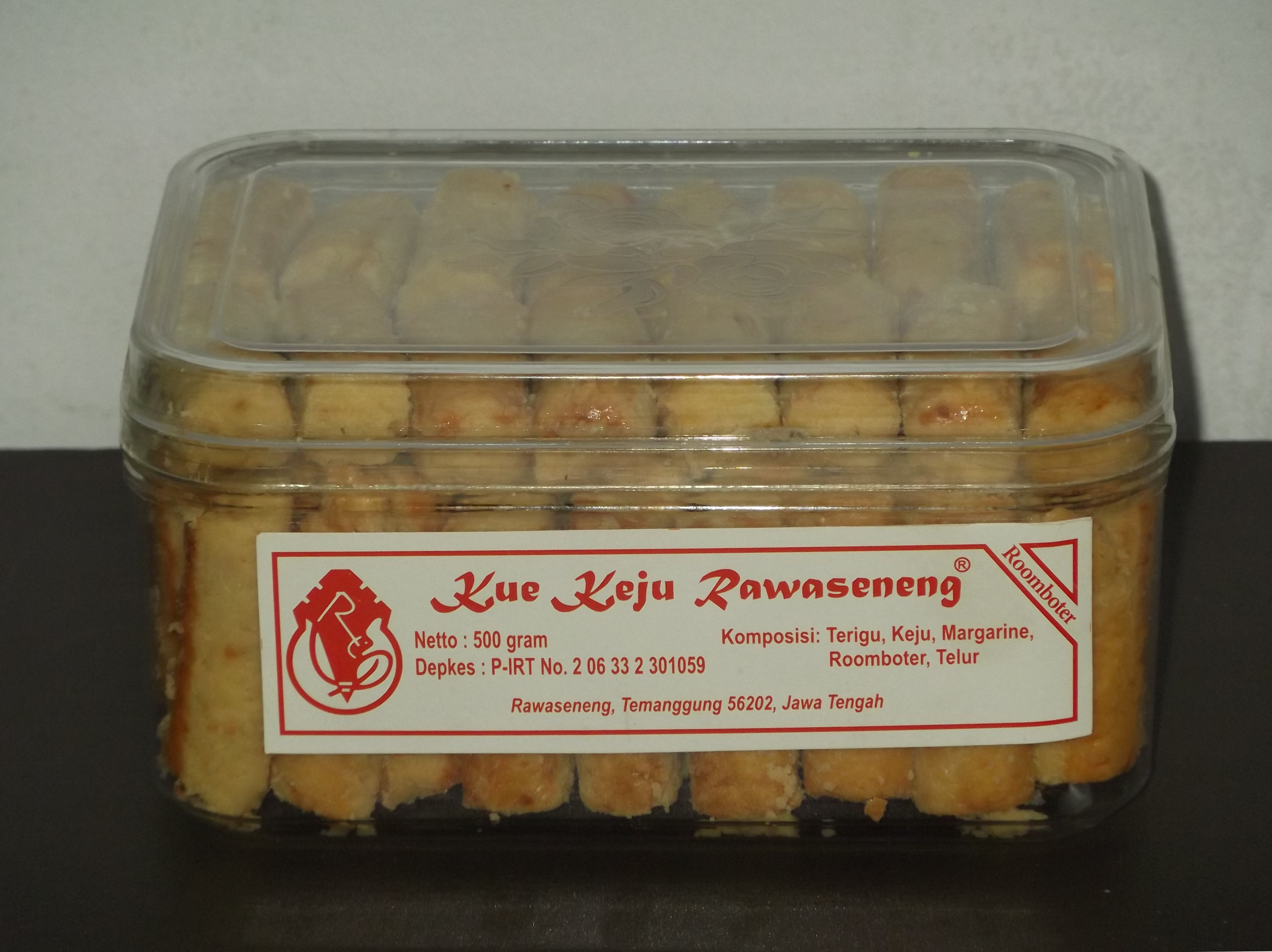
Kaasstengels made by the monks from the Rawaseneng Monastery in Kandangan, Temanggung.

Kaasstengels (//), Kastengel or kue keju are a Dutch cheese snack in the shape of sticks. Owing to its colonial links to the Netherlands, kaasstengels are also commonly found in Indonesia. The name refers to its ingredients, shape and origin; kaas is the Dutch word for "cheese", while stengels means "sticks". Unlike most cookies, kaasstengels taste savoury and salty instead of sweet.

In Indonesia kaasstengels, together with nastar and putri salju are the popular kue kering ("dried kue", or cookie), during festive occasions, such as Natal (Christmas) and Lebaran (Eid al Fitr). It is one of several Dutch delicacies that has been adopted into Indonesian cuisine since the colonial era.

== Recipe ==
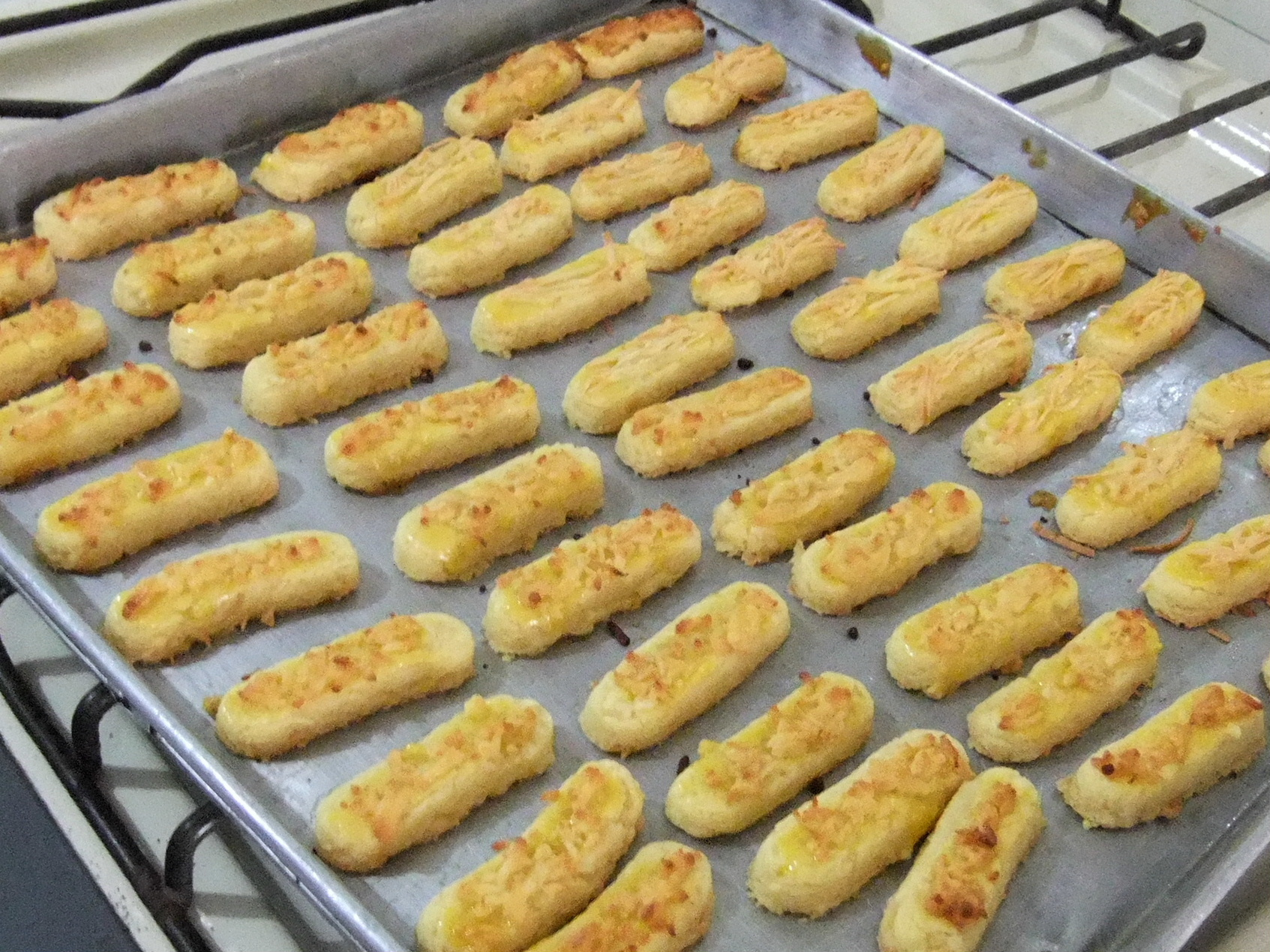
Freshly baked kaasstengels

Kaasstengels' dough is made of a fine mixture of butter or margarine with egg yolks, with addition of grated cheese, then mixed together with flour, cornstarch and baking powder. The kind of cheese being use might be edam, gouda or cheddar.

The dough is rolled into small rectangles, brushed with egg yolk, sprinkled with grated cheese, and then baked. Nutritional yeast can be used as a substitute for cheese to make it suitable for a vegan diet. These pieces of kaasstengels must be kept in an airtight container, e.g. tin, plastic or glass container, to maintain its freshness and crumbly texture.

== See also ==
- Nastar
- Klappertaart
- Spekkoek
- Poffertjes
- List of cookies
- Kue
