= Kue putri salju =

Indonesian traditional cake

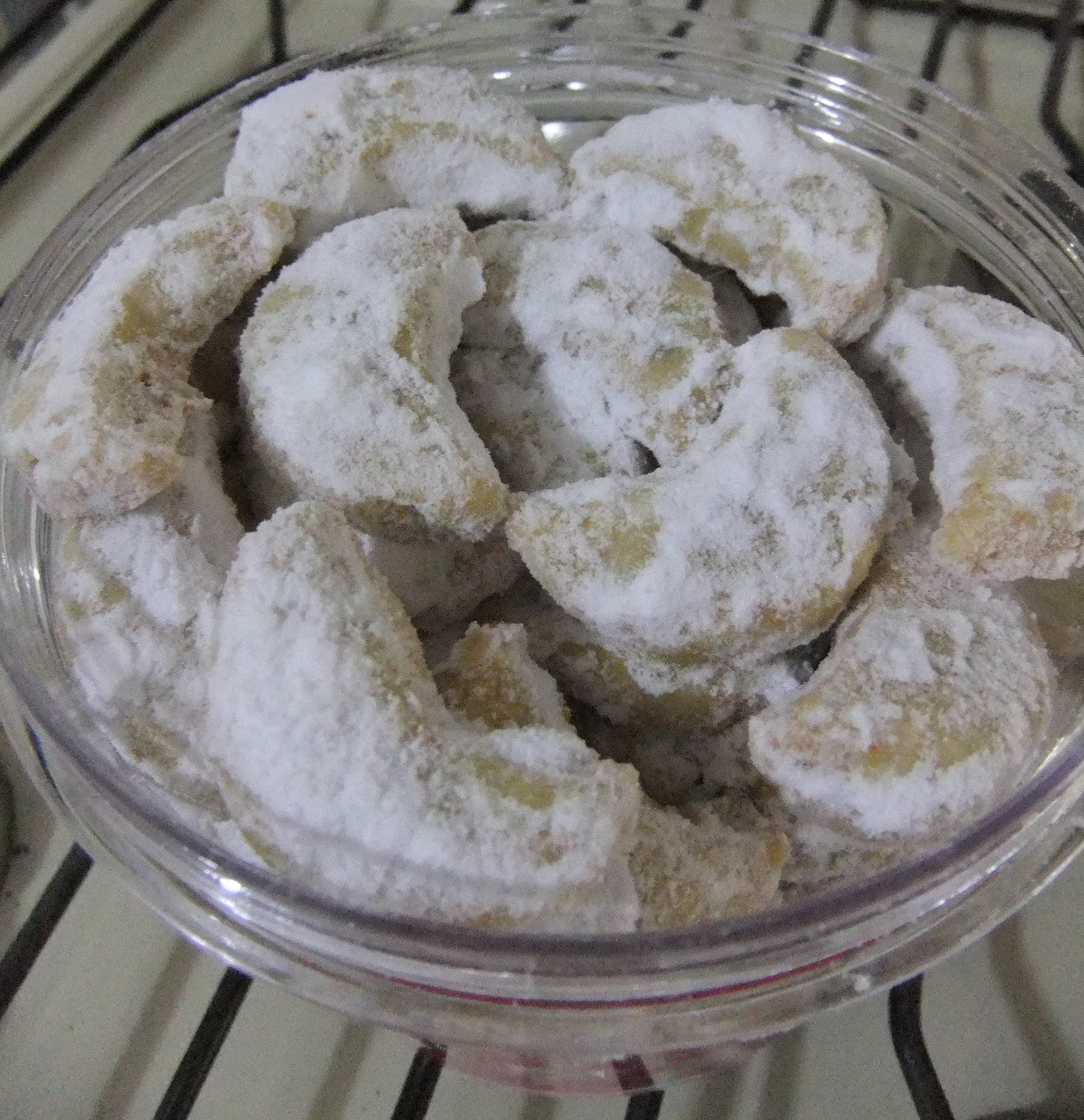
- White sugar-powdered putri salju
- Type: Kue kering (traditional cookie)
- Course: Snack, dessert
- Place of origin: Indonesia
- Region or state: Southeast Asia
- Associated cuisine: Indonesia
- Serving temperature: Room temperature
- Main ingredients: Flour, butter, egg yolks, powdered sugar
- Food energy (per serving): 62 (per 12.0 gr)

Putri salju (Indonesian: kue putri salju) is an Indonesian kue kering (dried kue or cookie) shaped like crescents and covered with powdered sugar. Putri salju is Indonesian for "snow princess", referring to the powdered sugar coating that resembles snow, and the sugar coating sometimes gives cooling sensation while eaten.

Putri salju is a typical delicacy for festive occasions and major holidays, such as Lebaran (Eid ul-Fitr), Natal (Christmas) and Imlek (Chinese New Year). Putri salju cookies are usually sold in air-tight plastic or glass jars in traditional markets, bakeries, pastry shops and supermarkets.

== Ingredients ==
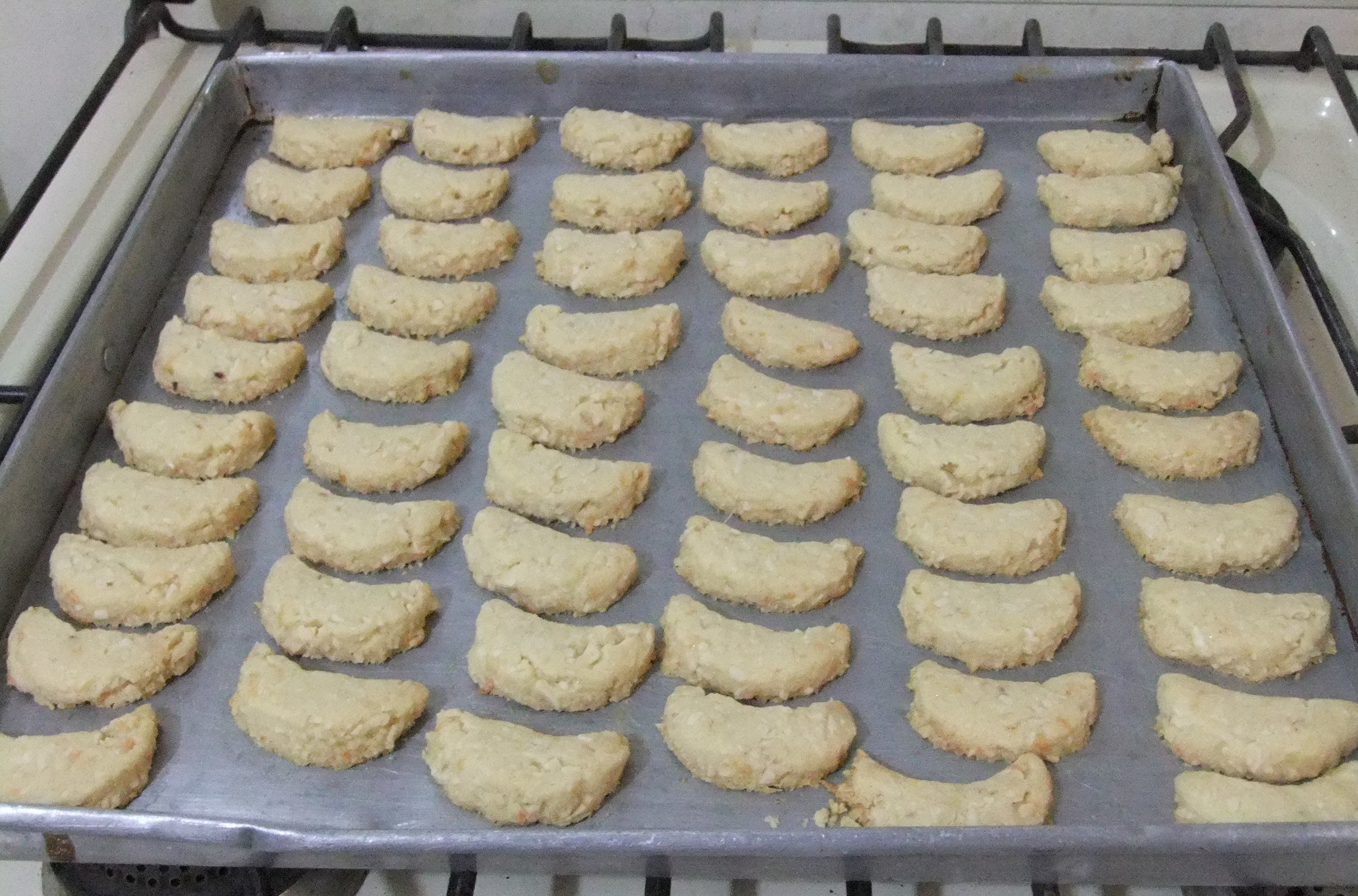
Baking putri salju cookies.

The cookies' dough is made from a fine mixture of flour, cornstarch, butter or margarine and egg yolks which is baked in the oven. After the cookies are ready, they are left to cool slowly to room temperature. Once cool, powdered sugar is either sprinkled upon the cookies, or both powdered sugar and cookies are placed in a plastic bag and shaken to distribute the sugar evenly on the cookies' surfaces. Prepared cookies must be stored in air-tight containers to prevent the sugar from absorbing water from the air via hygroscopy. This cookie is loved so much by the Indonesian people, especially children.

Today, while most are prepared in the typical fashion with sugar, several variants of kue putri salju are available, including cheese and chocolate. A version including pandan prepared with green food colouring is also popular.

== See also ==
- Kue
- Pineapple tart
- Kaastengels
- Vanillekipferl
