= Roze koek =

Dutch pastry

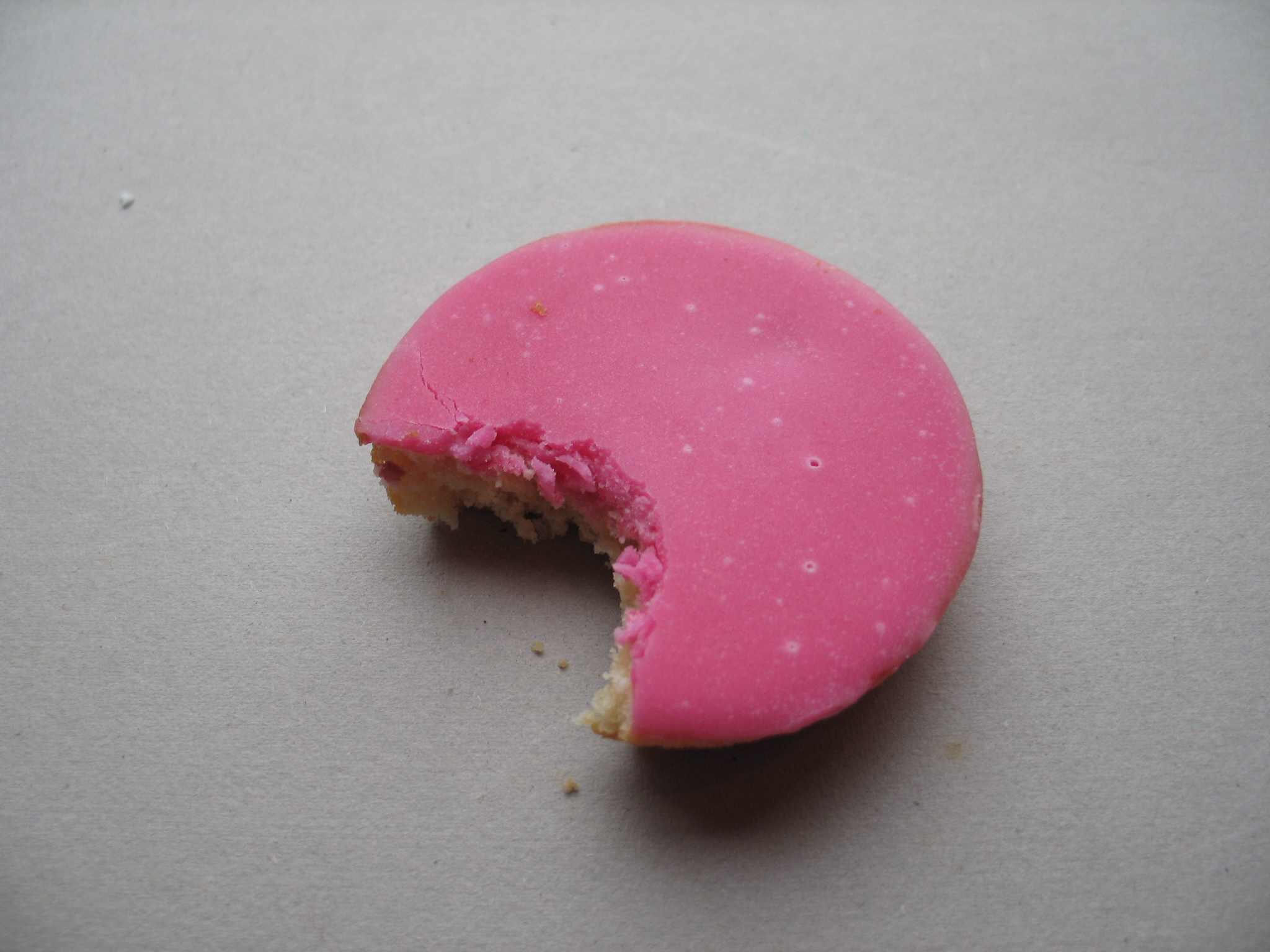
- A Glacé with a bite taken out
- Type: Pastry
- Place of origin: Netherlands
- Main ingredients: Cake, pink fondant

A roze koek ("pink cake") is a Dutch pastry. It consists of a round, flat, dense cake with a layer of pink fondant icing, similar to black and white cookies.

In the city of Amsterdam and in Belgium, the cakes are sometimes referred to as moesselientjes ("little Mussolinis"); this name, which is the Dutch adaptation of Benito Mussolini's name, is rooted in the cake's tradition of being sold in Italian ice-cream parlours in Amsterdam prior to the Second World War.

Roze koek is commonly sold at supermarket chains such as Albert heijn.

== Variants ==
On occasion the cakes are sold in alternative varieties, with the pink icing replaced by a different colour. During Koningsdag (the King's birthday) and major international football championships, the icing is changed to orange (the national colour of The Netherlands), and at Easter time, yellow cakes are sold.
