= Molbo cheese =

Danish cheese

Molbo
- Country of origin: Denmark
- Region: Mols
- Source of milk: cow
- Texture: semi-hard
- Fat content: 40%
- Weight: 1-2 kg

Molbo is a Danish cow's milk cheese made in the region of Mols. It is very similar to Edam, with a delicate, light flavour that is slightly tangy and salty. It has small, regular holes and, like Edam, is covered in a red wax coating. Made from cow milk, Molbo cheese is semi-hard in texture.

== See also ==
- List of cheeses
