= Master Recipes =

Cookbook by Stephen Schmidt

Master Recipes is a cookbook written by American author Stephen Schmidt. The book aims to put forth a method to teach cooking from basic principles, using strightforward and deliberate language and techniques. Recipes are provided in a basic form (the "master recipe"), and variations are later provided. First published in 1987 by Fawcett Columbine, the book received critical success, being placed on the Chicago Tribune's top 10 list of cookbooks for 1987, but had little public demand and fell out of print. An updated second edition was published in 1998 by Clear Light.

Schmidt has stated that the book took 6 years to produce. Following its initial publication, he directed a workshop on "How to Get a Cookbook Published", and has since written for the newsletter of the Culinary Historians of New York. He has also been an advisor on culinary history to the New York Academy of Medicine.
