= Pineapple tart =

Asian small pastries filled with pineapple jam

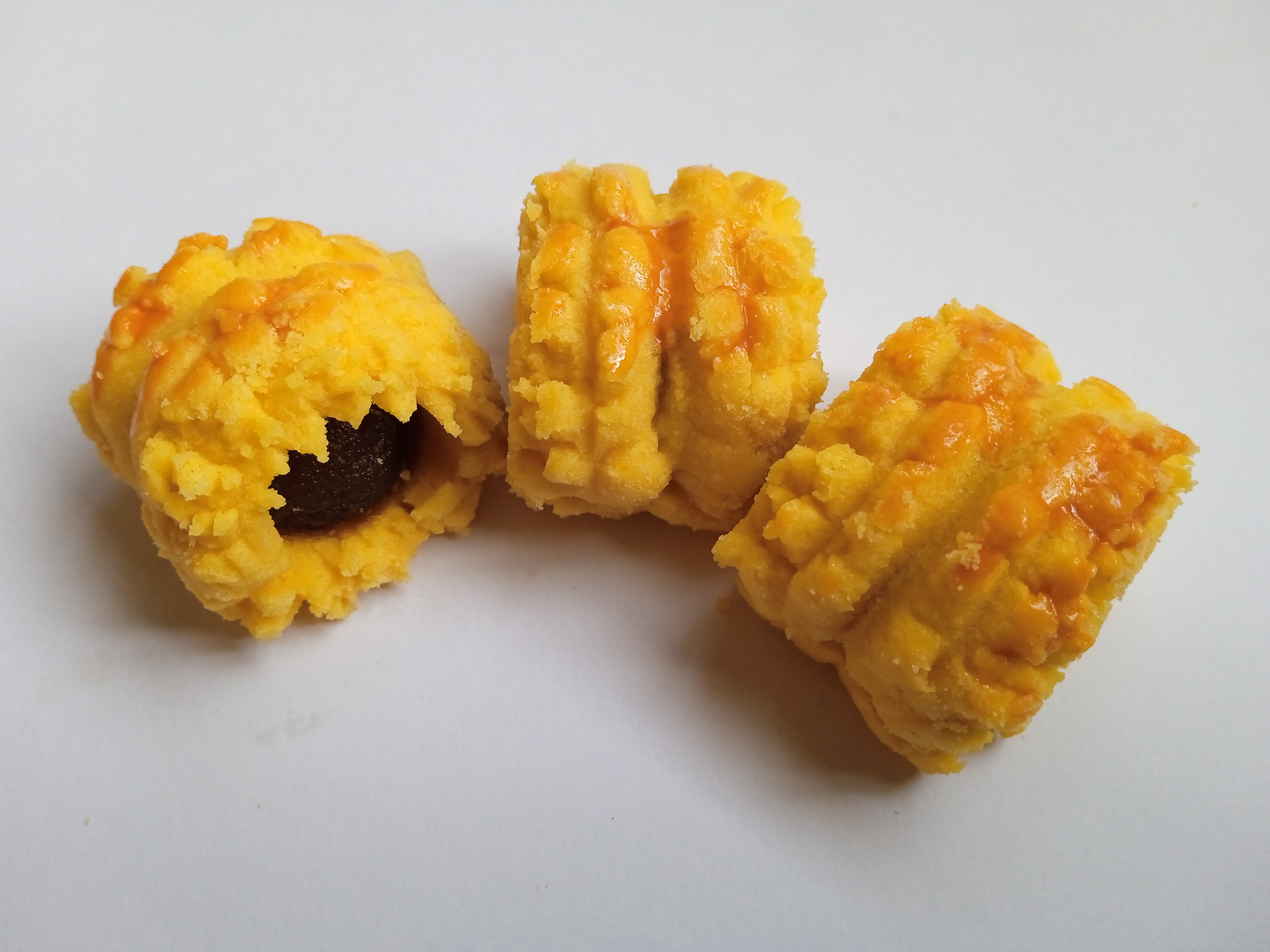
- Pineapple tarts in the shape of rolls open at the ends and filled with jam
- Alternative names: tat nanas, kueh tae, kue nanas
- Type: Tart
- Course: Dessert
- Region or state: Maritime Southeast Asia and East Asia
- Associated cuisine: Indonesia, Malaysia, Singapore, Brunei
- Main ingredients: Pastry (butter, egg yolk, corn starch), pineapple jam

Pineapple tart is a small, bite-size tart filled or topped with pineapple jam, commonly found throughout different parts of Southeast Asia such as Malaysia (Baba Malay: kueh tae or kuih tair; Malay language: kuih tat nanas, Jawi: تت نانس), Indonesia (kue nastar), Brunei and Singapore in various forms.

The pineapple tart may have been invented in the 16th century by the Peranakan people living in Malacca. This is around the time the pineapple, a fruit native to South America, was introduced to Asia and the Malay Peninsula by Portuguese merchants.

== General description ==
The pastry consists of a large proportion of butter and egg yolk, and some corn starch, giving it a rich, buttery, tender and melt-in-the-mouth texture. The pineapple jam is usually made through a slow reduction of grated fresh pineapple that is caramelized with a mix of sugar and spices, usually cinnamon, star anise and cloves.

Typical shapes include a flat, open tart topped with pineapple jam under a lattice of pastry, rolls filled with jam that are open at the ends, and jam-filled spheres or elongated shapes.

== Regions ==
=== Indonesia ===
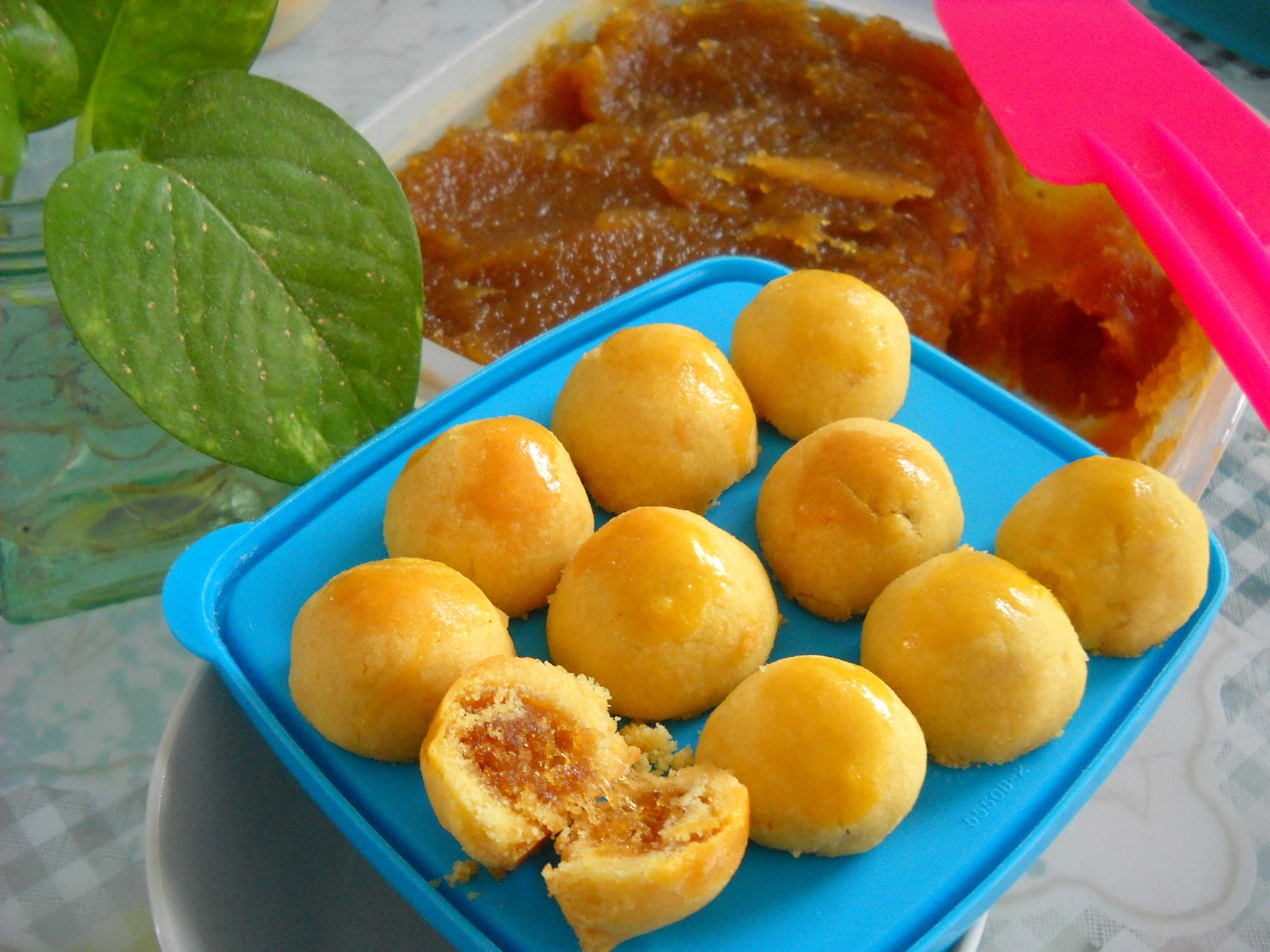
Kue nastar, sphere cookies with pineapple jam inside

In Indonesia, it is called nastar which is contraction of nanas tart (Ananas or pineapple tart), is a popular cookie or kue kering during festive occasions of Lebaran, Natal and Imlek. Just like many of Indonesian kue kering (cookies), its origin comes from the Dutch influence on Indonesian pastry, cake and cookies tradition. Most nastar is made as a round shape with a diameter of about 2 cm. The pineapple jam is filled inside instead of spread on top.

=== Malaysia and Singapore ===
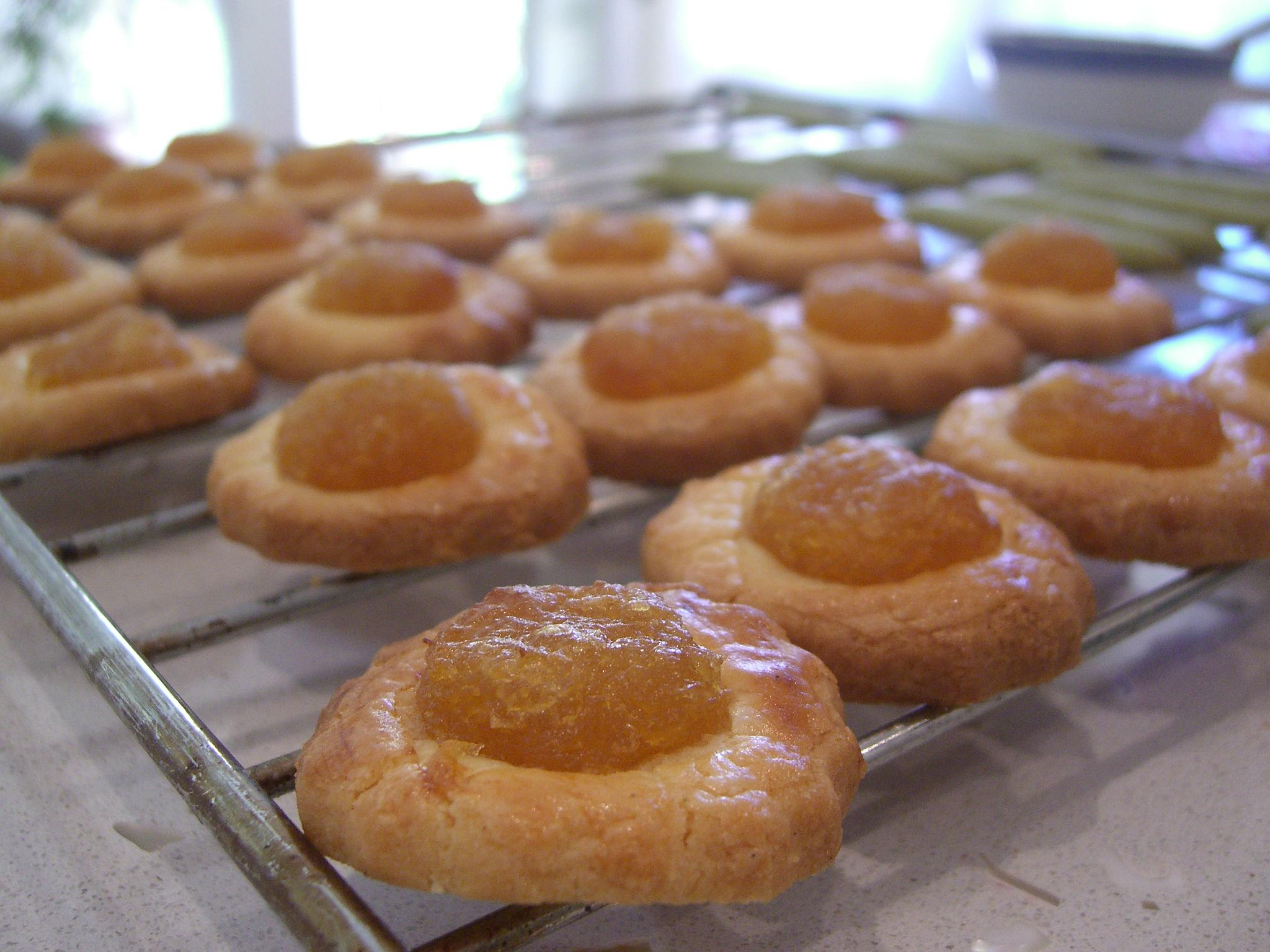
Peranakan pineapple tart, with pineapple jam on top

Considered a "festive cookie", pineapple tarts are especially popular during Chinese New Year celebrations in Singapore and Malaysia. They are also sold all year round by commercial bakeries and souvenir stores serving tourists.

=== Taiwan ===
The Taiwanese version of pineapple tart is known as fènglísū (鳳梨酥). The filling is fully enclosed within a rectangular tart. Generally the taste is sweet due to sugar added. However, many bakers add or even substitute pineapple with winter melon to make the jam less tart as well giving a less fibrous texture to the filling.

=== Australia ===
In Australia the term often refers to a variation on the neenish tart, with pineapple jam below the filling, and passionfruit icing.

== See also ==
- Kue
- Putri salju
