= Christmas in Indonesia =

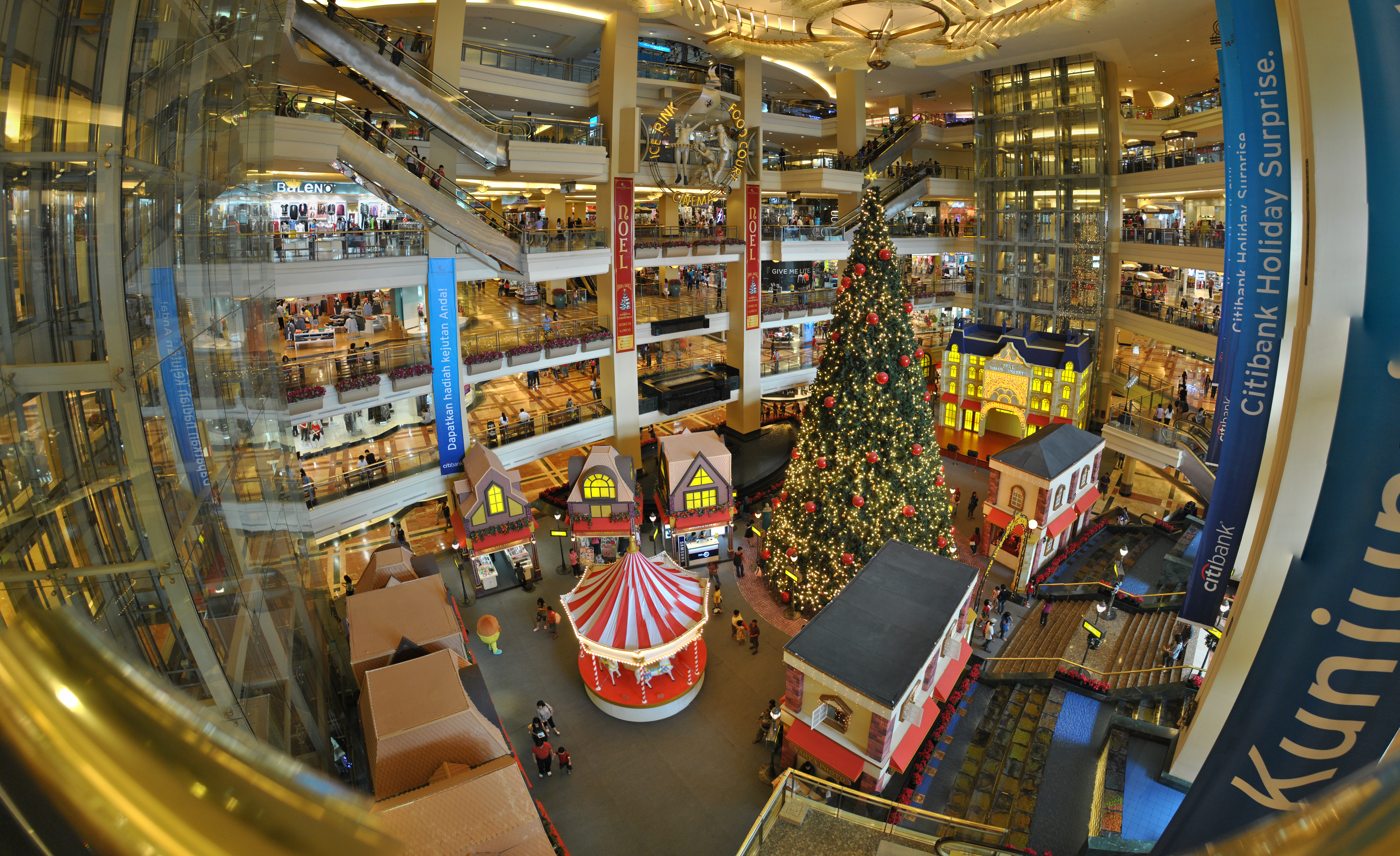
Christmas tree in Mall Taman Anggrek, Jakarta, Indonesia

Christmas in Indonesia, locally known as Natal from the Portuguese word for Christmas, is celebrated with various traditions throughout the country.

Despite the majority of Indonesians being Muslims, Christmas is still widely celebrated in Indonesia. Many Indonesians who are not Christian celebrate Christmas as a secular holiday.

== Overview ==
Indonesia has approximately 28 million Christians, of which about 70% are Protestant and 30% are Roman Catholics.

In regions with a Christian majority, both Protestants and Catholics celebrate Christmas with ceremonies and local food. In big cities, shopping centers are decorated with plastic Christmas trees and Santa Claus figures (locally known as Sinterklas, derived from the Dutch word Sinterklaas). Many local television channels broadcast Christmas musical concerts, and the government organizes the annual national Christmas celebration. In addition to traditional foods, there are also unique Christmas Day foods, such as traditional desserts like nastar (pineapple tart) and kastengel (from Dutch word kaasstengel), or 'putri salju'.

== By region ==
=== Jakarta ===
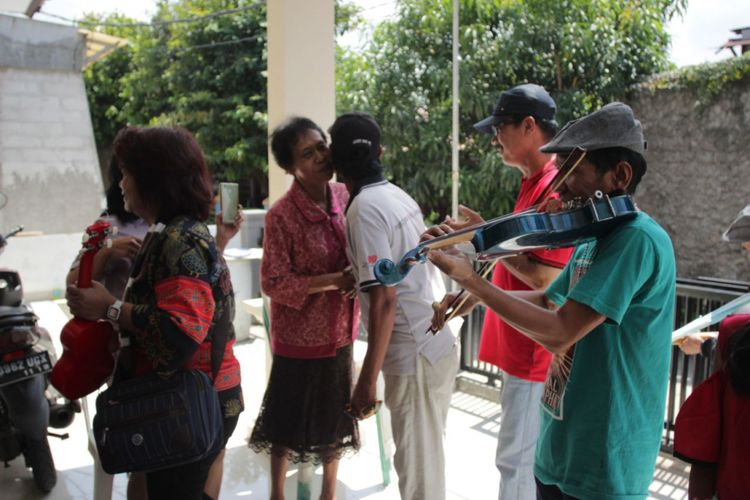
Gathering of the residents of Kampung Tugu in the Rabo-Rabo tradition

In North Jakarta, Indonesians of Portuguese descent live mainly in Kampung Tugu. After Christmas Mass, Christians in Kampung Tugu will visit the cemetery next to their local church and start the rabo-rabo tradition.

The rabo-rabo tradition consists of playing Kroncong music and dancing together around the village area. Locals will sing and visit each other's relatives. Relatives who are visited must later join the game until a chain of players forms on the streets. The visits will continue until they arrive at the last house in the area.

=== Papua ===
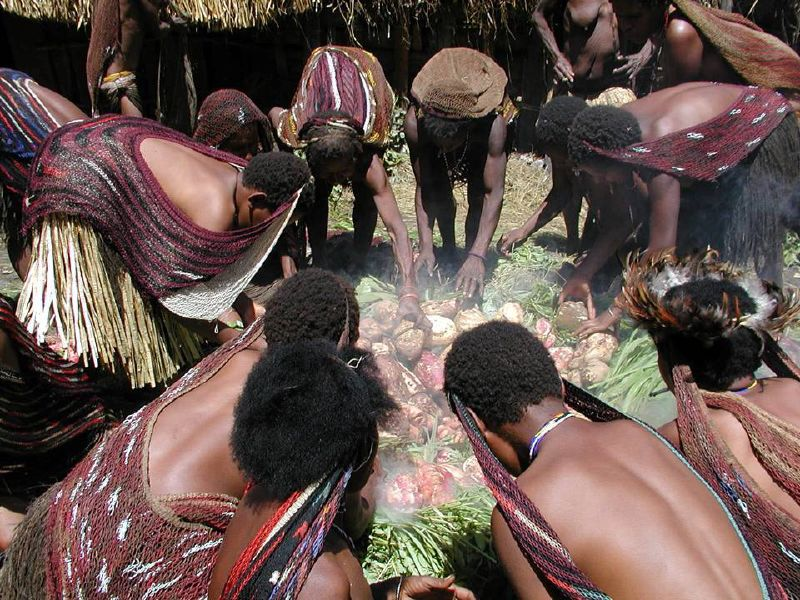
Christmas in Papua is marked with Barapen (grilling stone)

In the Papua region, after Christmas Mass, a ritual cooking of pork for feasting is held using a Barapen (grilling stone). The pork meat is cooked in between hot stones that are heated using wood. Instead of using matches, Papuan people scrape the wood continuously to produce heat to set it on fire. In order to prepare the Barapen, Papuan men dig a hole to put the hot stones in. At the same time, Papuan women prepare vegetables such as sweet potato, water spinach, fern, cassava, spinach, and papaya. Hot stones are stacked on the base of the hole and the pork and vegetables are put into the hole and covered with another layer of hot stones. The pork is cooked in the hole for half a day. The tradition of Barapen is an expression of gratitude, togetherness, sharing, and love, characterised by eating pork together.

=== Ambon ===
In Negeri Naku, South Leitimur, Ambon, there is a ceremony called cuci negeri (cleaning the nation). This ceremony symbolises the purification and liberation of sins from the local people and their environment. The cuci negeri starts with a gathering in the community function hall for each clan to hold their own traditional ritual. From there, the Ambonese walk to the traditional function hall. They sing and dance to the sounds of the tifa (traditional music instrument). Along the way, the women bring some offerings like betel, areca nut, and traditional drink called sopi. During Christmas Eve celebrations in the Maluku, church bells will ring and ships will sound their sirens.

=== Yogyakarta ===
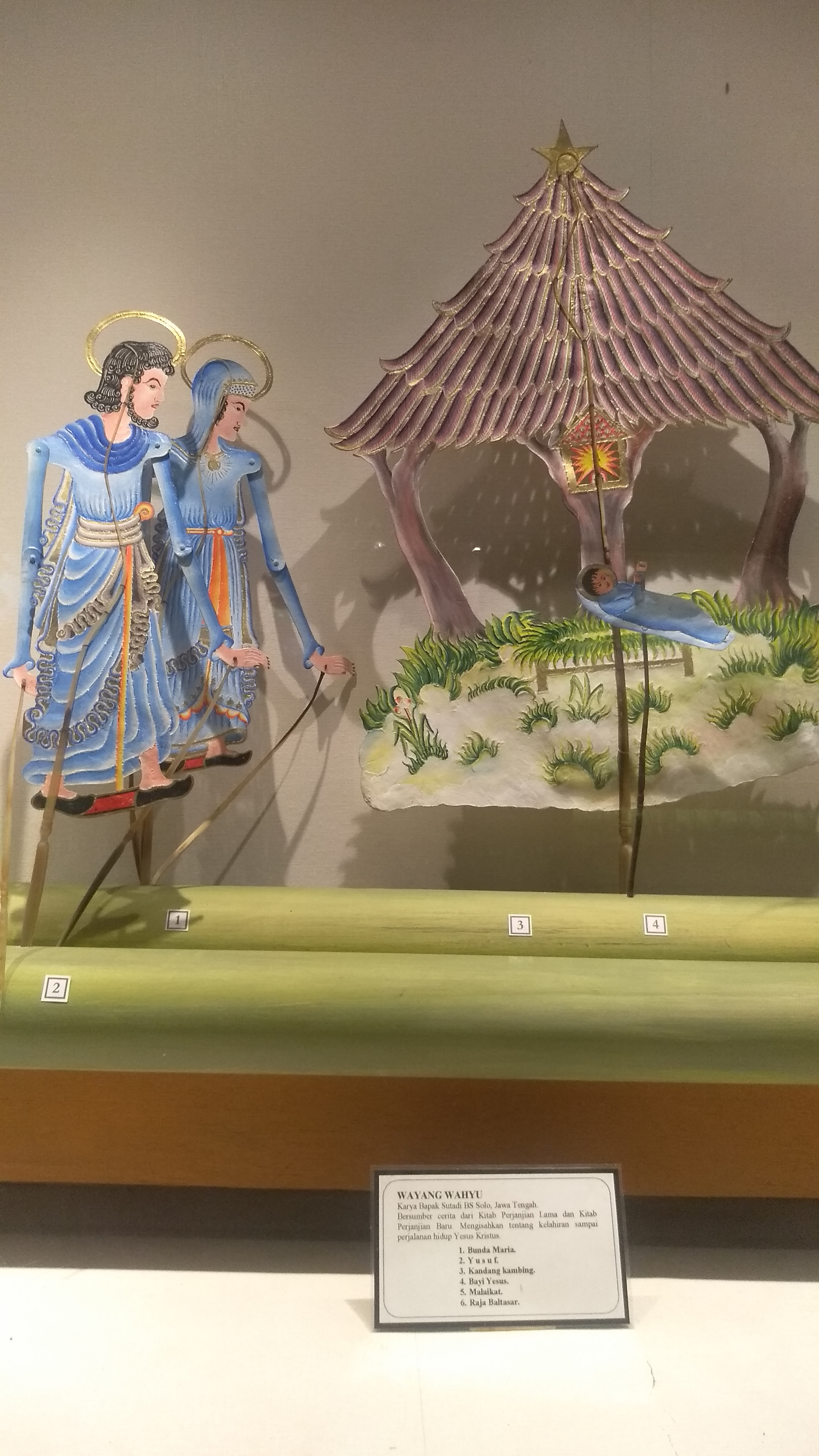
Wayang Kulit Wahyu

In the Yogyakarta Special Region, Christmas celebrations are marked by a wayang kulit adaptation of the Nativity scene. Church Mass for Catholics is led by the priest who wears traditional Javanese attire (wearing beskap and blankon) and gives sermon in local language. Similar to Eid (lebaran) and Chinese New Year (imlek), during Christmas Day, people visit families and relatives, with children often receiving money in an envelope from elders.

=== Manado ===
The pre-Christmas celebrations in Manado start from 1 December when the regional government officers go on the "Christmas Safari" and observe the Mass in a different district every day. As part of tradition, some residents of Manado join a carnival or visit and clean their families' graves. The series of Christmas celebrations will finish in the first week of January with a festival called kunci taon. During this festival, there is a carnival across the region featuring unique costumes.

=== Bali ===
Most Christian villages in Bali are located on the southern side of the island. In those villages, road decorations called penjor (made from yellow coconut leaves) are made for Christmas, which symbolise the Anantaboga dragon. The Christmas celebration draws influence from Balinese Hinduism.

In Bali, the Christmas tree is made from chicken feathers. This unique tree has been imported to some European countries.

=== Toraja ===
Torajan people celebrate Christmas by having a cultural festival called Lovely December. This festival consists of dancing, a culinary celebration, cultural carnival, bamboo music performance and handicraft exhibition. The festival is ended by fireworks and Lettoan procession which is held on 26 December. Lettoan is a ritual of having pig parade with cultural symbols that represent three dimensions of human life. Those three symbols are:

- Saritatolamban, shaped like stairs, which represents a prayer and hope for a better life (as the steps which always go up).
- The Sun, which represents the source of life and light.
- Tabang flower, which represents success in the Torajan people's life.

=== North Sumatra ===
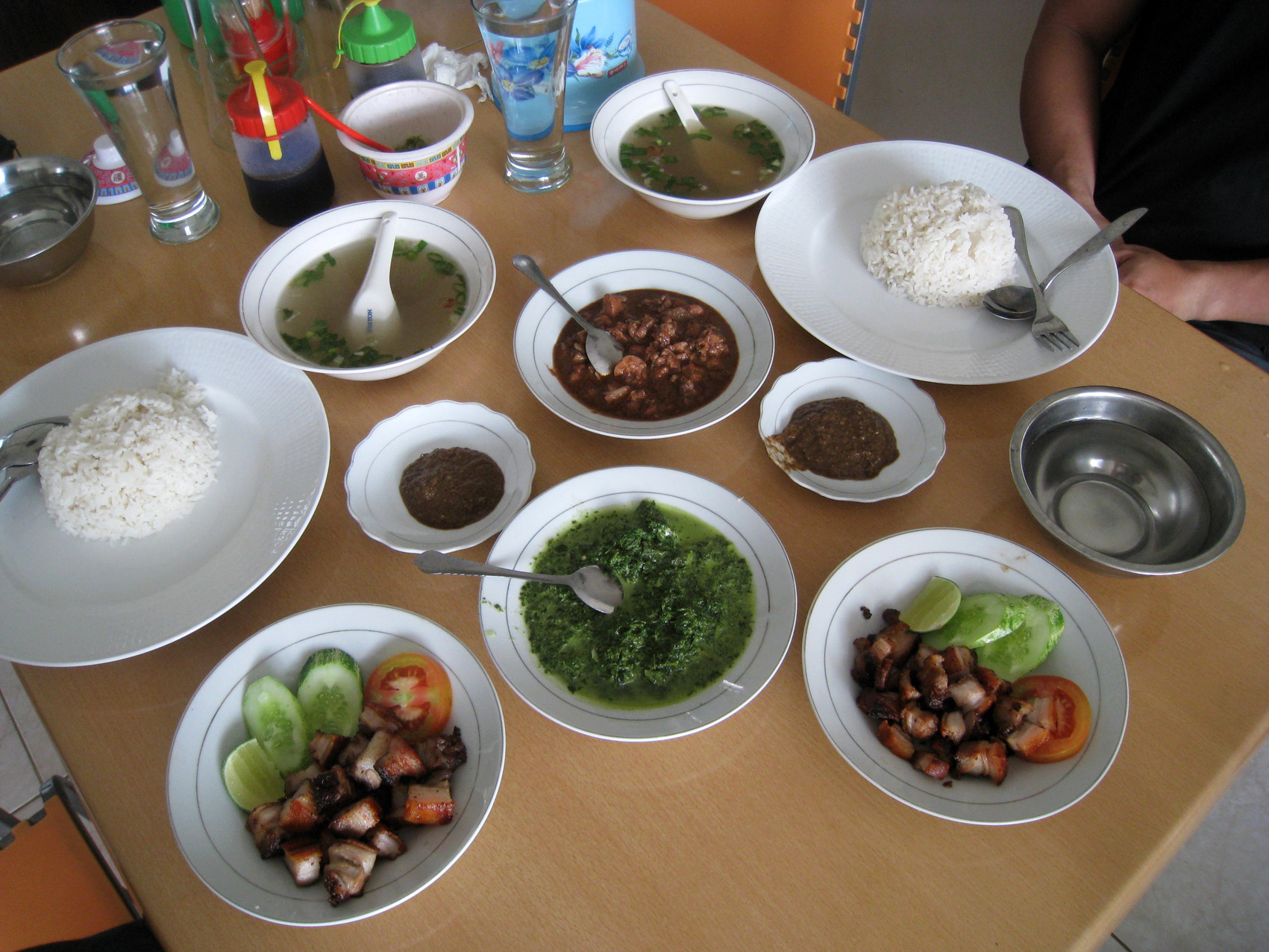
Batak Babi panggang, it usually serves as main course in Christmas

For the Batak in North Sumatra, Christmas Day is always followed by sacrificing an animal. The local people will save money for months beforehand and buy this animal together. This tradition is called marbinda and shows togetherness and mutual cooperation. The sacrificed animal can be a pig, a buffalo, or an ox, and the meat will be shared to all the people that participate in the purchasing of the animal.

== National Christmas Celebration ==
Every year, the Ministry of Religious Affairs holds the National Christmas Celebration of the Republic of Indonesia. The program started in 1993 after a suggestion from Tiopan Bernhard Silalahi, who was Minister of Administrative and Bureaucratic Reform in the Sixth Development Cabinet, who has Protestant background, to the then President of Indonesia Suharto. Since that time, the National Christmas Celebration has been held almost every year (and was held as a virtual event due to the COVID-19 pandemic in 2020–21). Exceptions were in 2004, which was canceled as a condolence for the victims of the 2004 Indian Ocean earthquake and tsunami, in 2018, which was canceled as a condolence for the victims of the 2018 Sunda Strait tsunami, and in 2022, which was also planned to be cancelled before being delayed at the last minute as a condolence for the victims of the 2022 West Java earthquake.

Until 2013, National Christmas Celebration was held in Jakarta and the most common used venue was Jakarta Convention Center. Since 2014, the tradition was changed by the then newly elected President of Indonesia Joko Widodo. This is the list of National Christmas Celebration hosts since 2014:

Year	Host	Province	Date	Remarks
2014	Jayapura City	Papua	27 December 2014	For the first time National Christmas Celebration was held outside Jakarta Special Capital Region
2015	Kupang City	East Nusa Tenggara	28 December 2015	
2016	Minahasa Regency	North Sulawesi	27 December 2016	For the first time National Christmas Celebration was held in a regency
2017	Pontianak City	West Kalimantan	28 December 2017	For the first time outside the capital of Indonesia, National Christmas Celebration will be held in a province and a city whose majority of population are not Christians
2019	Bogor	West Java	27 December 2019	
2023	Surabaya	East Java	27 December 2023	

== See also ==
- Christianity in Indonesia
