= Lebaran =

Indonesian term for Islamic holidays

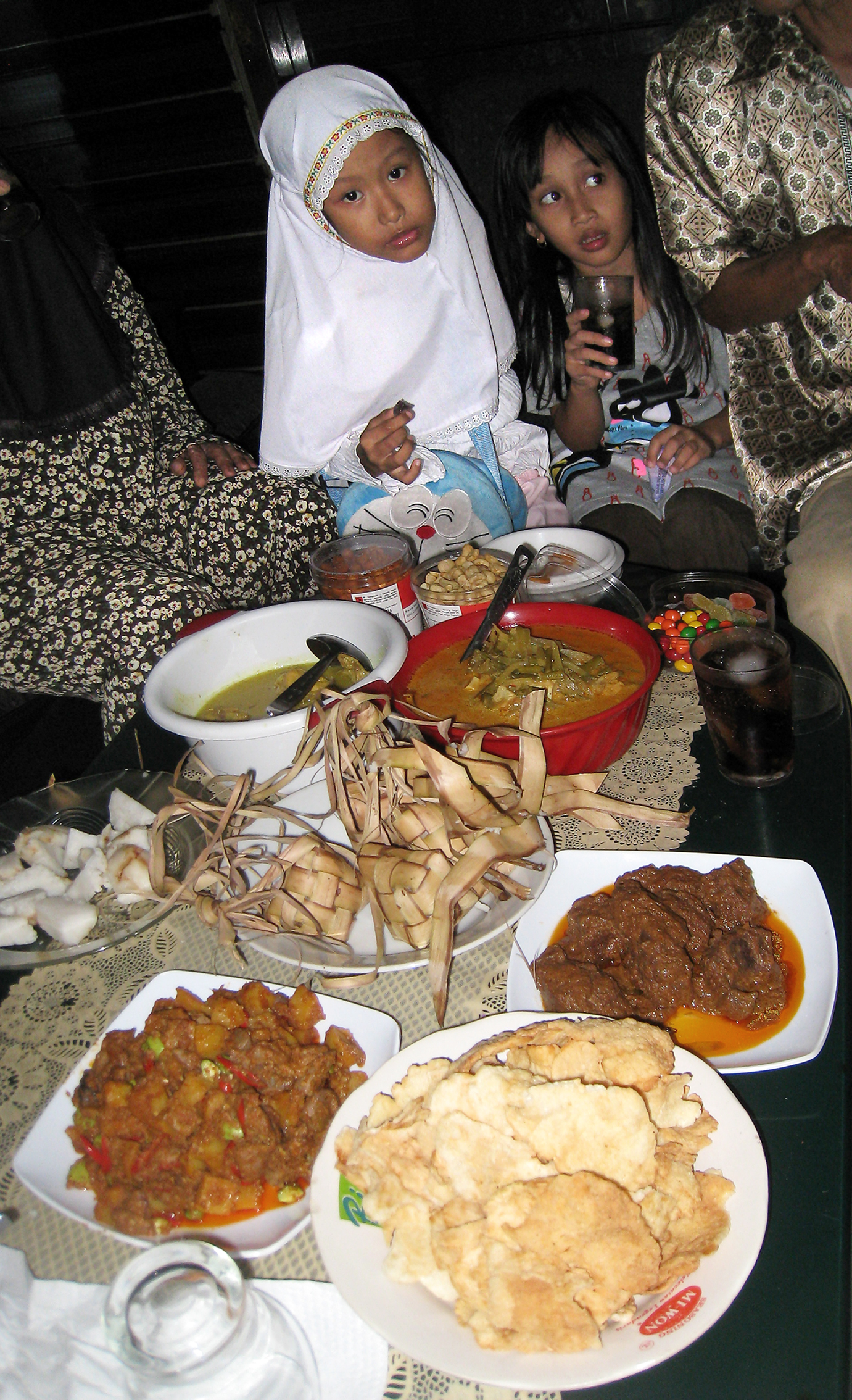
- Family get together to have lebaran feast; ketupat, sayur lodeh, opor ayam, rendang, sambal goreng ati and emping are usually served next to peanuts and candies.
- Official name: Hari Raya Lebaran
- Observed by: Indonesia (nationwide)
- Type: Religious
- Celebrations: Eid al-Fitr and Eid al-Adha
- Date: 1 Shawwal and 10 Dhu al-Hijjah
- Duration: 1-3 days
- Frequency: Annual

Lebaran is the Indonesian popular name for two Islamic official holidays, Eid al-Fitr and Eid al-Adha in Indonesia, and is one of the major national holidays in the country. Lebaran holiday officially lasts for two days in the Indonesian calendar, although the government usually declares a few days before and after the Lebaran as a bank holiday. Many individuals or families, especially Muslims take paid time off from their workplace during these days.

== Etymology ==
"Idulfitri" and "Idul Adha" are Indonesian spellings of Arabic "Eid al-Fitr" and "Eid al-Adha". While "lebaran" is a localized name for this festive occasion, the etymology is not clear. It is believed that it is derived from the Javanese word lebar which means "finished". The word "lebar" is absorbed into the Indonesian language with the additional suffix "-an", so it becomes a common vocabulary for a celebration when the fasting ritual is "finished". Lebaran might also be derived from Sundanese word lebar which means "abundance" or "many" to describe the abundance of foods and delicacies served for visiting guests; family, relatives, neighbors and friends during this festive occasion. Another theory suggested is that "lebaran" is derived from the Betawi language word lebar which means "wide and broad", so the celebration means to broaden or widen one's heart feeling after the fasting ritual of Ramadhan. Madurese people also have a similar word called lober to describe the completion of Ramadhan fast. It is also possible that the word 'lebaran' is derived from the word luber > luber-an > lebaran, which means overflowing or flocking.

The term lebaran is usually used specifically to describe the Eid al-Fitr Islamic holiday; however, in looser terms, it is sometimes used to describe similar festivals and celebrations. For example, in Indonesian, the term lebaran haji (lit. 'Hajj's lebaran') is informally used to describe Eid al-Adha, also lebaran cina (lit. 'Chinese lebaran') for Chinese New Year. Christmas, however, although bearing similarity in abundance of foods, is never referred to as lebaran, but just Natal or natalan instead.

== History ==
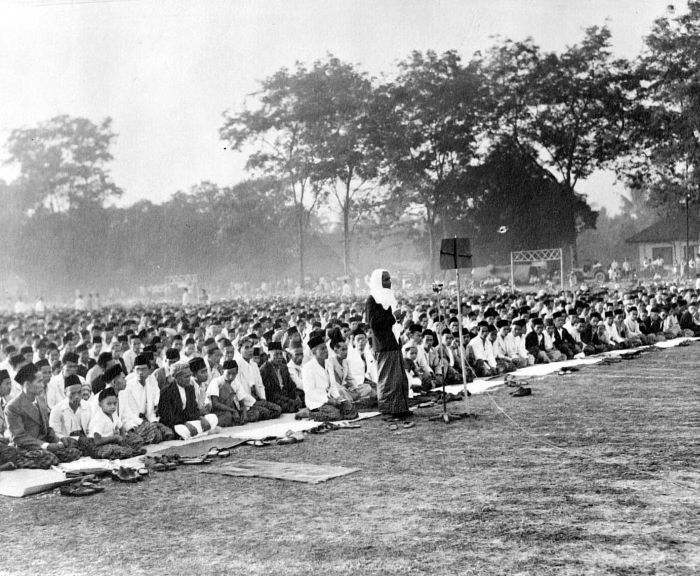
Eid mass prayer on open field during colonial Dutch East Indies period

The word Lebaran was derived from a Javanese word, and according to Indonesian Muslim scholar Umar Khayam, the lebaran tradition was the result of acculturation between Javanese culture and Islam during the 15th century. According to Javanese traditions, the local lebaran tradition of Idul Fitri was first started when Sunan Bonang, one of the Wali Songo of Tuban in 15th-century Java, called for the Muslims to elevate the perfection of their Ramadhan fast by asking forgiveness and forgiving others' wrongdoings. The asking and giving for forgiveness during Eid al-Fitr is quite unique among Indonesian Muslims and did not occur among Muslims of Middle East, Indian subcontinent or elsewhere. Most of the world's Muslims would only express Eid Mubarak (blessed Eid).

Other lebaran traditions that are uniquely local and derived from Javanese traditions are sungkem and consuming ketupat.Sungkem is the Javanese tradition of asking for blessing and forgiveness from parents, grandparents and elders. The parents sit on a chair while the children and youngsters bow deep with their nose tip touching their hands that rest upon parents' laps. It is a sign of humility, expressing dedication and honoring parents and elders. Another tradition is consuming ketupat or kupat in Javanese language. The tradition of preparing and consuming ketupat during lebaran is believed to have been introduced by Sunan Kalijaga, one of the Wali Songo who spread Islam in Java, as it contains some symbolism. It is believed that kupat means ngaku lepat or "admitting one's mistakes" in Javanese. The crossed weaving of palm leaves symbolizes people's mistakes and sins, and the inner whitish rice cake symbolizes purity and deliverance from sins after observing Ramadhan fast, prayer and rituals. Other than Java, the tradition of consuming ketupat during Eid ul Fitr also can be found throughout Indonesia, from Sumatra, Kalimantan, Sulawesi, and Nusa Tenggara, to neighboring Malaysia.

== Prior to Lebaran ==
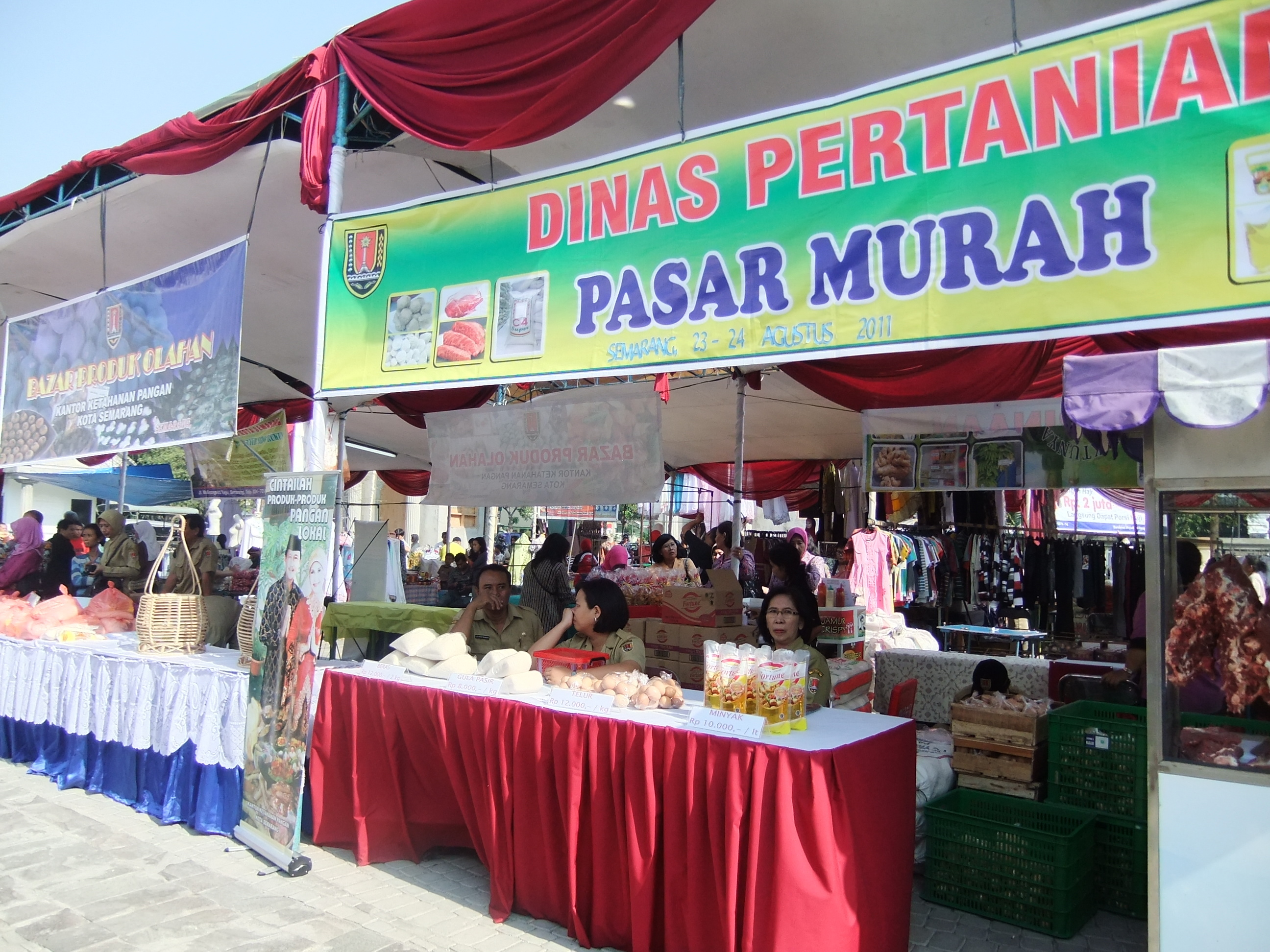
Ramadhan bazaar selling various products to celebrate Ramadhan and Lebaran

=== Lebaran bonus ===
Additionally, in Indonesia, Idulfitri has a legally mandated salary bonus for all employees, known as Tunjangan Hari Raya (THR) as initially enforced by Indonesia's Ministry of Manpower and Transmigration (Kementerian Tenaga Kerja dan Transmigrasi) in the 1950s. The mandated amount of this salary bonus differs by region. For example, within the Jakarta region, it must not be less than one month's full salary paid in advance of Idulfitri, in addition to the employee's regular salary. Thus, Idul Fitri is also a paid holiday. Breaching or withholding THR is a very serious labour law infraction and is punished severely, regardless of employer status or position.

=== Lebaran shopping ===
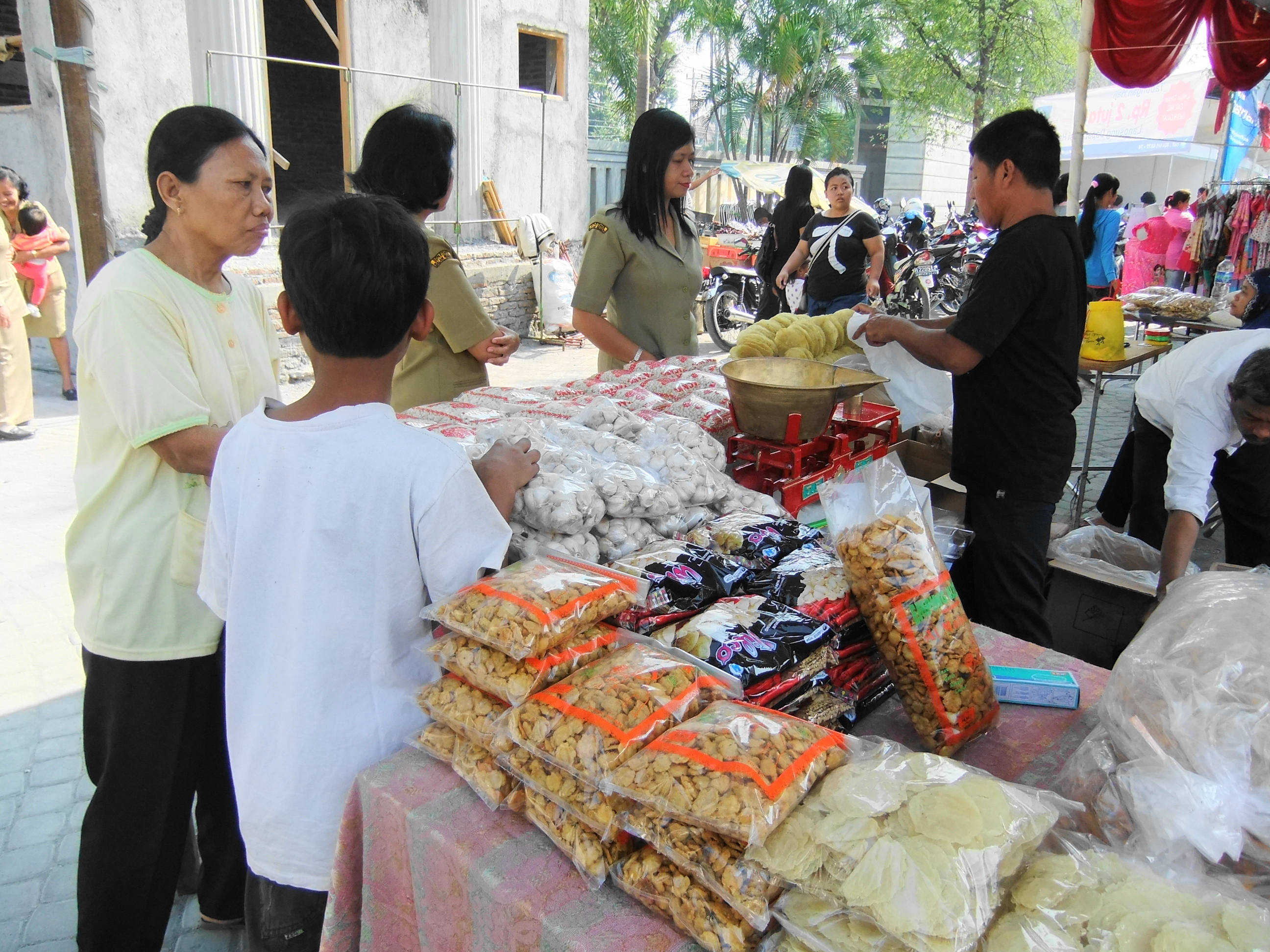
Lebaran bazaar in Semarang offering food and clothes for lebaran holiday

Other than shopping for typical food and kue kering (cookies) for Lebaran, Indonesians usually buy and wear new clothes and footwear. Shopping malls and bazaars are filled with people to get things for Lebaran such as clothes, footwear, and even food to serve days ahead of Idulfitri, which creates a distinctive festive atmosphere throughout the country, along with traffic mayhem around shopping malls and marketplaces.

Lebaran also creates special occasions for shopping that often generate seasonal retail business. Retail businesses try to attract shoppers with special Lebaran discounts, Lebaran-themed decorations, and playing joyous Lebaran-themed or Islamic music in their stores. The festive shopping feel is quite similar to Christmas for Christians, but the things bought (usually fashion apparel), are rather for oneself, not as a gift. Many banks, government and private offices are closed for the duration of the Lebaran festivities.

=== Mudik lebaran ===
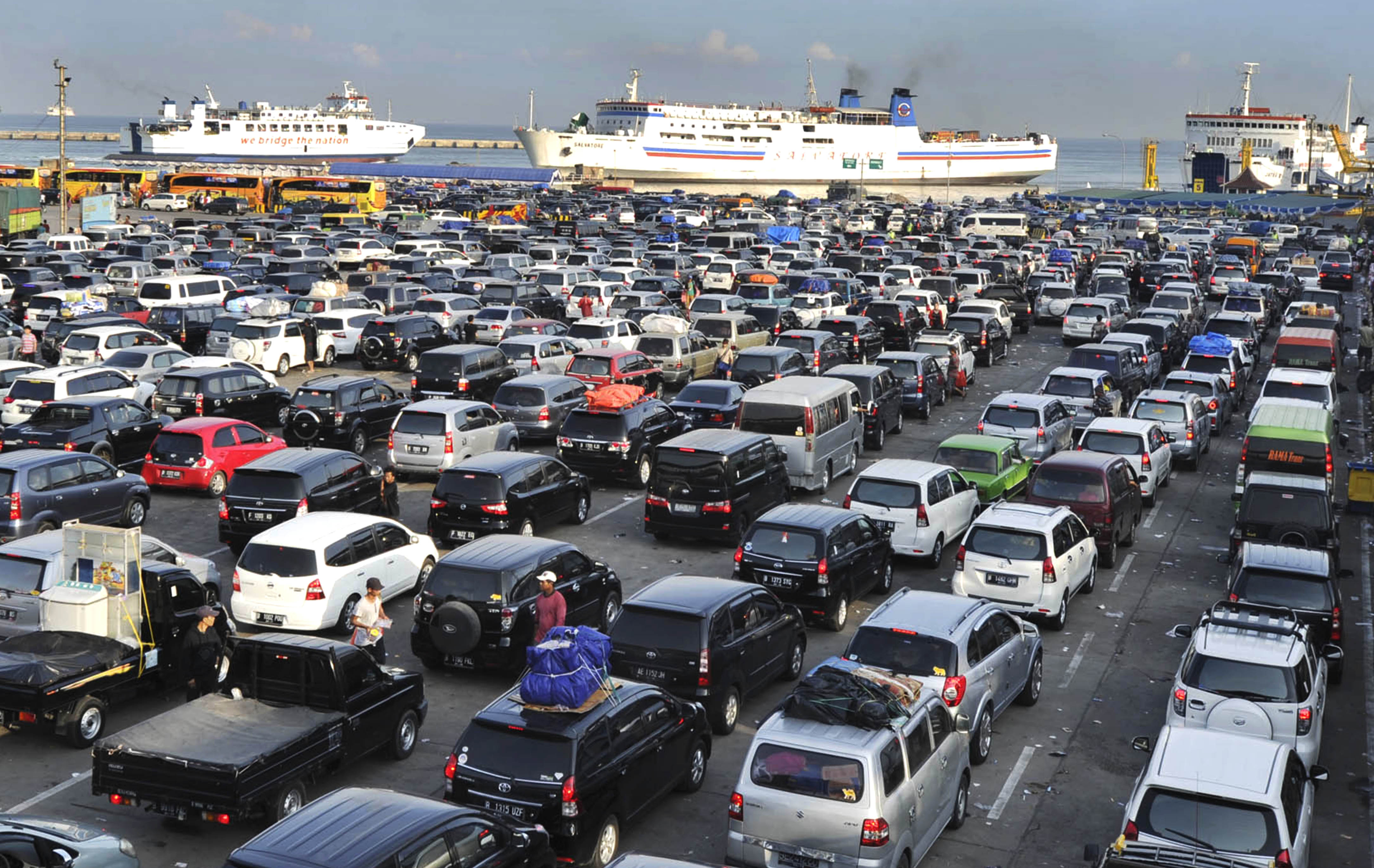
Thousands of cars clog the port during mudik home-coming.

One of the largest temporary human migrations globally is the prevailing custom of the Lebaran where workers, particularly unskilled labourers such as maids and construction workers, return to their home town or city to celebrate with their families and to ask forgiveness from parents, in-laws, and other elders. This is known in Indonesia as mudik or pulang kampung (homecoming). It is an annual tradition that people in big cities such as Greater Jakarta, Bandung, or Surabaya travel to their hometowns or other cities to visit relatives, to ask forgiveness, or just to celebrate with the whole family. The government of Indonesia provides additional transportation to handle the massive surge of travellers for several days before and after the lebaran. In 2013, around 30 million people travelled to their hometowns during lebaran, spending a total of around 90 trillion rupiah (around US$9 billion) from main urban centers to rural areas, pulsing economic opportunities and business from the city to the villages. The number of Indonesians who took mudik or pulang kampung travel is tremendous, a number similar to the whole population of Malaysia travelling simultaneously, causing massive traffic jams and a sudden rise of demand and volume of intercity transportation.

The impact is huge, as millions of cars and motorcycles jam the roads and highways, causing kilometres of traffic jams each year. This massive annual congestion usually occurs along Java's Northern Coast Road. Additionally, the wealthier classes often go to local hotels or overseas to accommodate the absence of their domestic servants, drivers and even security guards. Singaporean, Malaysian and Indonesian hotels have been particularly successful in marketing lucrative Lebaran or Idulfitri "escape packages".

=== Takbiran ===
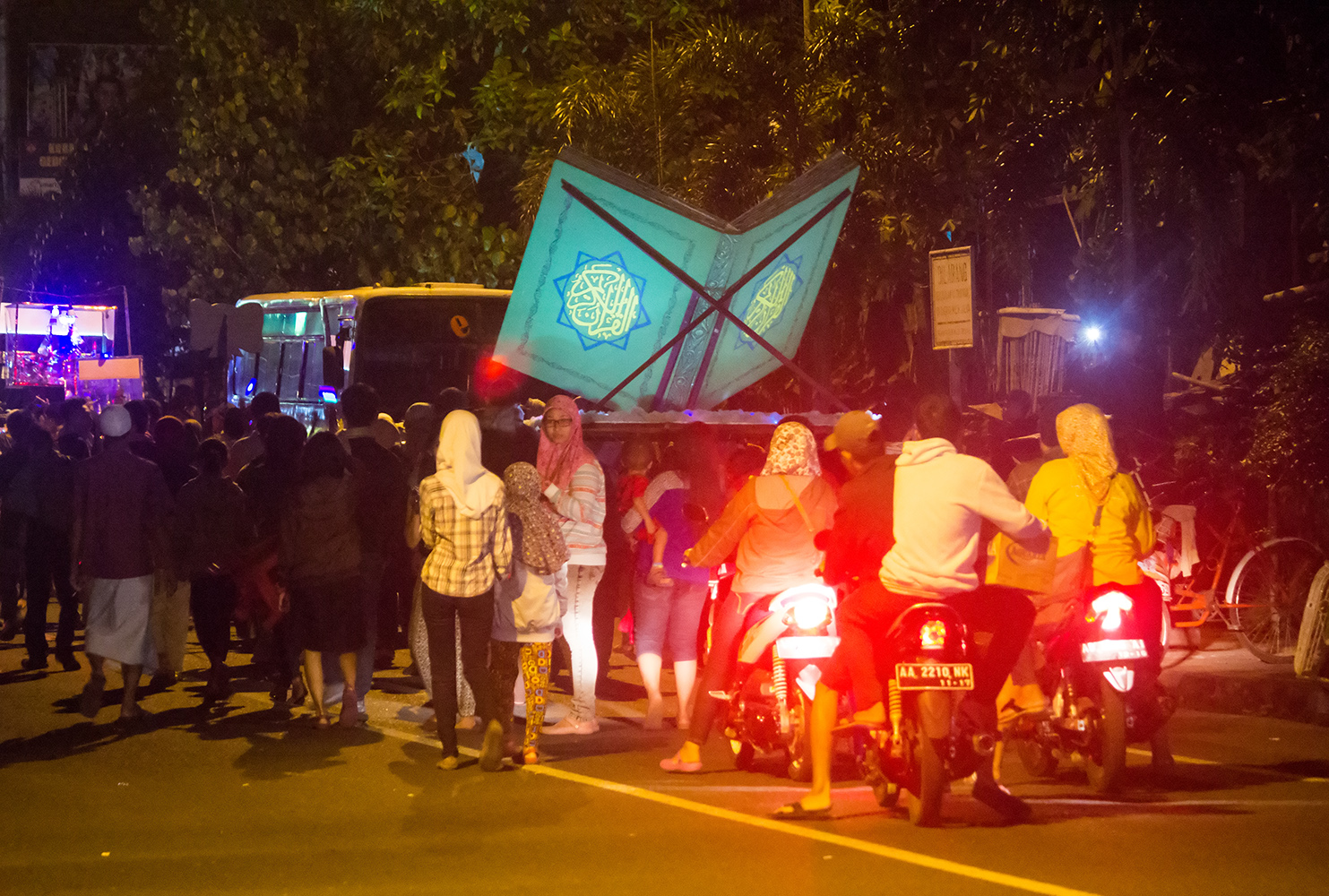
Takbiran parade in Yogyakarta, a night before Lebaran

The night before Idulfitri is called takbiran, filled with the sounds of bedug drums and many muezzin chanting the takbir in the mosques or musallahs. In larger cities, people fill the streets and chant takbir from their cars and motorcycles, often creating more traffic jams. In some instances, fireworks and firecrackers are ignited, but this is discouraged by police as it could be dangerous to light these explosives over the crowd. In many parts of Indonesia, especially in rural areas, pelita, obor or lampu tempel (oil lamps, similar to tiki torches) are lit and placed outside and around homes. Some cities, such as Yogyakarta, organize a festive annual parade featuring colorful, Islamic-themed lantern-like floats.

== Lebaran day ==
On the Lebaran day, after performing the Eid prayer in the morning, people dressed in their new or best clothes will gather to greet their family and neighbours. It is common to greet people with "Selamat Idulfitri", which means "Happy Eid". Muslims also greet one another with "mohon maaf lahir dan batin", which means "Forgive my physical and emotional (wrongdoings)", because Idul Fitri is not only for celebrations but also a time for atonement to ask for forgiveness for sins which have been cleansed as a result of the fasting in the Muslim month of Ramadan. From morning to afternoon, the zakat alms for the poor are distributed in mosques.

=== Lebaran feast ===
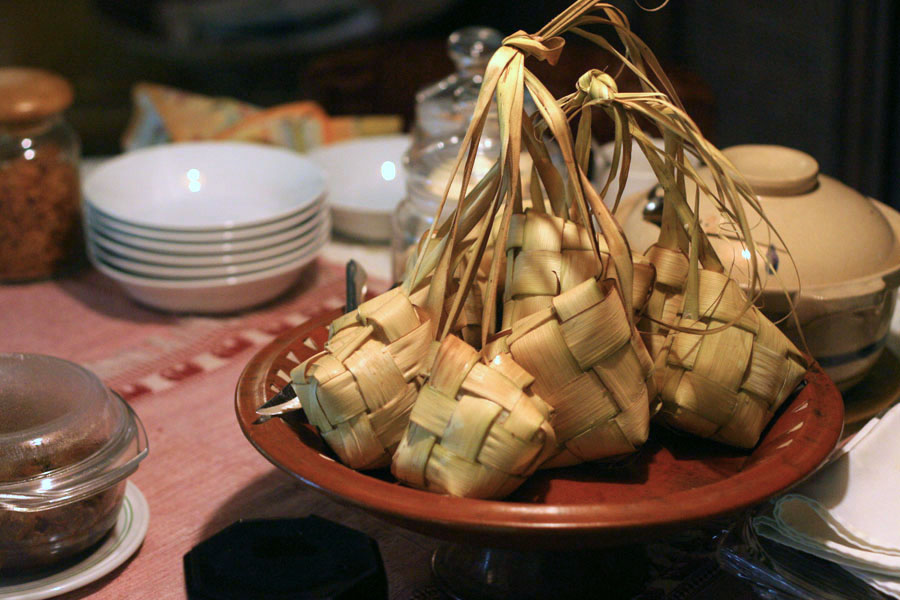
Ketupat is a popular traditional celebrative dish for Eid al-Fitr meals in Brunei, Indonesia, Malaysia, Singapore and Southern Thailand.

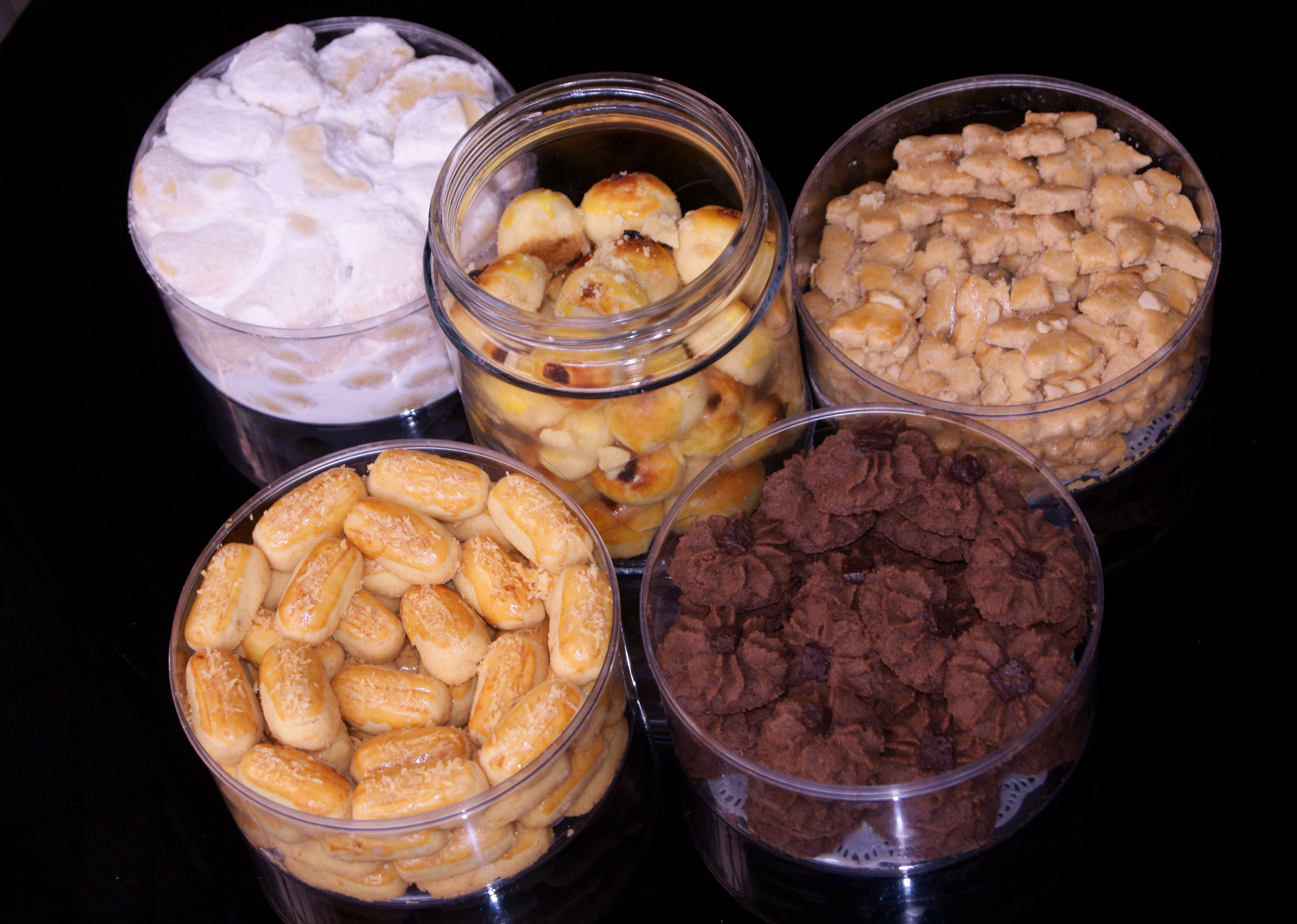
Kue kering, such as kaasstengels, putri salju, nastar, peanut cookies and choco-chip cookies are popular lebaran cookies

Families usually have a special Lebaran meal served during breakfast, brunch or lunch; special dishes include ketupat, opor ayam, rendang, sambal goreng ati, sayur lodeh and lemang (a type of glutinous rice cake cooked in bamboo). Various types of snacks such as roasted peanuts, kue, kue kering (cookies) especially kaasstengels, nastar and putri salju, dodol and imported dates sweet delicacies are served during the day, together with fruit syrup beverages.

The lively or alternatively very emotional devotional music blended with Quranic verses associated with Ramadan and Eid – known as Kaisidah or more correctly, Qasida – can be heard throughout the country. These are commonly performed by famous musicians, some of whom may be international stars, and televised nationwide.

=== Silaturrahmi and lebaran money ===
Younger families usually visit their older neighbours or relatives to wish them a happy Eid and to ask for forgiveness. During these visits, it is customary for older, established or married couples to give uang lebaran, a small amount of money, to their own children, as well as those of relatives and neighbours. Idul Fitri is a joyous day for children, as adults give them money in colourful envelopes. Indonesian banks and Bank Indonesia usually open some money changer counters to change larger to smaller denominations several days before Lebaran. The denominations may vary from 1,000 to 10,000 rupiah. The sudden rise of demand for goods (especially food) and services (especially transportation), and the pulsing and distribution of newly printed small denomination bank notes from the central bank, gives the Indonesian economy a seasonal inflation annually.

=== Lebaran costumes ===
It is customary for Muslim Indonesians to wear traditional clothing on Eid al-Fitr. The male outfit is known as baju koko: a collarless long- or short-sleeve shirt with traditional embroidered designs with a "kilt" sarung of songket, ikat or similar woven, plaid-cloth. Alternatively, they may wear Western-style business suits or more traditional loose-fitting trousers with colour-matched shirts and a peci hat or regional cultural headwear and songkok. The Malay variant worn in Malaysia, Singapore, Brunei, Southern Thailand and parts of Indonesia (especially Sumatera and Kalimantan) is known as the Baju Melayu, shirt worn with a sarong known as kain samping or songket and a headwear known as songkok.

The traditional female dress is known as kebaya kurung. It consists of, normally, a loose-fitting kebaya blouse (which may be enhanced with brocade and embroidery), a long skirt both of which may be batik, or the sarung skirt made of batik, ikat or songket and for some women either the jilbab (hijab) or its variant the stiffened kerudung Veil.

Non-Austronesian Muslims, or even non-Muslims may don costumes of their respective culture and tradition, or Islamic clothes to show respect to their relatives' or friends' differing religious beliefs for the occasion. This is particularly common in Indonesia, where many families have close friends or relatives of differing faiths, namely Catholic, some Protestant, some Hindu, Buddhist and Muslim, or even Confucian.

=== Visiting graves ===
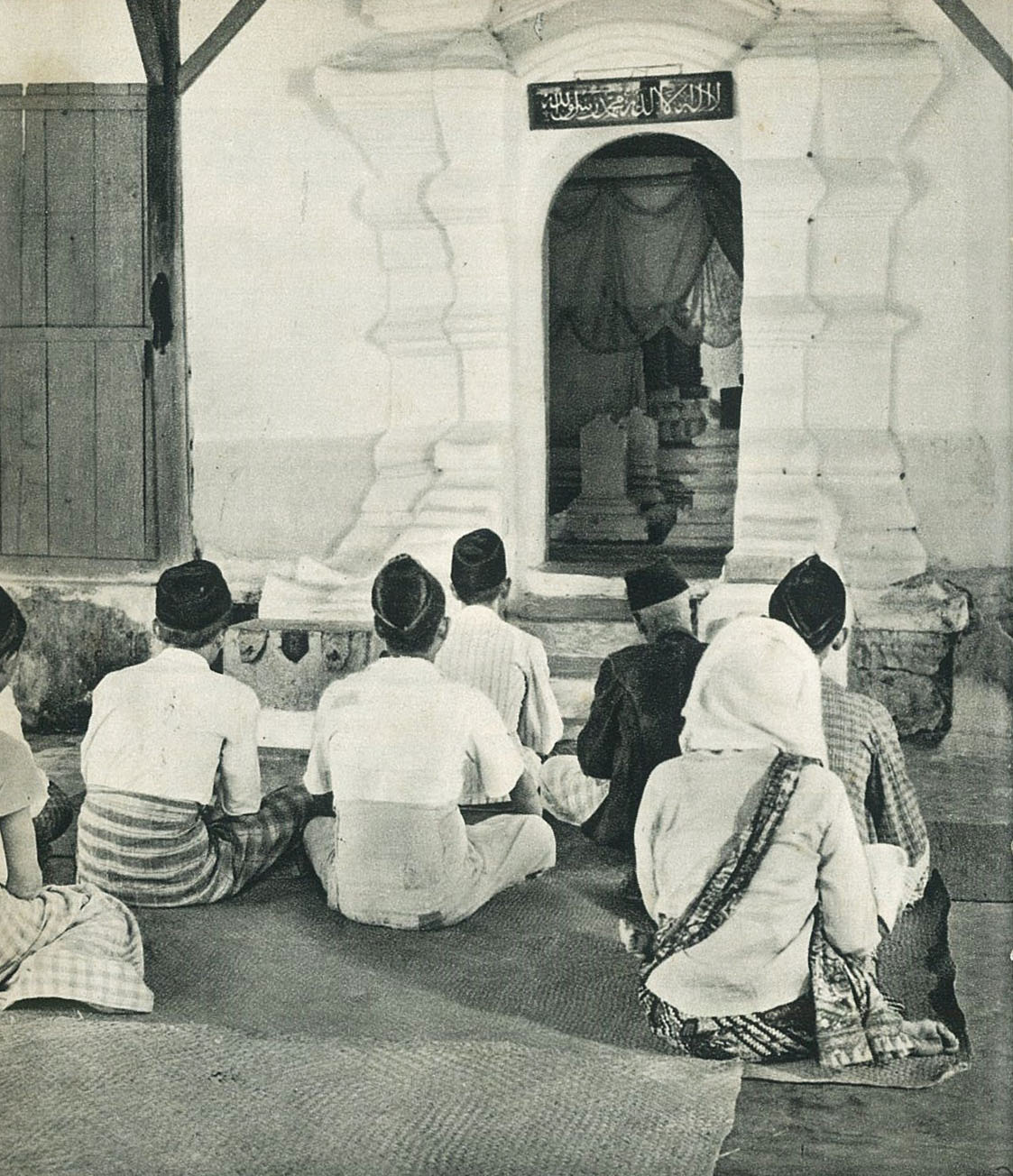
Ziarah makam or visiting the grave of family or prominent Muslim figure

It is common for many Muslims in Indonesia to visit the graves of loved ones several days before Ramadhan. During this visit, they clean the grave, recite Ya-Seen, a chapter (sura) from the Quran, and perform the tahlil ceremony. These are done as a means to ask God to forgive both the dead and the living for their sins. The Javanese majority of Indonesia is known for their pre-Islamic Kejawen traditions of washing the headstone using scented water from the traditional terracotta water-jug, the kendi, and sprinkling hyacinth and jasmine over the graves.

== After lebaran ==
Several days after lebaran are usually marked with arus balik (returning waves) of mudik lebaran (lebaran home-coming). People return to cities of their workplaces from their hometowns, and just like the mudik lebaran it creates massive temporary migrations that require large amounts of transportation for travellers and often results in gridlock traffic.

=== Halal bi-halal ===
In Indonesia, there is a special ritual called halal bi-halal. During this, Indonesian Muslims visit their elders, in the family, the neighborhood, or their work, and show respect to them. This may be done during or several days after Idulfitri. Usually, core family and neighbors are visited on the first day of Idulfitri, further relatives on the next day, and colleagues days to weeks later after they get back to work. They will also seek reconciliation (if needed), and preserve or restore harmonious relations.
