= Bar cookie =

Baked good

Bar cookies, called tray bakes in the UK and slices in Australia and New Zealand, are a type of cookie or dense, often chewy, cake that is baked in a shallow flat baking pan such as a square or rectangular cake pan. They can be eaten as a handheld or plated dessert. Brownies are a notable example.

== Preparation ==
Bar cookies generally are made by spreading a thick batter into a cake pan and baking. Unlike typical cookies, bar cookies contain more egg and shortening, producing a texture that more closely resembles a cake.

Some versions are layered by spreading a layer of batter, topping with a layer or fruit, nuts, chocolate chips, or other ingredients, and topping with another layer of batter before baking. Typically bar cookies are cooled completely before cutting into their final shape.

== Popularity ==
Bar cookies are quicker and easier to make than many other desserts, can be made ahead, and travel well, making them popular for events like potlucks. They are versatile and less likely to fail than many baked desserts, which tend to require following recipes exactly. They can often be eaten out of hand, making them popular for casual events and large gatherings.

Bar cookies also are often more substantial than a drop or rolled cookie, which means a single serving can be sufficient.

== History ==
According to Pillsbury, bar cookie entries became increasingly common in the company's Pillsbury Bake-Off competition during the 1970s.

== Nomenclature ==
In the UK, the term tray bake is used as an umbrella term for any dessert baked in a flat pan and cut into small rectangular portions for serving, including what is called a sheet cake in the US; school cake is an example. In Australia and New Zealand, the term slice can be used for both savory and sweet foods that are baked in a flat pan and cut into small rectangular portions; a zucchini slice is an example of a savory version.

Other names include pan cookies, and squares.

== Notable examples ==
- Blondie
- Brookie
- Brownie
- Caramel shortbread
- Confetti square
- Date square
- Fifteens
- Flapjack
- Food for the Gods
- Lemon square
- Nanaimo bar
- Shortbread
- Vanilla slice

== Other examples ==
A "brookie", a portmanteau of "brownie" and "cookie", is a bar cookie made by spreading a layer of brownie batter over a layer of cookie dough, typically chocolate chip cookie, before baking and slicing into squares.

== Similar dishes ==
Dessert bars are also a dessert that is baked in a flat pan and cut into squares.
