= List of baked goods =

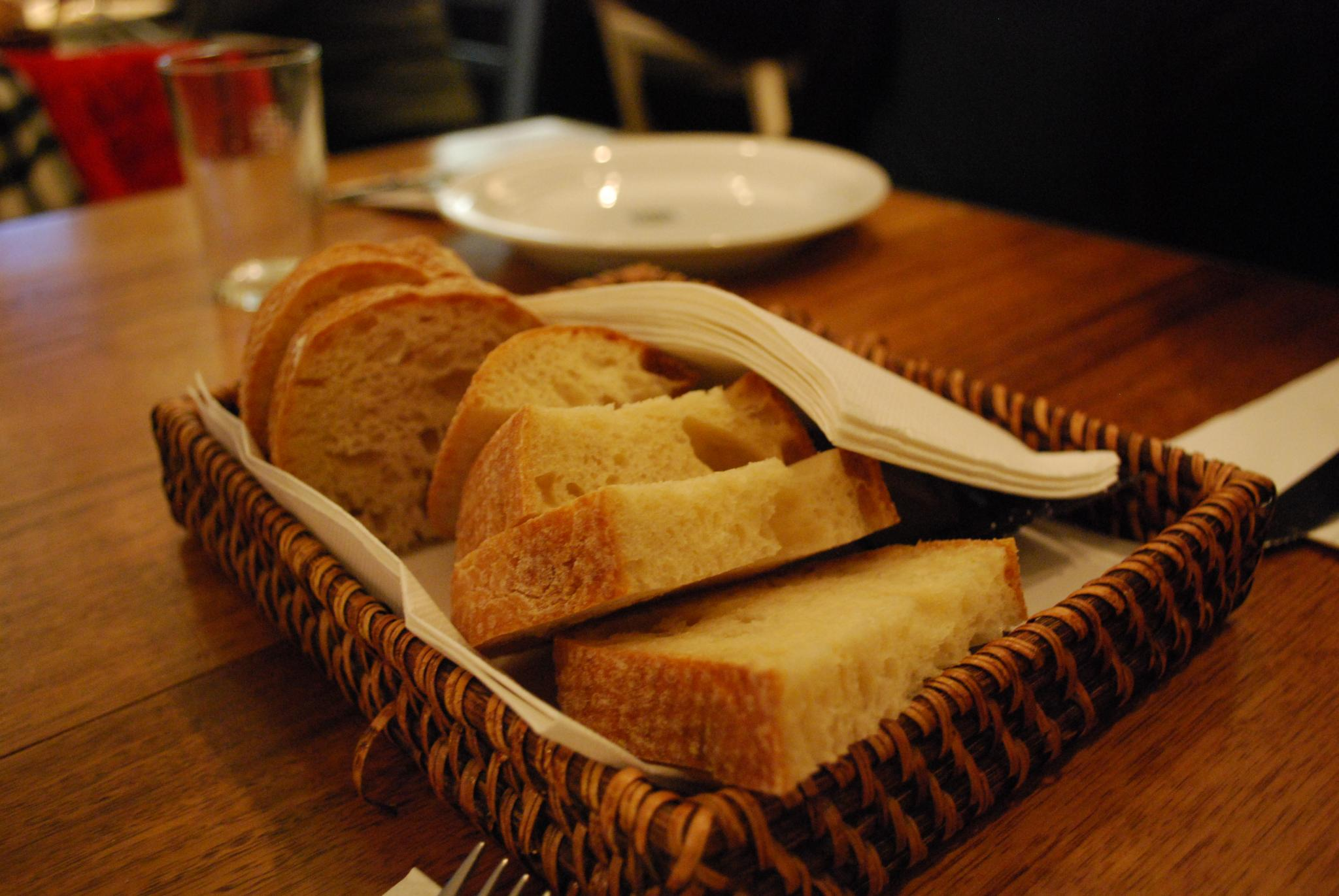
Breads at a restaurant

This is a list of baked goods. Baked goods are foods made from dough or batter and cooked by baking, a method of cooking food that uses prolonged dry heat, normally in an oven, but also in hot ashes, or on hot stones. The most common baked item is bread but many other types of foods are baked as well.

== Baked goods ==
=== By type ===
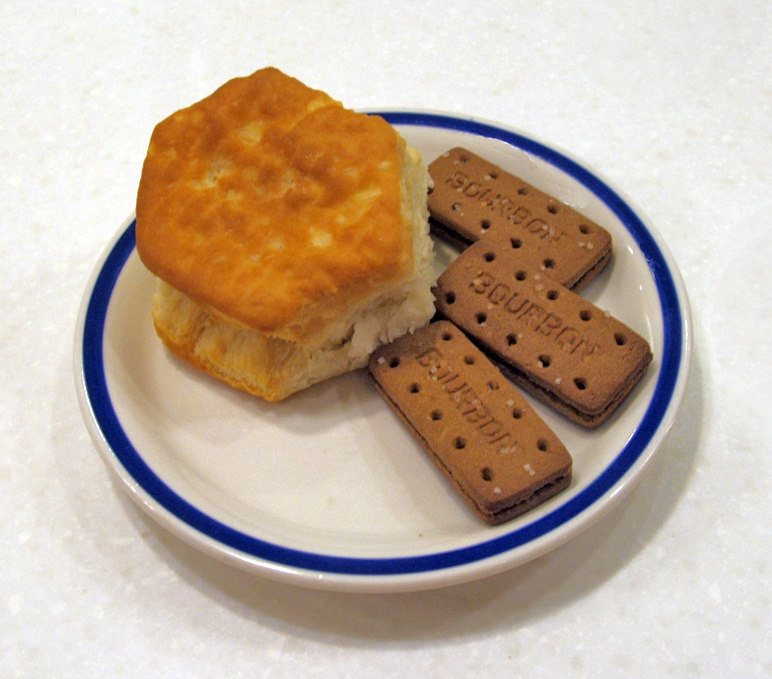
American and British biscuits are baked goods.

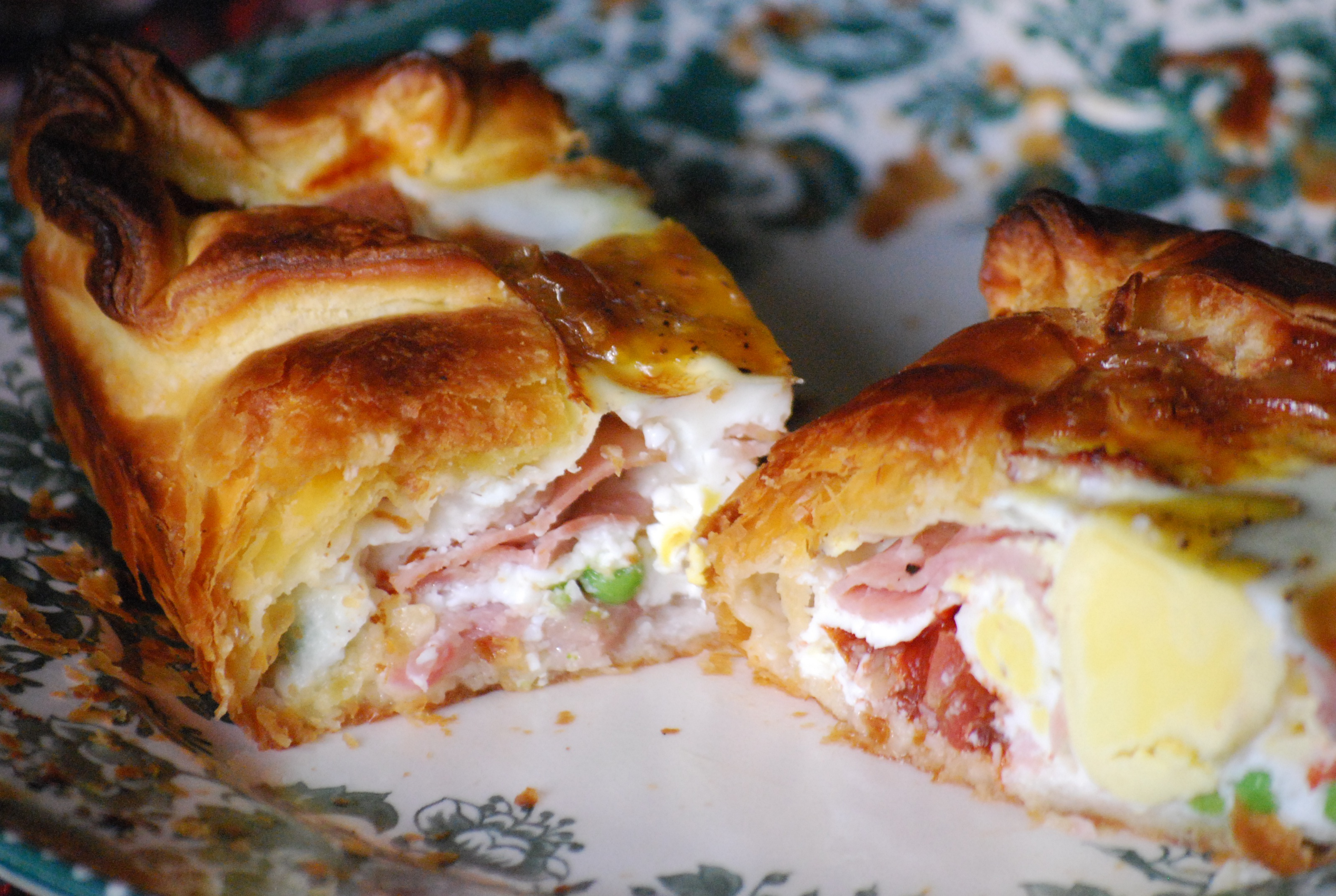
A bacon and egg pie

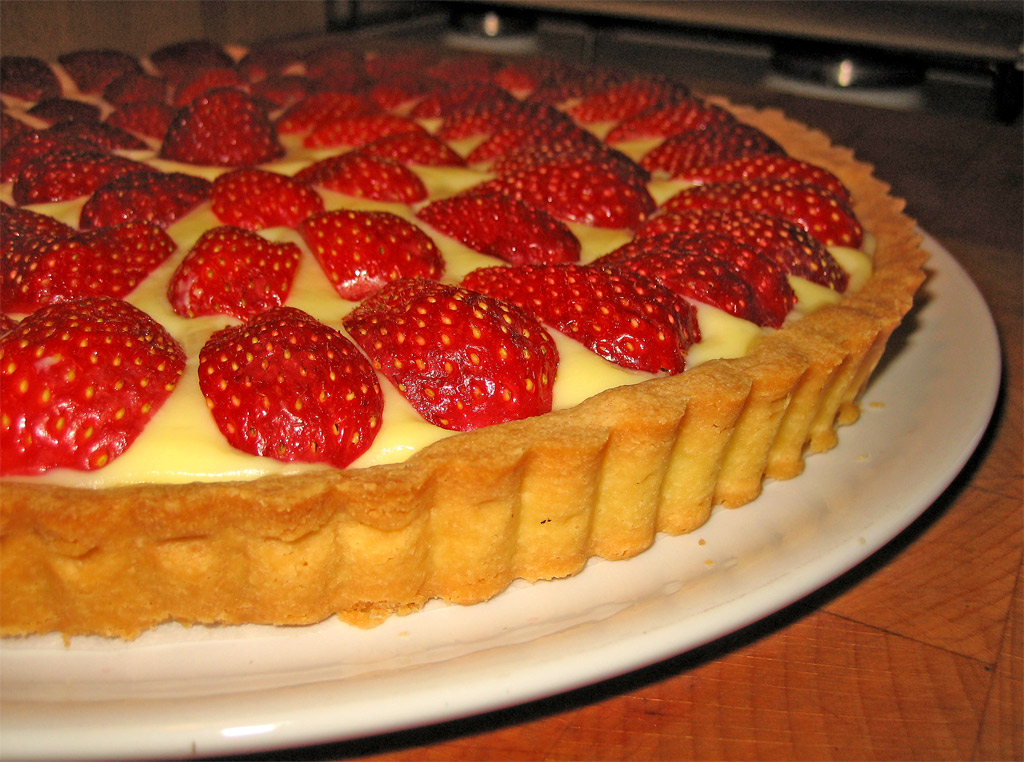
Close-up view of a crostata, a type of Italian tart or pie

- Biscuit – a term used for a variety of baked, commonly flour-based food products. The term is applied to two distinct products in North America and the United Kingdom, and is also distinguished from U.S. versions in the Commonwealth of Nations and Europe.

- Ground biscuit

- Bread – a staple food prepared from a dough of flour and water, usually by baking.

- Bagel – a bread product originating in Jewish communities of Poland traditionally shaped by hand into the form of a ring from yeasted wheat dough, roughly hand-sized, which is first boiled for a short time in water and then baked.
- Bread roll – a small, often round loaf of bread served as a meal accompaniment (eaten plain or with butter)

- Bun – a small, sometimes sweet, bread, or bread roll. Though they come in many shapes and sizes, they are most commonly hand-sized or smaller, with a round top and flat bottom.

- Flatbread – a bread made with flour, water and salt, and then thoroughly rolled into flattened dough. Many flatbreads are unleavened—made without yeast—although some are slightly leavened, such as pita bread.
- Muffin – an individual-sized, baked quick bread product. American muffins are similar to cupcakes in size and cooking methods, and the English muffin is a type of yeast-leavened bread. Muffins may also classify as cakes with their same sweet interior and fluffy yeast exterior

- Brownie – a flat, baked dessert square that was developed in the United States at the end of the 19th century and popularized in both the U.S. and Canada during the first half of the 20th century
  - Blondie – a form of brownies that are lighter in color from brown sugar and vanilla rather than chocolate.
  - Brookie – a hybrid dessert that combines cookies and brownies.
- Cake – a form of sweet dessert that is typically baked. In its oldest forms, cakes were modifications of breads but now cover a wide range of preparations that can be simple or elaborate.

- Cookie – a small, flat, sweet, baked good, usually containing flour, eggs, sugar, and either butter, cooking oil or another oil or fat.

- Cracker – typically made from flour, flavorings or seasonings such as salt, herbs, seeds, and cheese may be added to the dough or sprinkled on top before baking.

- Cheese cracker

- Pastry – a dough of flour and water and shortening that may be savoury or sweetened. Sweetened pastries are often described as bakers' confectionery.

- Pie – a baked dish which is usually made of a pastry dough casing that covers or completely contains a filling of various sweet or savoury ingredients.

- Tart – a baked dish consisting of a filling over a pastry base with an open top not covered with pastry
- Torte - a form of sweet dessert that is typically baked. Tortes differ from cakes in that cakes are made from wheat flour, but tortes, originating in Central Europe, are generally made with ground nuts instead.
- Twice-baked foods – foods that are baked twice in their preparation
- Viennoiserie – is the name given by professional chefs to describe yeast-leavened baked goods that are at a meeting point between bread and pastry. The dough is sweetened with sugar and enriched with either butter, eggs, milk or a combination of the three. There are two classes of Viennoiserie; non-laminated dough products include brioche, pandoro, and gibassier, while laminated dough products include croissant and Danish pastry.

=== By region ===
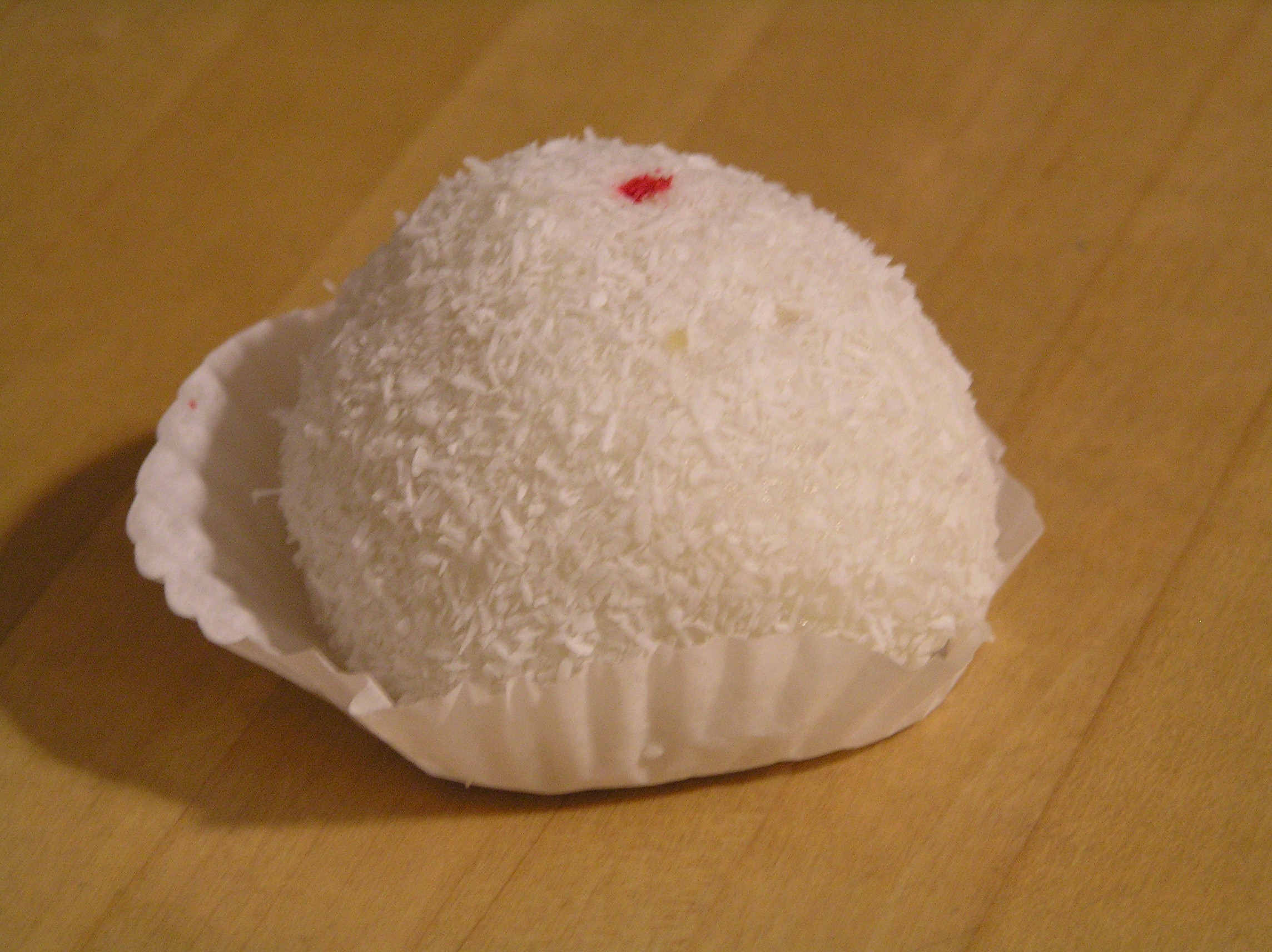
The nuomici is a Chinese pastry.

- List of American breads
- List of British breads
- List of Chinese bakery products – Chinese bakery products consist of pastries, cakes, snacks, and Chinese desserts of largely Chinese origin, though some are derived from Western baked goods.
- List of Indian breads
- Mexican breads

== See also ==
- Al forno – food that has been baked in an oven
- Bake sale
- Bakehouse (building)
- Cakery
- List of bakeries
- List of bakers
- List of bakery cafés
- Lists of foods
- Lists of prepared foods
- Pâtisserie
