= Cookie =

Small, flat and sweetened baked food

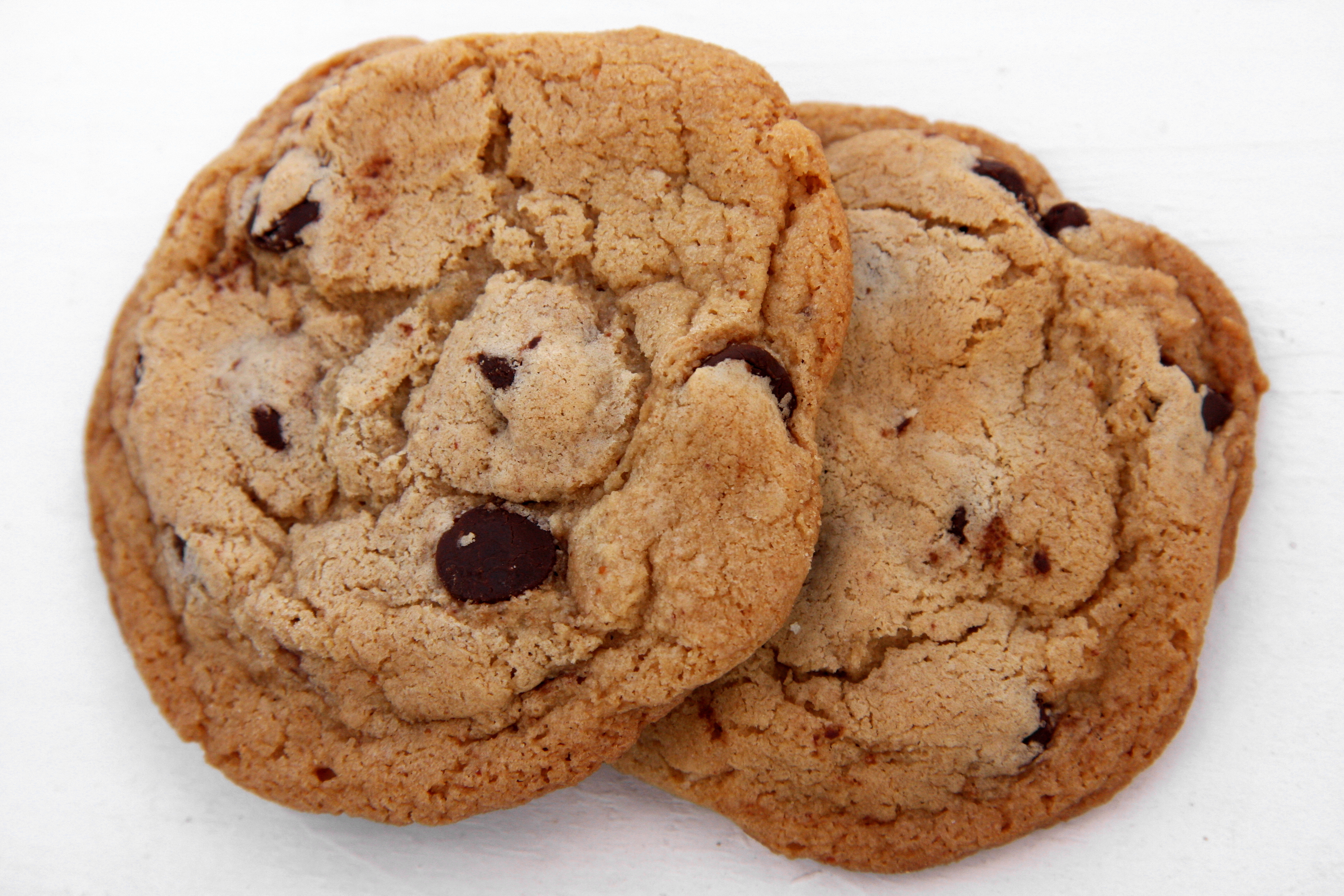
- Chocolate chip cookies
- Alternative names: Biscuit
- Course: Snack; dessert
- Place of origin: Persia, 7th century AD
- Serving temperature: Often room temperature, although they may be served when still warm from the oven

A cookie is a sweet biscuit with high sugar and fat content. Cookie dough is softer than that used for other types of biscuit, and they are cooked longer at lower temperatures. The dough typically contains flour, sugar, egg, and some type of oil or fat. It may include other ingredients such as raisins, oats, chocolate chips, or nuts. Cookie texture varies from crisp and crunchy to soft and chewy, depending on the exact combination of ingredients and methods used to create them.

People in the United States and Canada typically refer to all sweet biscuits as "cookies". People in most other English-speaking countries call crunchy cookies "biscuits" but may use the term "cookies" for chewier biscuits and for certain types, such as chocolate-chip cookies.

Cookies are often served with beverages, such as milk, coffee, or tea, and are sometimes dunked, which releases more flavour by dissolving the sugars, while also softening their texture. Factory-made cookies are sold in grocery stores, convenience stores, and vending machines. Fresh-baked cookies are sold at bakeries and coffeehouses.

== Terminology ==
In many English-speaking countries outside North America, including the United Kingdom, the most common word for a crisp cookie is "biscuit". Where biscuit is the most common term, "cookie" often only refers to one type of biscuit, a chocolate chip cookie. However, in some regions both terms are used. The container used to store cookies may be called a cookie jar.

In Scotland, the term "cookie" is sometimes used to describe a plain bun.

Cookies that are baked as a solid layer on a sheet pan and then cut, rather than being baked as individual pieces, are called bar cookies in American English or traybakes in British English.

== Etymology ==
The word cookie dates from at least 1701 in Scottish usage where the word meant "plain bun", rather than thin baked good, and so it is not certain whether it is the same word. From 1808, the word "cookie" is attested "...in the sense of "small, flat, sweet cake" in American English. The American use is derived from Dutch koekje "little cake", which is a diminutive of "koek" ("cake"), which came from the Middle Dutch word "koke" with an informal, dialect variant koekie. According to the Scottish National Dictionary, its Scottish name may derive from the diminutive form (+ suffix -ie) of the word cook, giving the Middle Scots cookie, cooky or cu(c)kie. There was much trade and cultural contact across the North Sea between the Low Countries and Scotland during the Middle Ages, which can also be seen in the history of curling and, perhaps, golf.

== Description ==
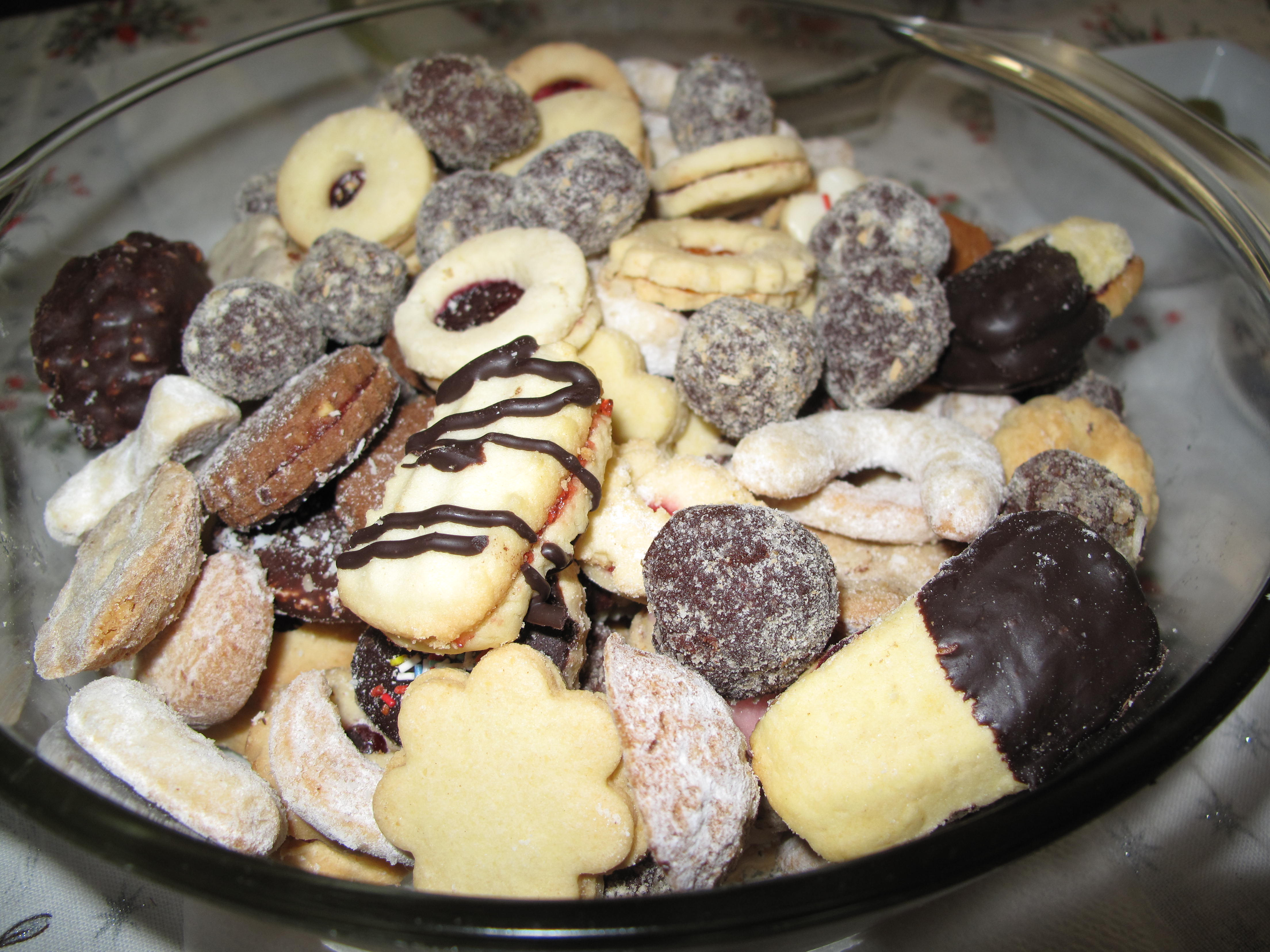
A dish of assorted cookies, including sandwich cookies filled with jam

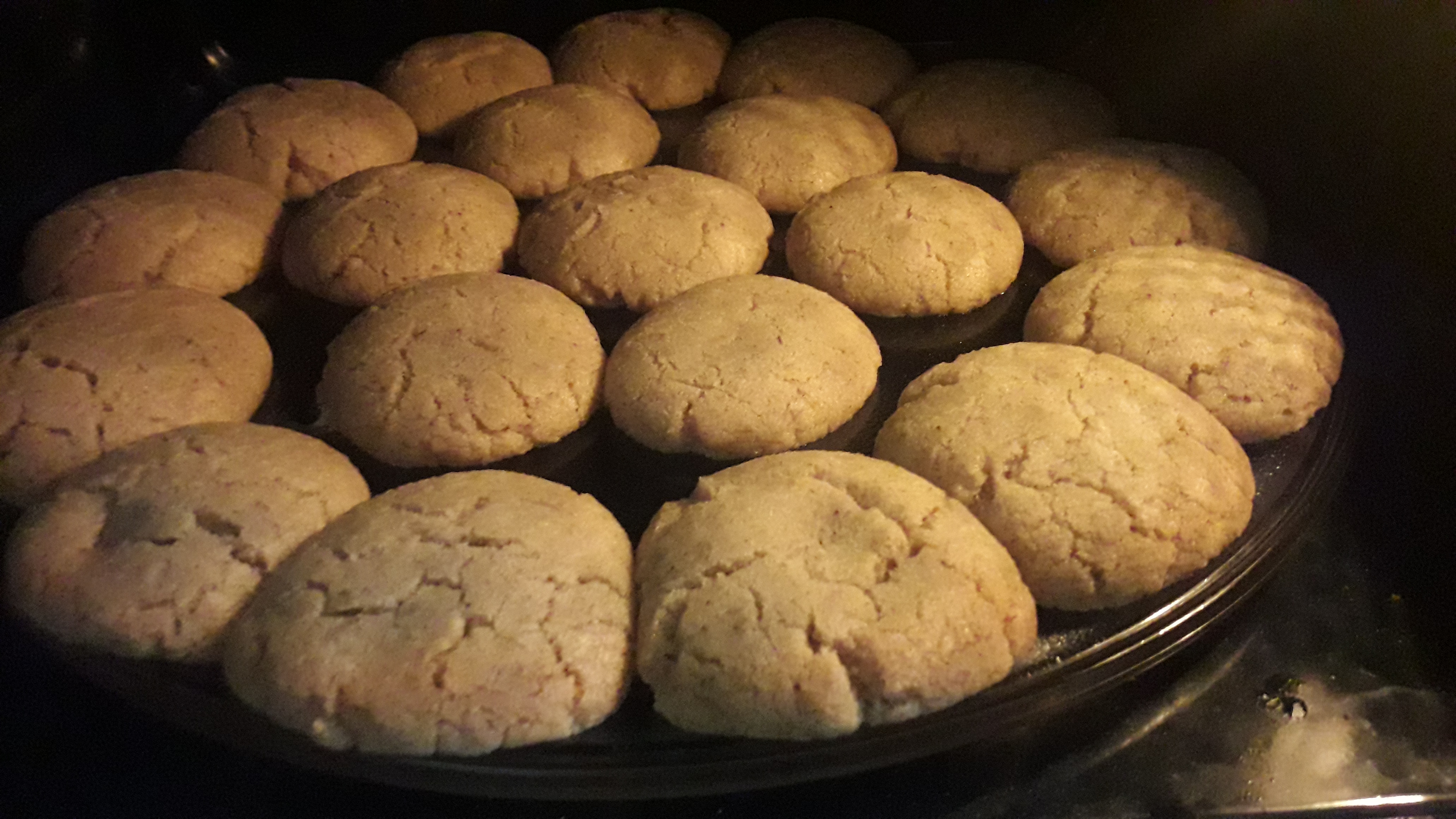
Cookies baking in an oven

Cookies are most commonly baked until crisp or else for just long enough to ensure a soft interior. Some types of cookies are not baked at all, such as varieties of peanut butter cookies that use solidified chocolate rather than set eggs and wheat gluten as a binder. Cookies are produced in a wide variety of styles, using an array of ingredients including sugars, spices, chocolate, butter, peanut butter, nuts, or dried fruits.

== History ==
Cookie-like hard wafers have existed for as long as baking has been documented, in part because they survive travel very well, but they were usually not sweet enough to be considered cookies by modern standards.

Cookies appear to have their origins in 7th century AD Persia, shortly after the use of sugar became relatively common in the region. They spread to Europe through the Muslim conquest of Spain. By the 14th century, they were common in all levels of society throughout Europe, from royal cuisine to street vendors. The first documented instance of the figure-shaped gingerbread man was at the court of Elizabeth I of England in the 16th century. She had the gingerbread figures made and presented in the likeness of some of her important guests.

With global travel becoming widespread at that time, cookies made a natural travel companion, a modernized equivalent of the travel cakes used throughout history. One of the most popular early cookies, which traveled especially well and became known on every continent by similar names, was the jumble, a relatively hard cookie made largely from nuts, sweetener, and water.

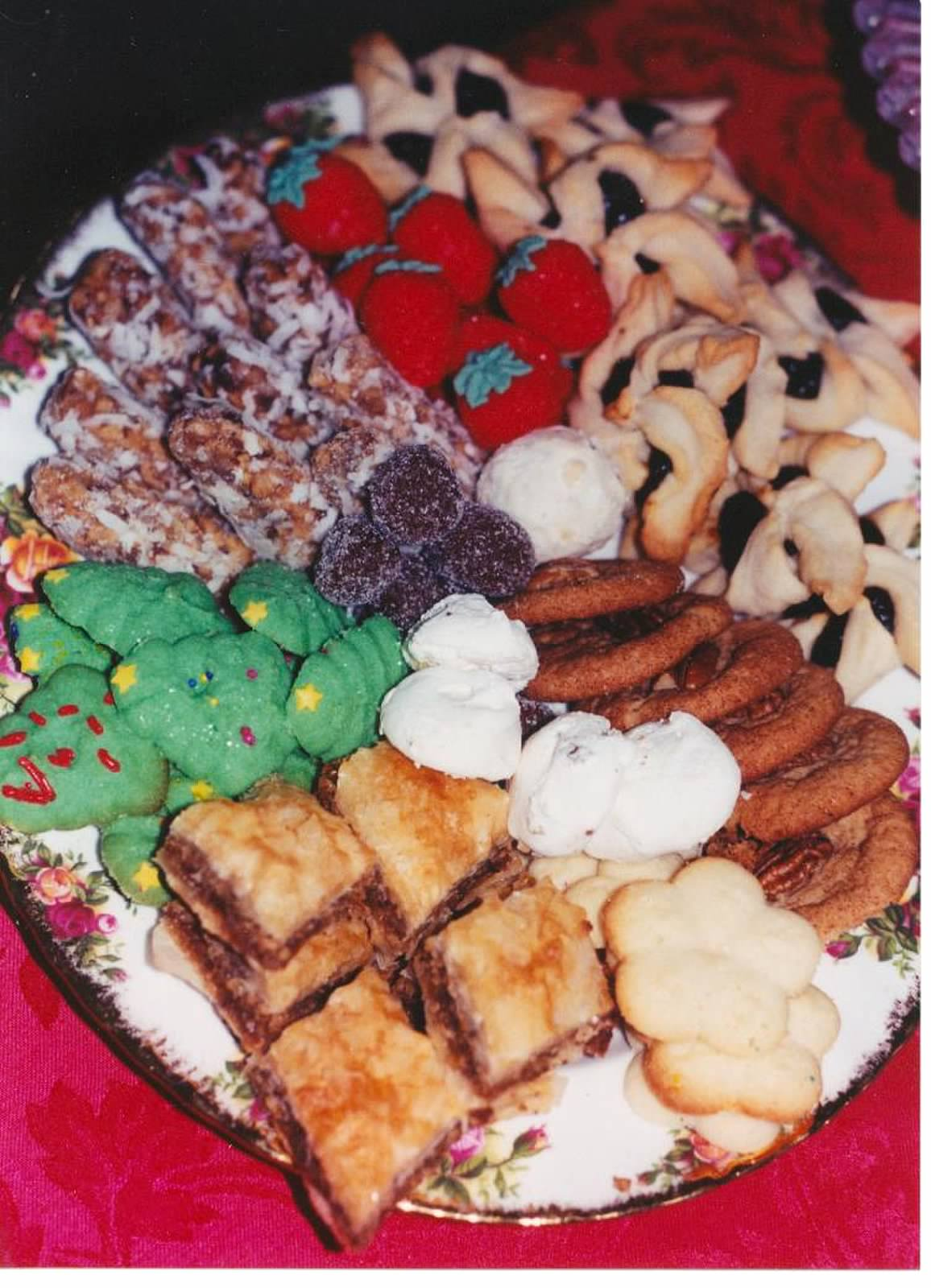
Traditional American Christmas cookie tray

Cookies came to America through the Dutch in New Amsterdam in the late 1620s. The Dutch word "koekje" was Anglicized to "cookie" or cooky. The earliest reference to cookies in America is in 1703, when "The Dutch in New York provided ... 'in 1703 ... at a funeral 800 cookies'".

The modern form of cookies, which is based on creaming butter and sugar together, did not appear commonly until the 18th century. The Industrial Revolution in Britain and the consumers it created saw cookies (biscuits) become products for the masses, and firms such as Huntley & Palmers (formed in 1822), McVitie's (formed in 1830) and Carr's (formed in 1831) were all established. The decorative biscuit tin, invented by Huntley & Palmers in 1831, saw British cookies exported around the world. In 1891, Cadbury filed a patent for a chocolate-coated cookie.

== Classification ==
Cookies are broadly classified according to how they are formed or made, including at least these categories:

- Bar cookies consist of batter or other ingredients that are poured or pressed into a pan (sometimes in multiple layers) and cut into cookie-sized pieces after baking. In British English, bar cookies are known as "tray bakes". Examples include brownies, fruit squares, and bars such as date squares.

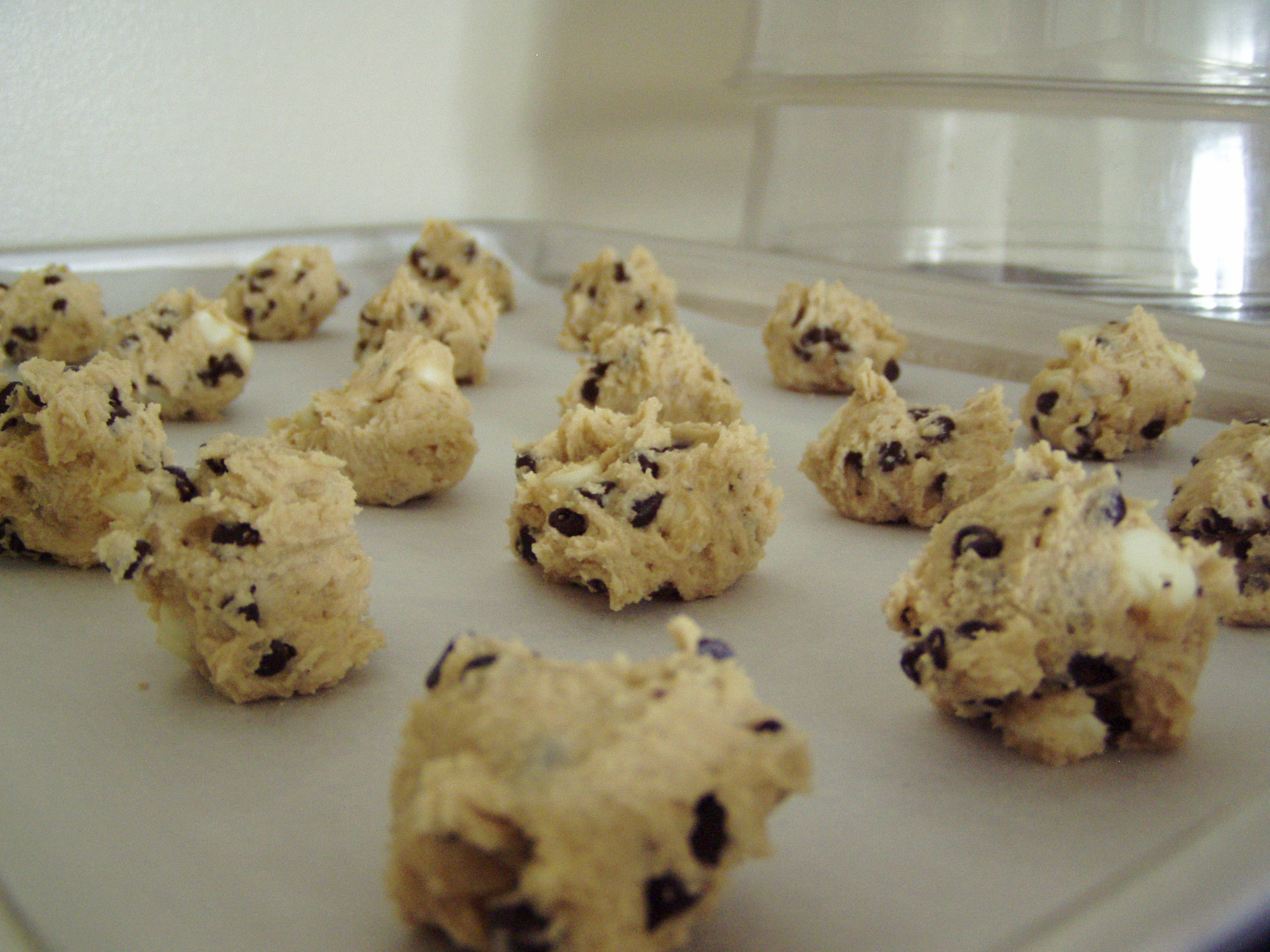
Drop cookie dough ready to be put in the oven

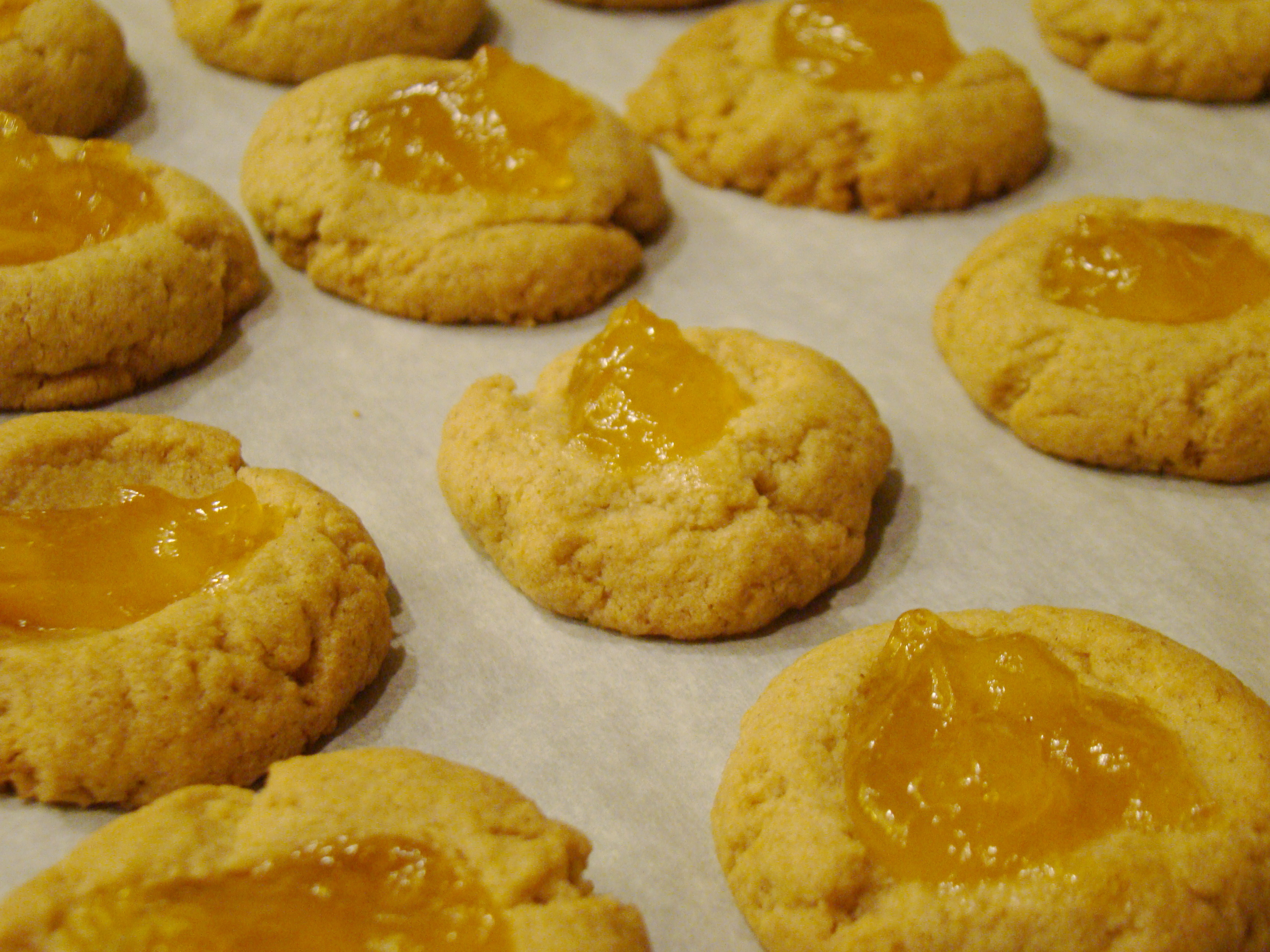
Thumbprint cookies

- Drop cookies are made from a relatively soft dough that is dropped by spoonfuls onto the baking sheet. During baking, the mounds of dough spread and flatten. Chocolate chip cookies (Toll House cookies), oatmeal raisin (or other oatmeal-based) cookies, and rock cakes are popular examples of drop cookies. This may also include thumbprint cookies, for which a small central depression is created with a thumb or small spoon before baking to contain a filling, such as jam or a chocolate chip. In the UK, the term "cookie" often refers only to this particular type of product.
- Filled cookies are made from a rolled cookie dough filled with a fruit, jam or confectionery filling before baking. Hamantashen are a filled cookie.
- Molded cookies are also made from a stiffer dough that is molded into balls or cookie shapes by hand before baking. Snickerdoodles and peanut butter cookies are examples of molded cookies. Some cookies, such as hermits or biscotti, are molded into large flattened loaves that are later cut into smaller cookies.
- No-bake cookies are made by mixing a filler, such as cereal or nuts, into a melted confectionery binder, shaping into cookies or bars, and allowing to cool or harden. Oatmeal clusters and rum balls are no-bake cookies.
- Pressed cookies are made from a soft dough that is extruded from a cookie press into various decorative shapes before baking. Spritzgebäck is an example of a pressed cookie.
- Refrigerator cookies (also known as icebox cookies) are made from a stiff dough that is refrigerated to make the raw dough even stiffer before cutting and baking. The dough is typically shaped into cylinders which are sliced into round cookies before baking. Pinwheel cookies and those made by Pillsbury are representative.

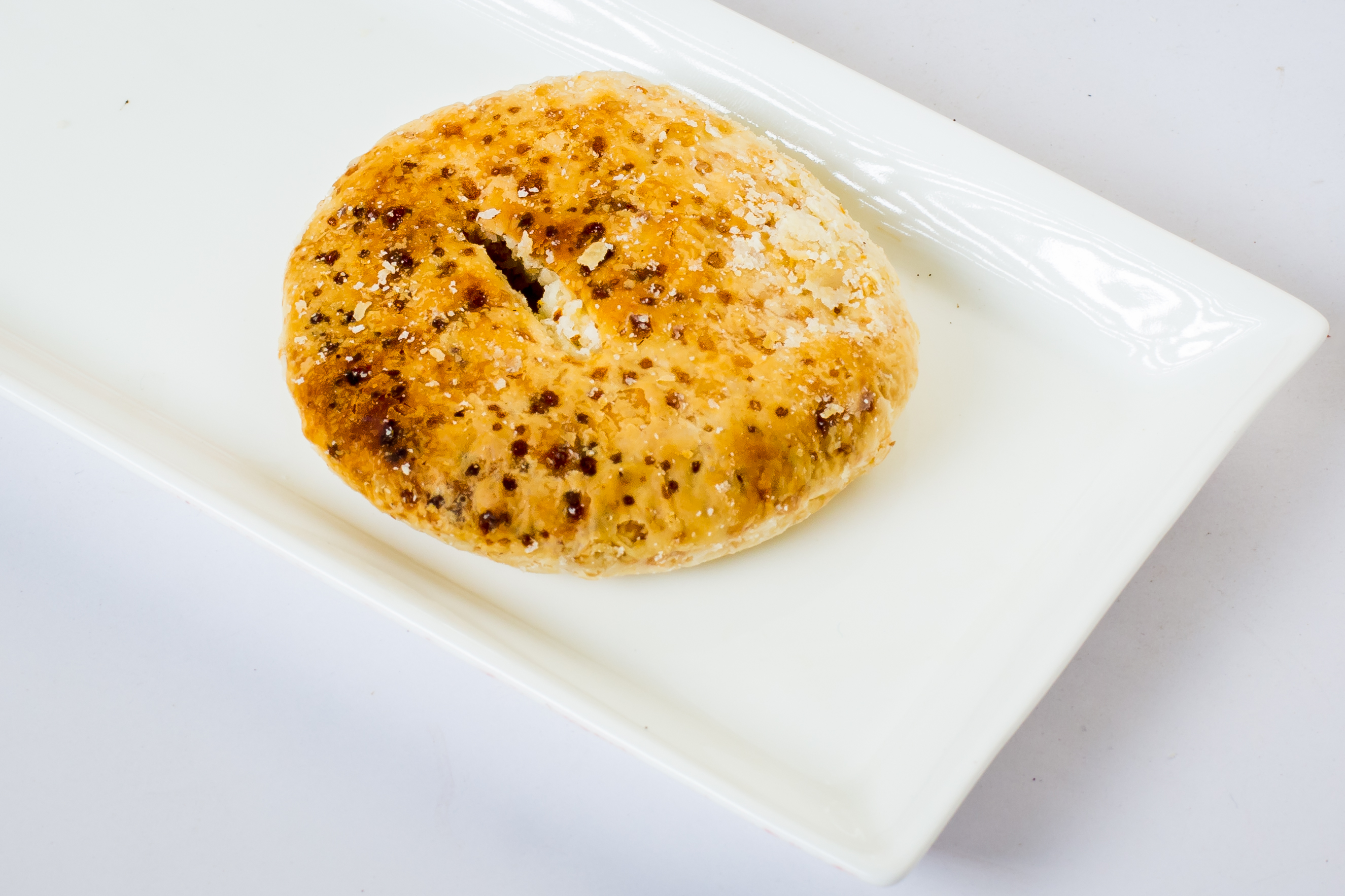
The Bakarkhani flatbread cookie is part of Mughlai cuisine of the Indian subcontinent.

- Rolled cookies are made from a stiffer dough that is rolled out and cut into shapes with a cookie cutter. Gingerbread men are an example.
- Sandwich cookies are rolled or pressed cookies that are assembled as a sandwich with a sweet filling. Fillings include marshmallow, jam, and icing. The Oreo cookie, made of two chocolate cookies with a vanilla icing filling, is an example.

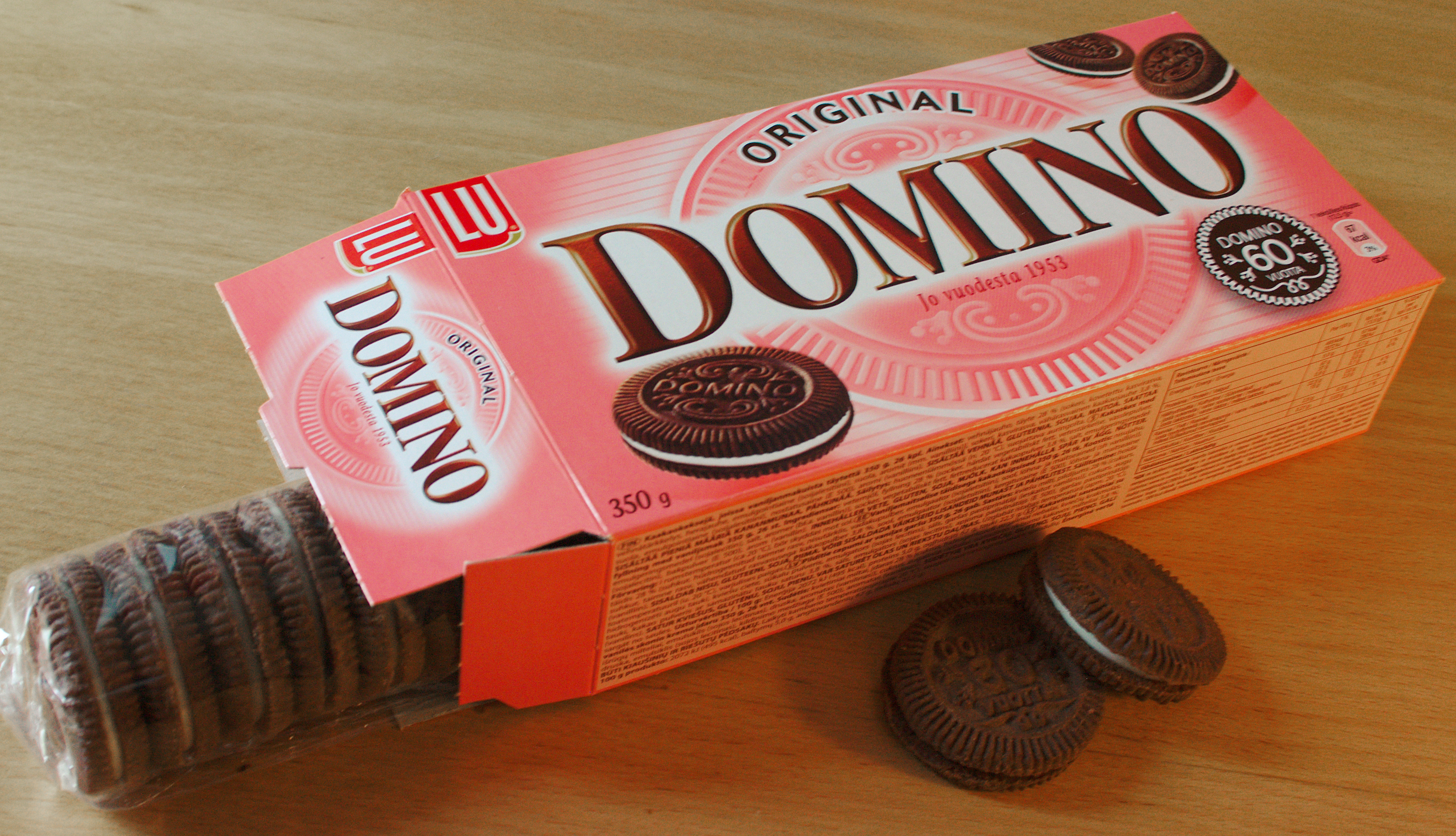
A pack of Finnish Domino cookies

Other types of cookies are classified for other reasons, such as their ingredients, size, or intended time of serving:

- Breakfast cookies are typically larger, lower-sugar cookies filled with "heart-healthy nuts and fiber-rich oats" that are eaten as a quick breakfast snack.
- Lactation cookies are cookies that are said to stimulate a breastfeeding parent's milk production.
- Low-fat cookies or diet cookies typically have lower fat than regular cookies.
- Raw cookie dough is served in some restaurants, though the eggs may be omitted since the dough is eaten raw, which could pose a salmonella risk if eggs were used. Cookie Dough Confections in New York City is a restaurant that has a range of raw cookie dough flavors, which are scooped into cups for customers like ice cream.
- Skillet cookies are big cookies baked in a cast-iron skillet and served warm. They are either eaten straight from the pan or cut into wedges, often with vanilla ice cream on top.
- Supersized cookies are large cookies such as the Panera Kitchen Sink Cookie. These very large cookies are sold at grocery stores, restaurants and coffeeshops.
- Vegan cookies can be made with flour, sugar, nondairy milk, and nondairy margarine. Aquafaba icing can be used to decorate the cookies.
- Cookie cakes are made in a larger circular shape usually with writing made of frosting.

== Reception ==
Leah Ettman from Nutrition Action has criticized the high-calorie count and fat content of supersized cookies; she cites the Panera Kitchen Sink Cookie, a supersized chocolate chip cookie, which measures 5 1/2 inches in diameter and has 800 calories. For busy people who eat breakfast cookies in the morning, Kate Bratskeir from the Huffington Post recommends lower-sugar cookies filled with "heart-healthy nuts and fiber-rich oats". A book on nutrition by Paul Insel et al. notes that "low-fat" or "diet cookies" may have the same number of calories as regular cookies, due to added sugar.

== In popular culture ==
There are a number of slang usages of the term "cookie". The slang use of "cookie" to mean a person, "especially an attractive woman" is attested to in print since 1920. The catchphrase "that's the way the cookie crumbles", which means "that's just the way things happen" is attested to in print in 1955. Other slang terms include "smart cookie" and "tough cookie." According to The Cambridge International Dictionary of Idioms, a smart cookie is "someone who is clever and good at dealing with difficult situations." The word "cookie" has been vulgar slang for "vagina" in the US since 1970. The word "cookies" is used to refer to the contents of the stomach, often in reference to vomiting (e.g., "pop your cookies", a 1960s expression, or "toss your cookies", a 1970s expression). The expression "cookie cutter", in addition to referring literally to a culinary device used to cut rolled cookie dough into shapes, is also used metaphorically to refer to items or things "having the same configuration or look as many others" (e.g., a "cookie cutter tract house") or to label something as "stereotyped or formulaic" (e.g., an action movie filled with "generic cookie cutter characters"). "Cookie duster" is a whimsical expression for a mustache. Soggy biscuit or ookie cookie is a game wherein multiple men will simultaneously masturbate around a cookie and the last person to ejaculate onto it is forced to eat it.

Cookie Monster is a Muppet on the children's television show Sesame Street. He is best known for his voracious appetite for cookies and his famous eating phrases, such as "Me want cookie!", "Me eat cookie!" (or simply "COOKIE!"), and "Om nom nom nom" (said through a mouth full of food).

Cookie Clicker is a game where players click a cookie to buy upgrades to make more cookies.

== Notable varieties ==
- Alfajor
- Angel Wings (Chruściki)
- Animal cracker
- Anzac biscuit
- Berger cookie
- Berner Haselnusslebkuchen
- Biscotti
- Biscuit rose de Reims
- Black and white cookie
- Blondie
- Bourbon biscuit
- Brookie
- Brownie
- Butter cookie
- Chocolate chip cookie
- Chocolate-coated marshmallow treat
- Congo bar
- Digestive biscuit
- Fat rascal
- Fattigmann
- Flies graveyard
- Florentine biscuit
- Fortune cookie
- Fruit squares and bars (date, fig, lemon, raspberry, etc.)
- Ginger snap
- Gingerbread house
- Gingerbread man
- Graham cracker
- Hamentash
- Hobnob biscuit
- Joe Frogger
- Jumble
- Kifli
- Koulourakia
- Krumkake
- Linzer cookie
- Macaroon
- Meringue
- Nice biscuit
- Oatmeal raisin cookie
- Pastelito
- Peanut butter blossom cookie
- Peanut butter cookie
- Pepparkakor
- Pfeffernüsse
- Pizzelle
- Polvorón
- Qurabiya
- Rainbow cookie
- Ranger Cookie
- Rich tea
- Riposteria
- Rosette
- Rum ball
- Rusk
- Russian tea cake
- Rock cake
- Sablé
- Sandbakelse
- Şekerpare
- Shortbread
- Snickerdoodle
- Speculoos
- Springerle
- Spritzgebäck (Spritz)
- Stroopwafel
- Sugar cookie
- Tea biscuit
- Toruń gingerbread
- Tuile
- Wafer
- Windmill cookie

== Gallery ==
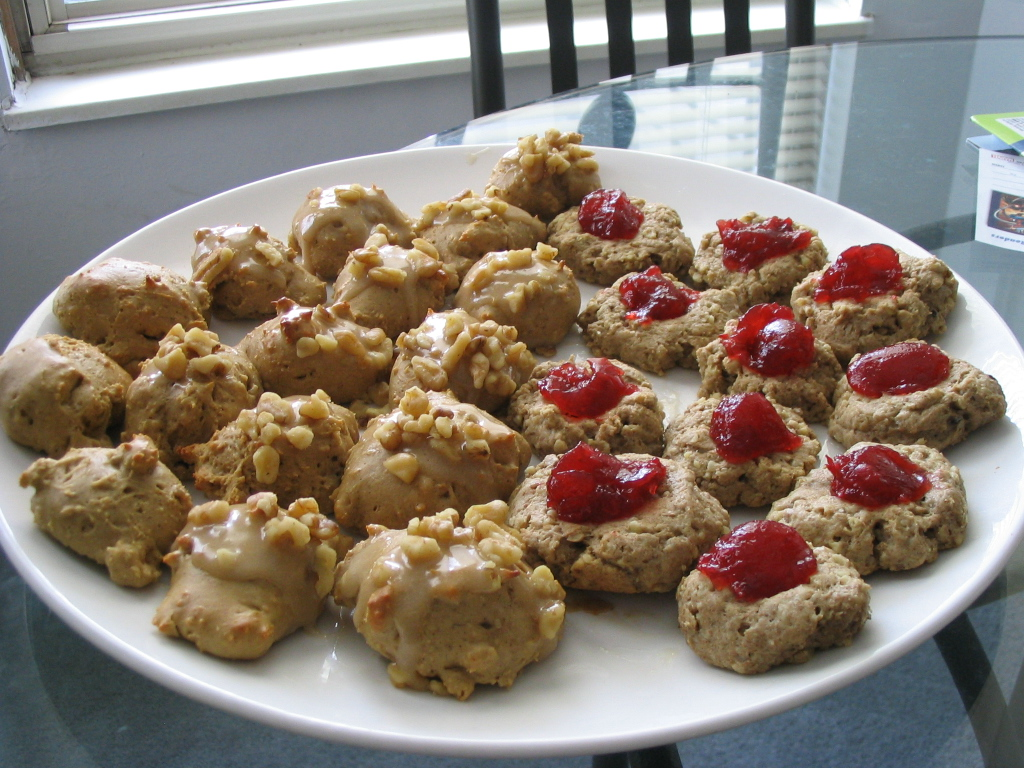
A variety of Maple spice cookies and thumbprint cookies

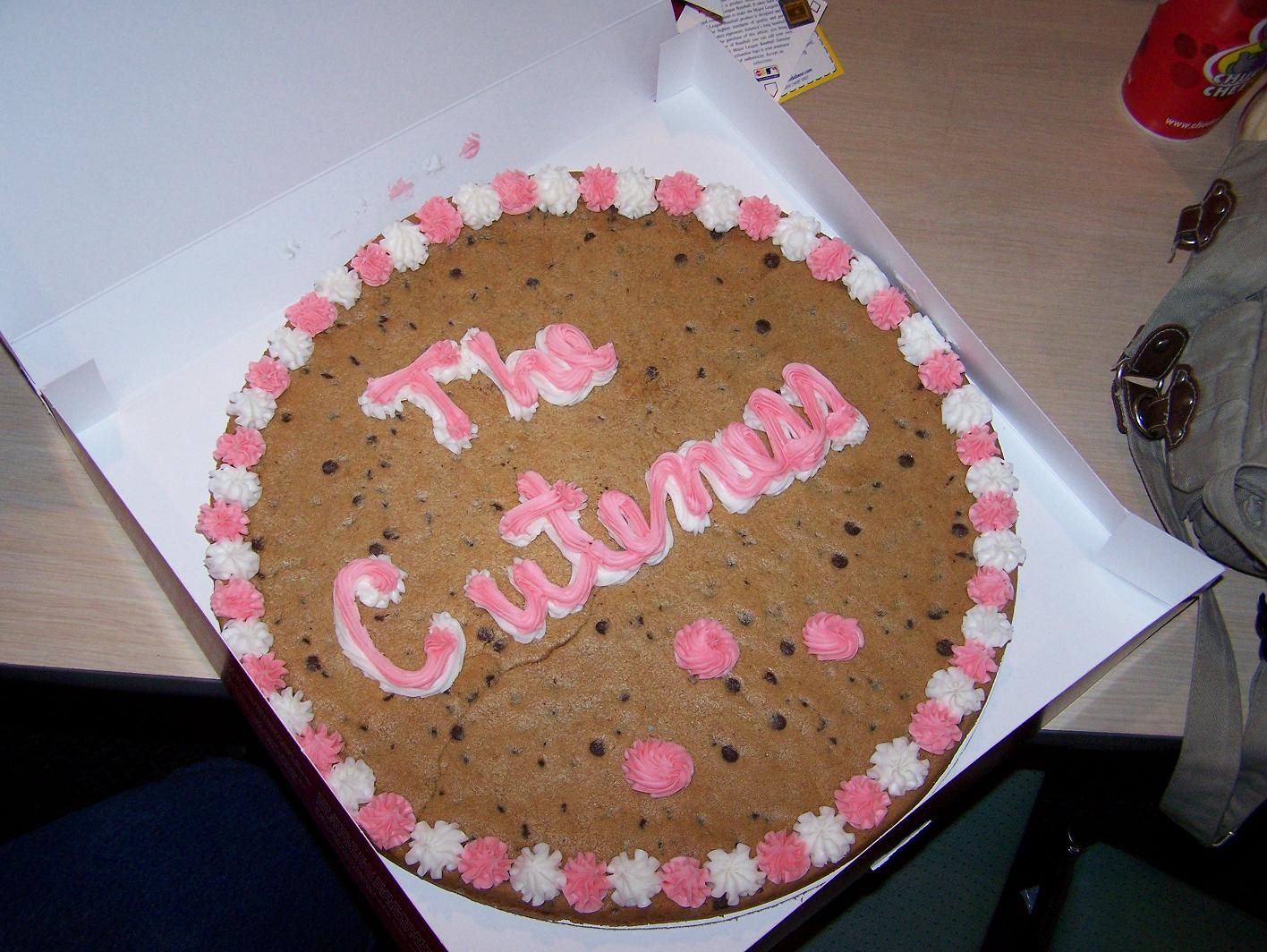
A cookie cake is a large cookie that can be decorated with icing or fondant like a cake. This is made by Mrs. Fields.

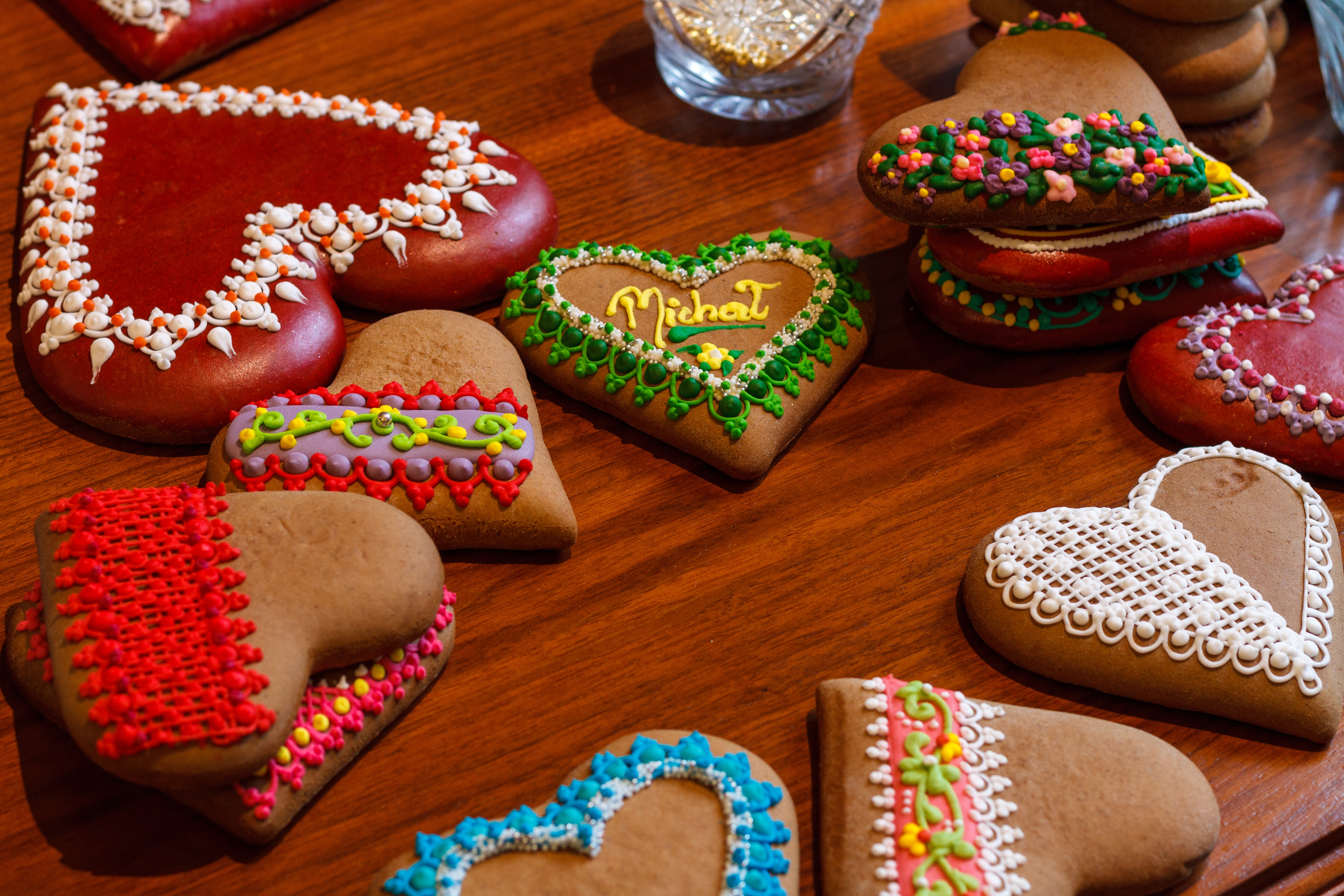
Hearts shaped Valentine's Day cookies adorned with icing

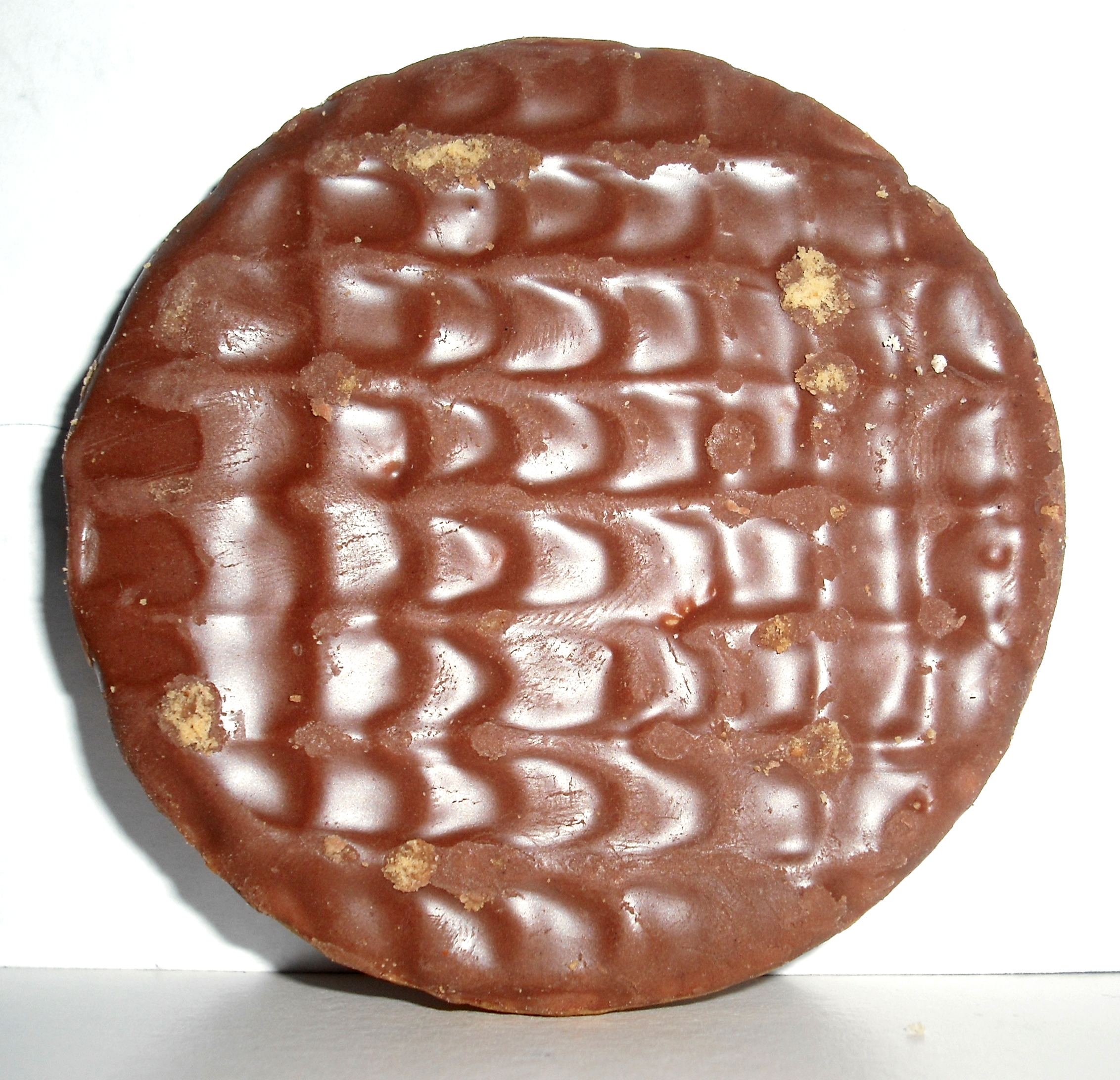
A McVitie's chocolate digestive, a popular biscuit to dunk in tea/coffee in the UK

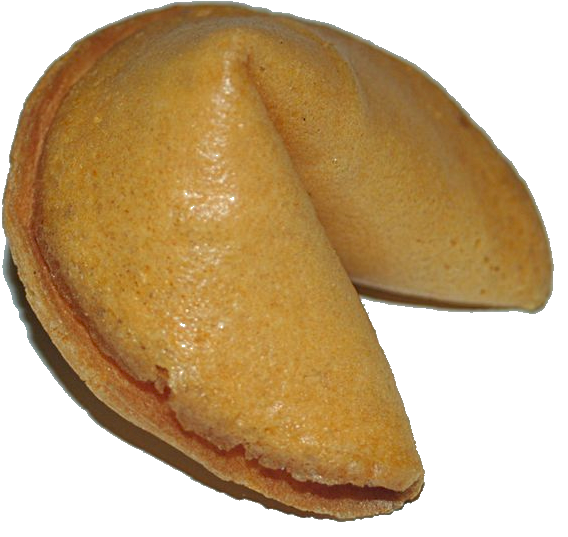
A fortune cookie

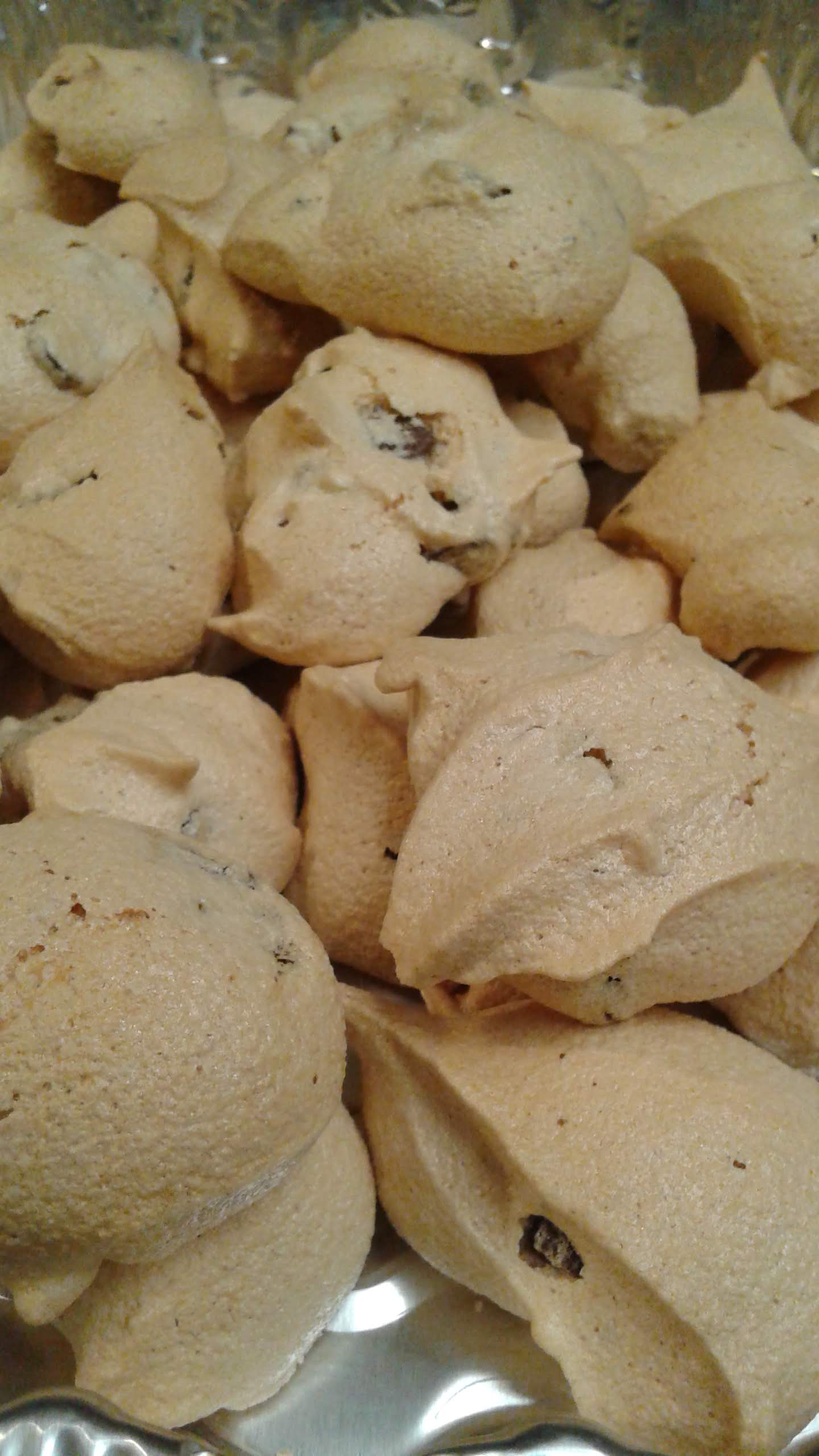
Meringue cookies

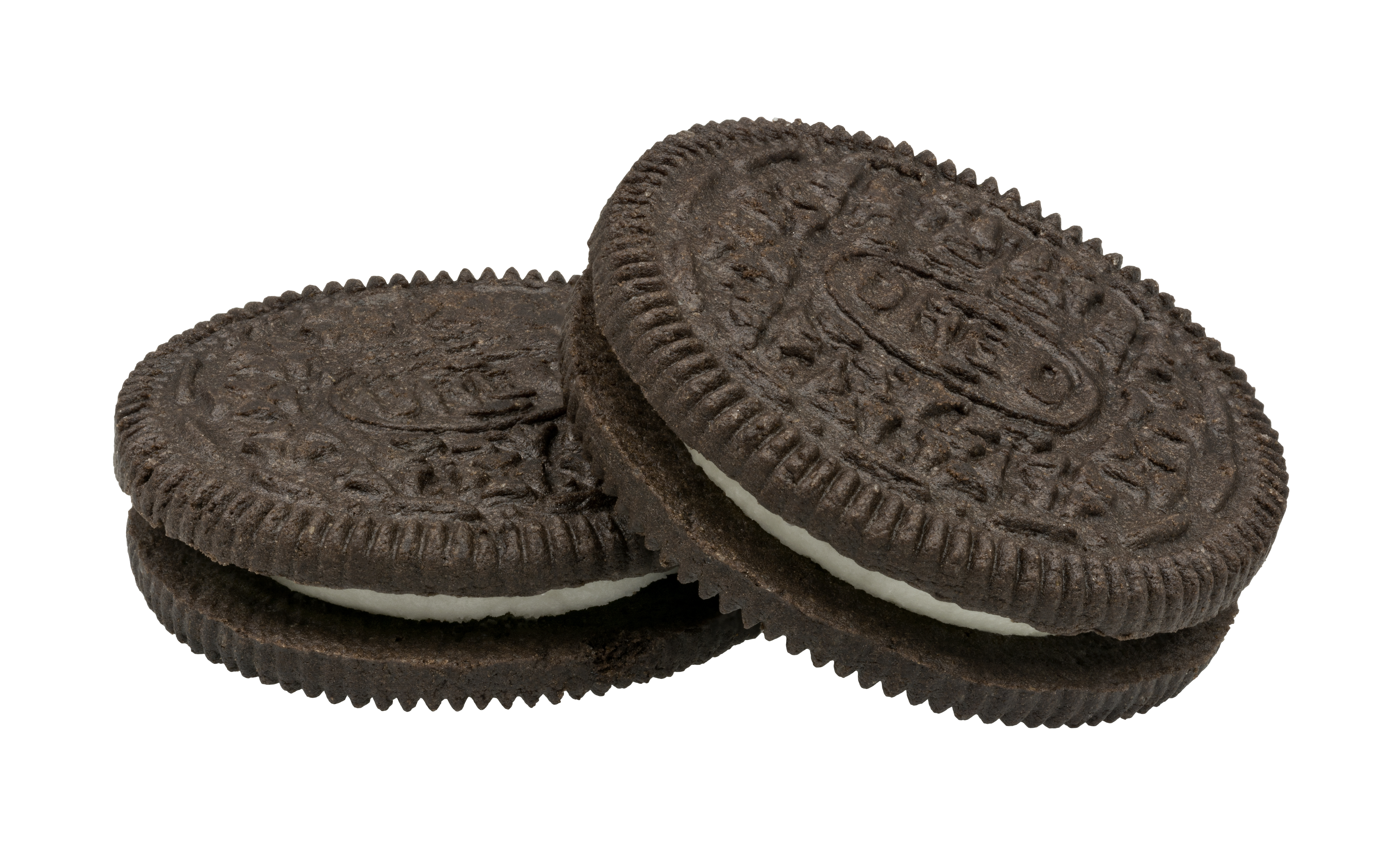
Commercially sold Oreo cookies

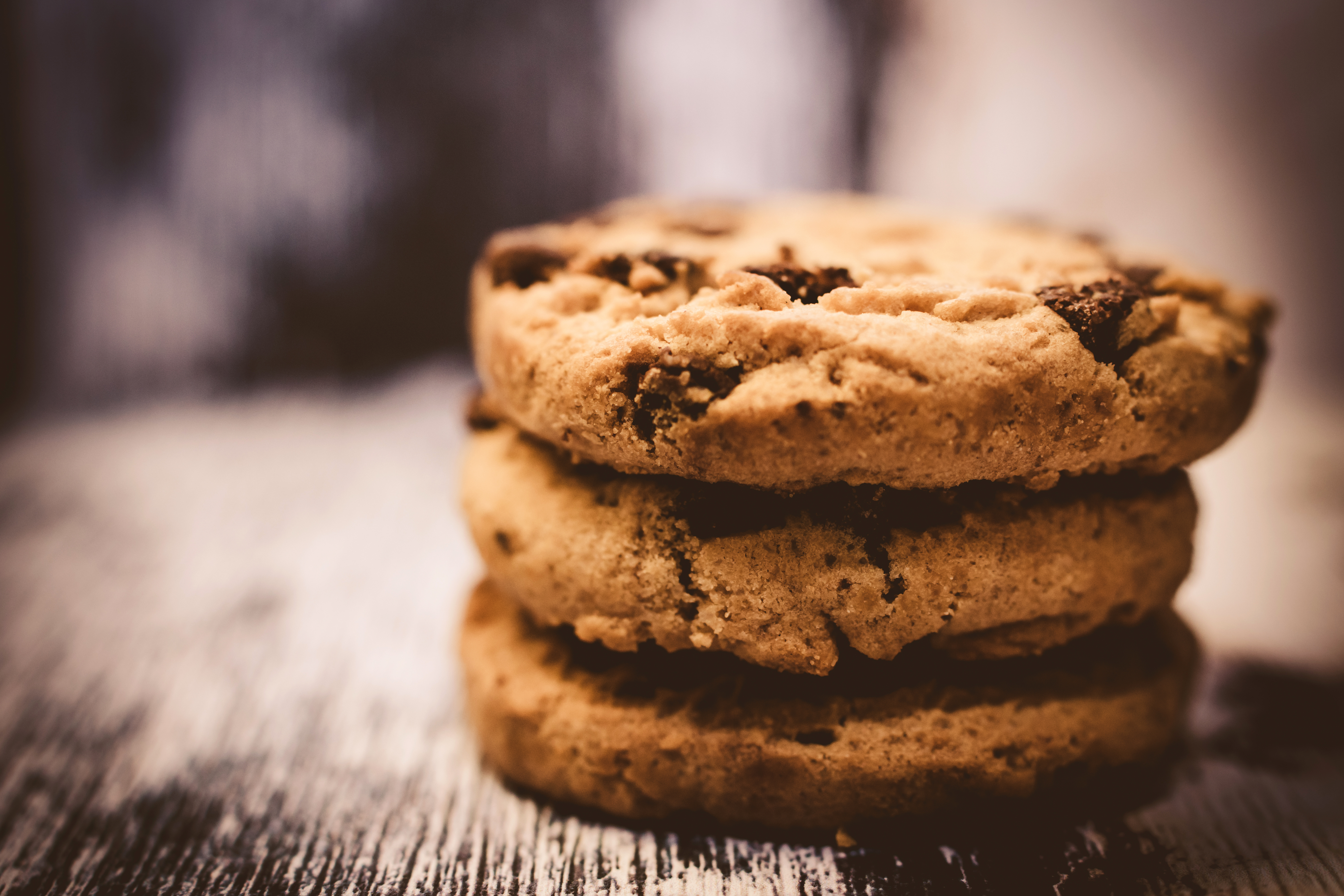
Choc-chip cookies

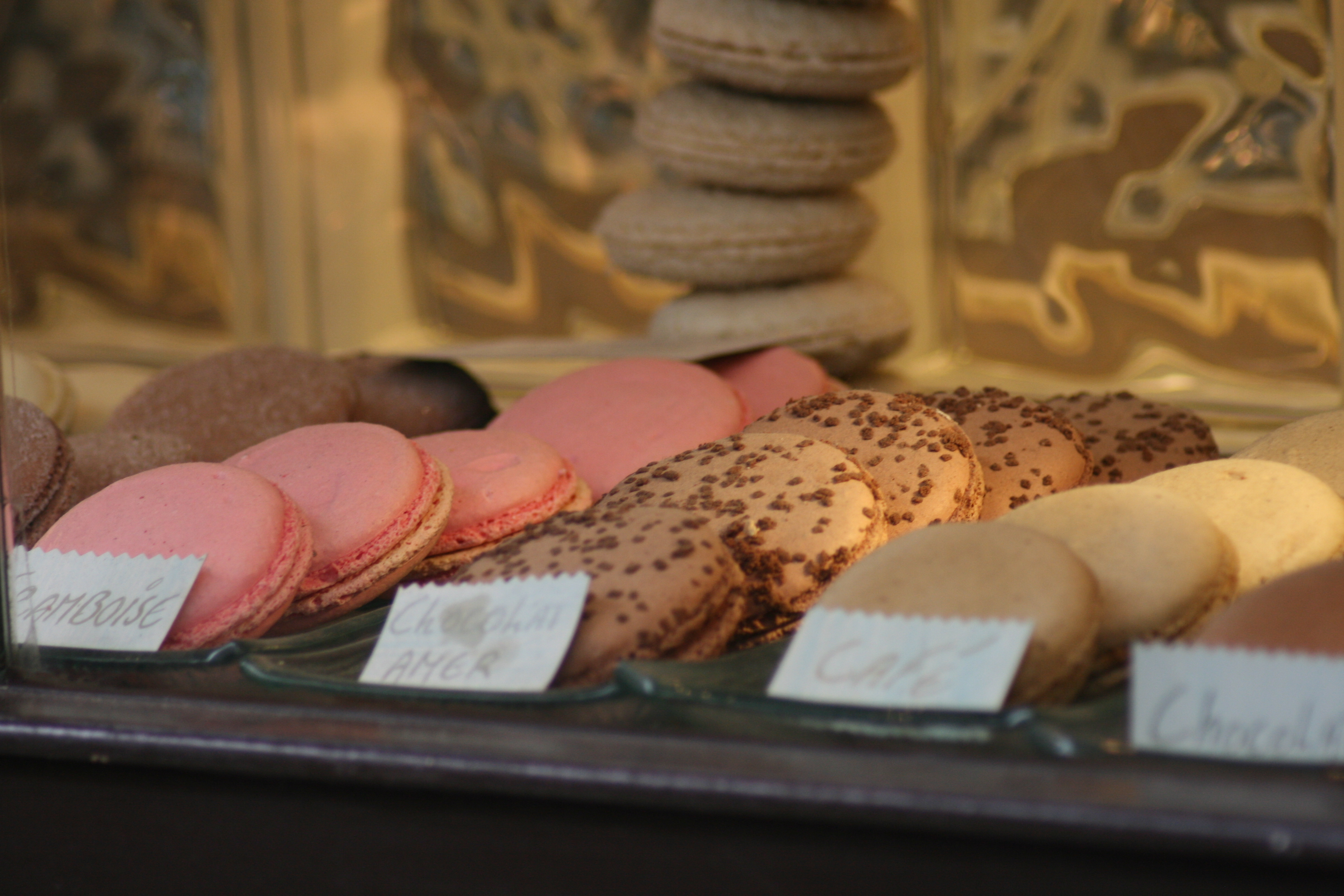
A cookie shop, filled with a wide range of cookies

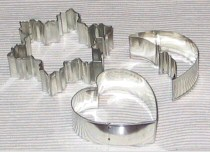
Cookie cutters

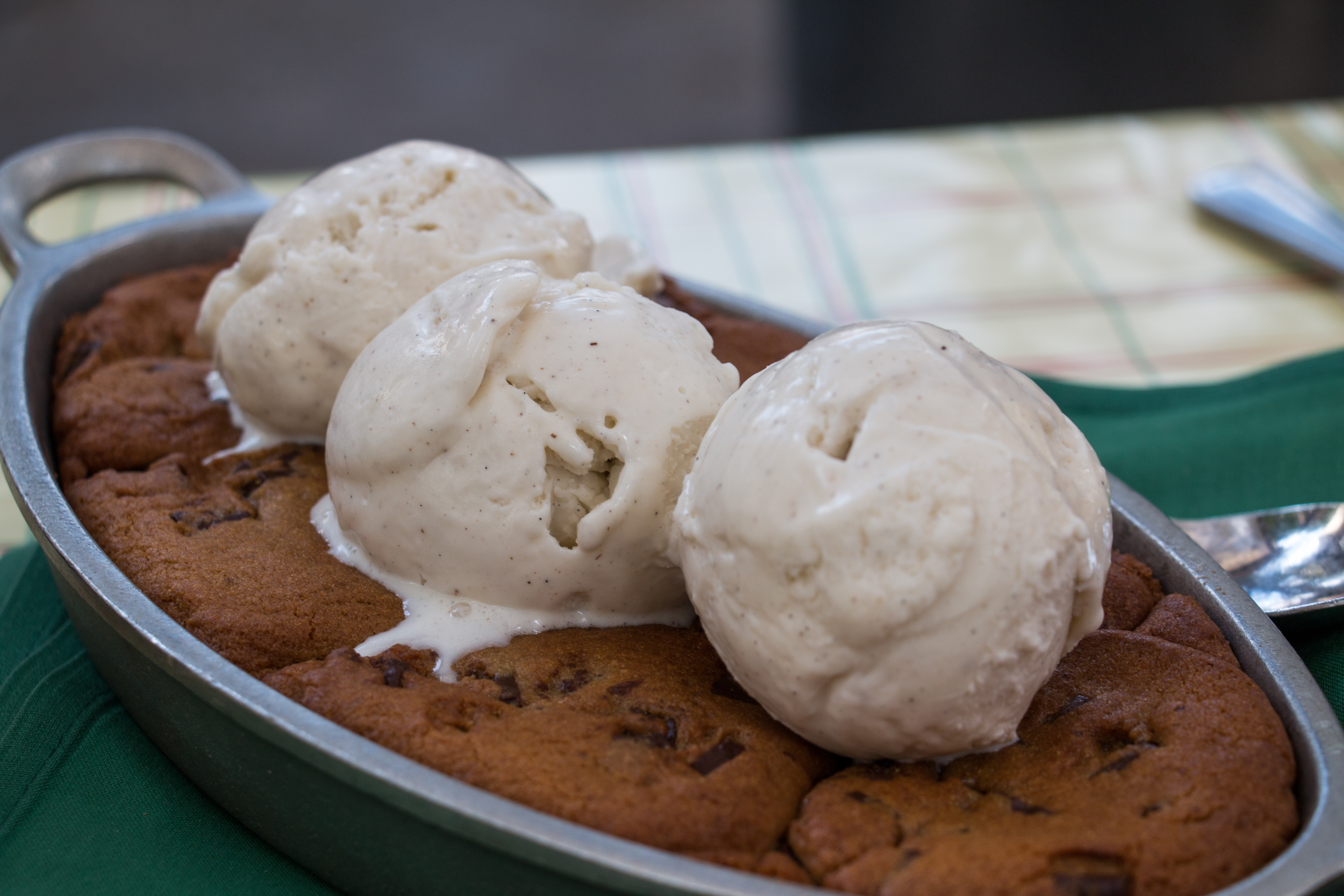
A cookie dessert, topped with ice cream

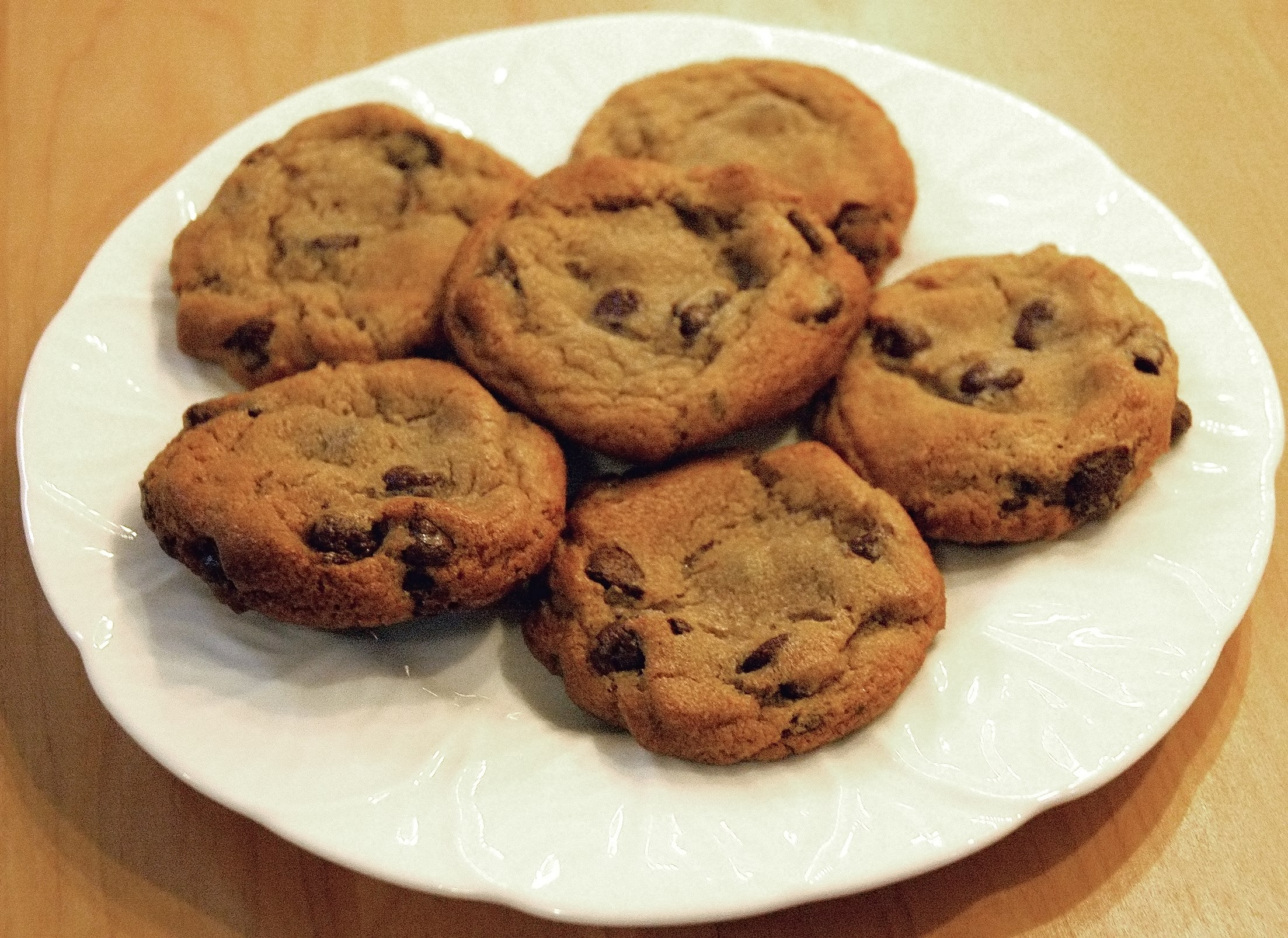
A plate of chocolate chip cookies

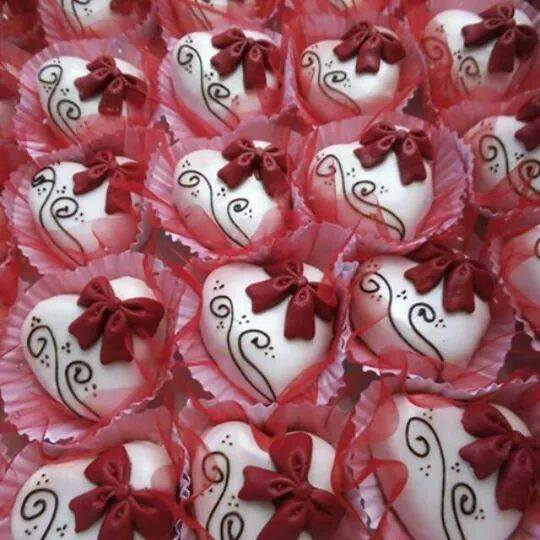
Algerian cookies

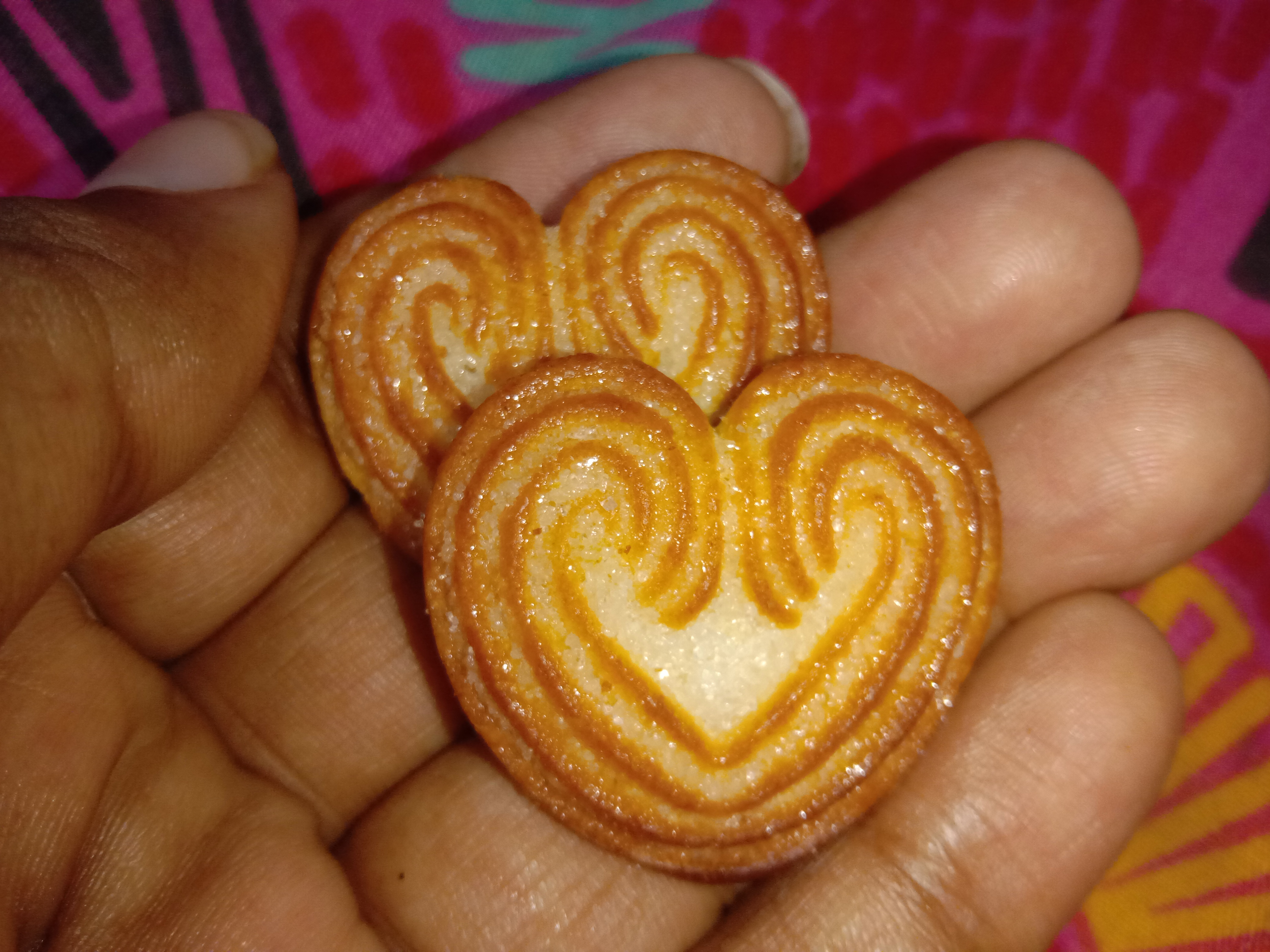
Little heart-shaped cookies from India

== Related pastries and confections ==
- Acıbadem kurabiyesi
- Animal crackers
- Berliner (pastry)
- Bun
- Candy
- Cake
- Churro
- Cracker (food)
- Cupcake
- Danish pastry
- Doughnut
- Funnel cake
- Galette
- Graham cracker
- Hershey's Cookies 'n' Creme
- Kit Kat
- Halvah
- Ladyfinger (biscuit)
- Lebkuchen
- Mille-feuille
- Marzipan
- Mille-feuille (Napoleon)
- Moon pie
- Pastry
- Palmier
- Petit four
- Rum ball
- S'more
- Snack cake
- Tartlet
- Teacake
- Teething biscuit
- Whoopie pie

== Manufacturers ==
- Arnott's Biscuits
- Bahlsen
- Burton's Foods
- D.F. Stauffer Biscuit Company
- DeBeukelaer
- Famous Amos (division of Ferrero)
- Fazer
- Fox's Biscuits
- Interbake Foods
- Jules Destrooper
- Keebler
- Lance
- Lotte Confectionery (division of Lotte)
- Lotus Bakeries
- McKee Foods
- Meiji Seika Kaisha Ltd.
- Mrs. Fields
- Nabisco (division of Mondelēz International)
- Nestlé
- Northern Foods
- Otis Spunkmeyer (division of Aryzta)
- Pillsbury (division of General Mills)
- Pinnacle Foods
- Pepperidge Farm (division of Campbell's)
- Royal Dansk (division of Kelsen Group)
- Sunshine Biscuits (historical)
- United Biscuits
- Walkers Shortbread
- Utz Brands

== Product lines and brands ==
- Animal Crackers (Nabisco, Keebler, Cadbury, Bahlsen, others)
- Anna's (Lotus)
- Archway Cookies (Lance)
- Barnum's Animals (Nabisco)
- Betty Crocker (General Mills, cookie mixes)
- Biscoff (Lotus)
- Chips Ahoy! (Nabisco)
- Chips Deluxe (Keebler)
- Danish Butter Cookies (Royal Dansk)
- Duncan Hines (Pinnacle, cookie mixes)
- Famous Amos (Kellogg)
- Fig Newton (Nabisco)
- Fox's Biscuits (Northern)
- Fudge Shoppe (Keebler)
- Girl Scout cookie (Keebler, Interbake)
- Hello Panda (Meiji)
- Hit (Bahlsen)
- Hydrox (Sunshine, discontinued by Keebler)
- Jaffa Cakes (McVitie)
- Jammie Dodgers (United)
- Koala's March (Lotte)
- Leibniz-Keks (Bahlsen)
- Little Debbie (McKee)
- Lorna Doone (Nabisco)
- Maryland Cookies (Burton's)
- McVitie's (United)
- Milano (Pepperidge Farm)
- Nilla Wafers (Nabisco)
- Nutter Butter (Nabisco)
- Oreo (Nabisco)
- Pillsbury (General Mills, cookie mixes)
- Pecan Sandies (Keebler)
- Peek Freans (United)
- Pirouline (DeBeukelaer)
- Stauffer's (Meiji)
- Stella D'Oro (Lance)
- Sunshine (Keebler)
- Teddy Grahams (Nabisco)
- Toll House (Nestle)
- Tim Tam (Arnott's)
- Vienna Fingers (Keebler)

== Miscellaneous ==
- Christmas cookie
- Cookie cutter
- Cookie dough
- Cookie Clicker
- Cookie Monster
- Cookie sheet
- Cookie table
- Cookies and cream
- Girl Scout cookie

== See also ==
- List of baked goods
- List of cookies
  - List of shortbread biscuits and cookies
- List of desserts
