= Sizzling brownie =

Indian dessert

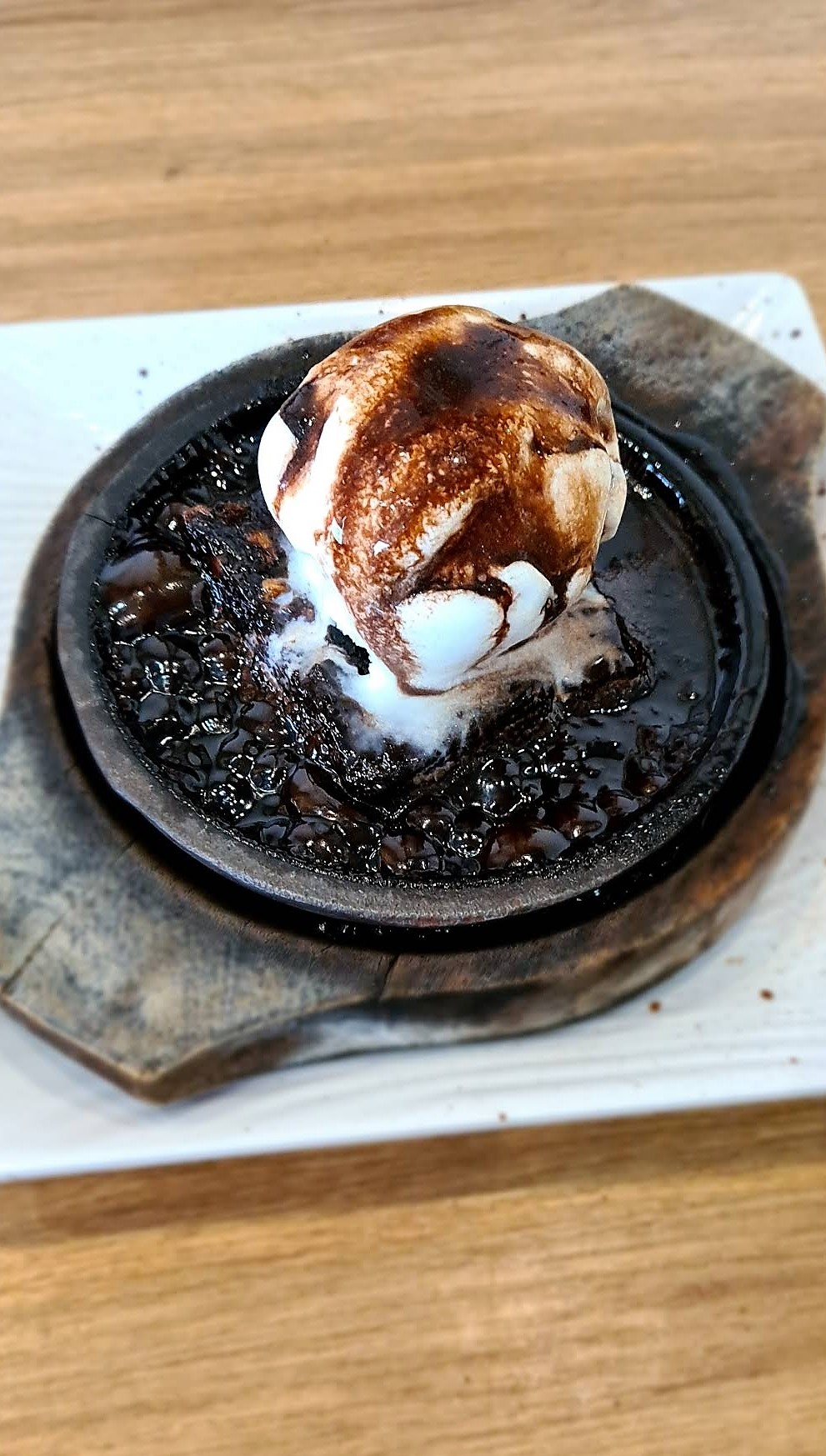
A sizzling brownie

Sizzling brownie is a dessert originating from India, made popular by cafes and restaurants of Mumbai, Kolkata, Kerala and Bihar. It is a chocolate brownie with a scoop of ice cream on top served with a generous pouring of melted chocolate on the ice-cream. It is served on hot sizzler plates to be eaten directly in its sizzling hot form.

== Preparation ==
Generally, a plain or walnut chocolate brownie, a scoop of ice cream (mostly vanilla) and melted dark chocolate are used as the main ingredients in the preparation of this dessert. The ingredients are assembled on top of one another; on an extremely hot dish or skillet, for the brownie to undergo the signature "sizzling" effect. The final garnish is optional; and includes either chocolate chips or nuts. Other nut-based brownies and ice cream flavours are also used in certain food joints. Gooey chocolate brownies are also used with seasonal fruits on the sides to create variants of sizzling brownies.

== See also ==
- List of desserts
