= Fifteens =

Northern Irish unbaked sweet

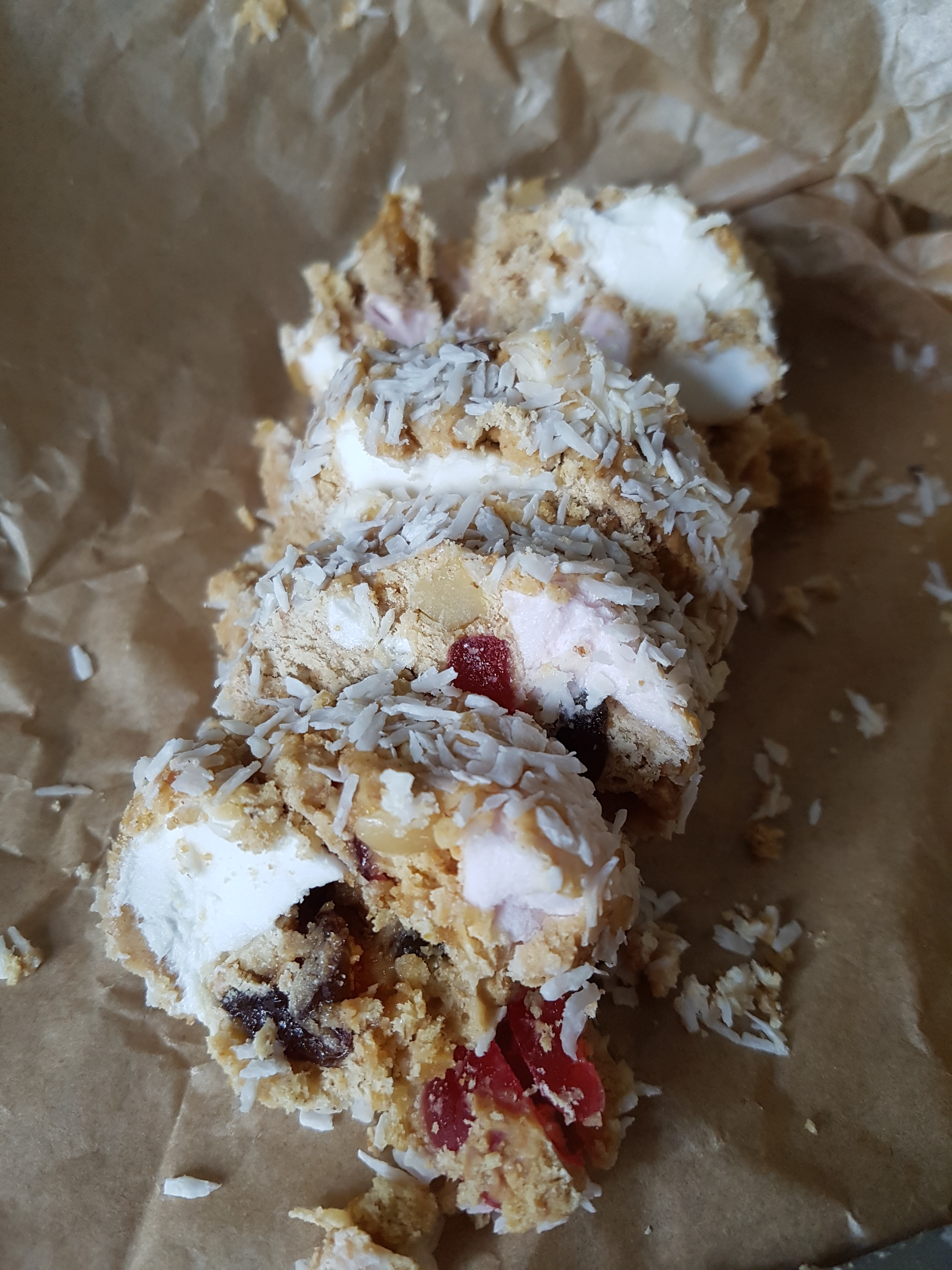
A fresh batch of Fifteens, ready for serving

Fifteens are a type of tray bake from Ulster. The recipe's name derives from the fact that a set of fifteen buns is typically made with 15 digestive biscuits, 15 marshmallows and 15 glacé cherries, which are combined with condensed milk and desiccated coconut.

The confection is traditionally offered with other tray bakes, buns or biscuits and is commonly eaten with a cup of tea. Fifteens are rarely found outside Northern Ireland and County Donegal.
