= Brookie (food) =

Brownie and cookie hybrid

- A homemade brookie
- Type: Hybrid dessert
- Course: Dessert
- Main ingredients: Flour, butter, eggs, cocoa powder, sugar

A brookie is a type of bar cookie and hybrid dessert that combines aspects and ingredients from cookies and brownies. The batter of a brownie and the dough of a cookie are usually made separately and then combined before baking. This can either be done by layering the batter and dough or by scooping one after the other into the pan.

Brookies are usually baked in square or rectangular baking pans, like brownies. This causes brookies to be similar in size and shape to brownies. Brookies often have a fudgy or cakey texture like brownies, while also keeping the chewy texture from cookies.

The brownie batter is often made with cocoa powder, sugar, eggs, flour and other ingredients. The cookie dough may include flour, eggs, brown sugar, and other ingredients. In addition, they may also be made with chocolate chips, rolled oats, nuts, or dried fruits. Brookies are often baked and served like brownies, and they may be served with a variety of accompaniments such as milk, ice cream, fruit, coffee or whipped cream.

== Variations ==
Multiple variations of brookie have been created. Many recipes substitute or add ingredients to have different flavors, textures or variations that meet dietary needs.

Vegan brookies are brookies made without any animal products. They are made to replace the butter, eggs, and milk chocolate chips using substitutes like apple sauce, vegetable oil, vegan butter and vegan chocolate chips.

Pumpkin swirl brookies are pumpkin or pumpkin spice flavored brookies. They are made with canned pumpkin puree and can additionally have cinnamon, nutmeg, allspice, pumpkin pie spice, ginger, cottage cheese, butterscotch chips and other spices.

Peanut butter brookies are made by adding peanut butter to the brownie batter. Peanut butter brookies can also be made with various other nut butters like almond butter, walnut butter, cookie butter, and others nut butters.

Brookies themselves can also be made into ice cream by blending or cutting brookies and adding it to the ice cream as it is being churned. This ice cream can then be made into milkshakes by blending the brookie ice cream with milk.

== History ==
The exact origins of the brookie are unknown. The brookie was being served by 1988, when records show the dessert appearing on the menu at Rafferty's Bar & Restaurant in Nashville, Tennessee.

In 2006, Joanna Crumley's Praline Brookies, a brookie variant combining pecan pralines and brookies, placed as a top 100 finalist competing for the $1,000,000 grand prize in the 42nd Pillsbury Bake-Off.

In 2014, Milk and Brookies was founded by Jovon English, Marques Brooks, Naimah Harris and Tisa Smart-Washington. In 2015, Milk and Brookies went on season 7 of Shark Tank seeking $100,000 for 20% equity. This offer was turned down. Later, in 2016 Milk and Brookies participated in the 2nd annual LA CookieCon in Los Angeles, California.

In 2016, Harry Foster baked brookies for an episode of MasterChef Australia Series 8, which won him the first round.

== See also ==
- Blondie
- Chocolate crinkle
- Croffle
- Cronut
- Cruffin
- Wonut
