= Croffle =

Croissant dough cooked on a waffle pan

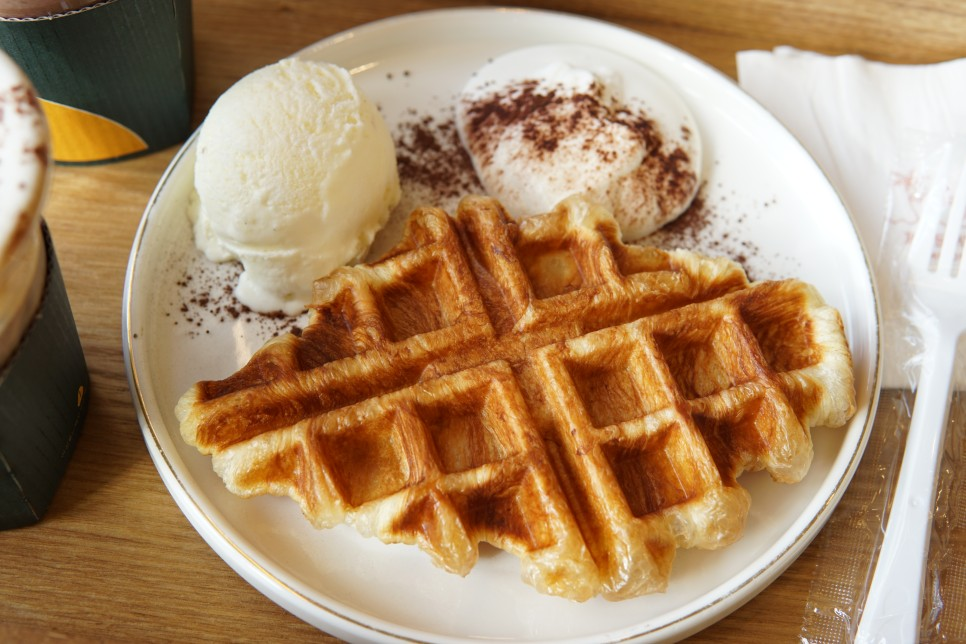
- Croffle
- Type: Pastry
- Place of origin: Ireland
- Created by: Louise Lennox

The croffle, croiffle or crofle is a hybrid of a croissant and waffle. It was popularized in South Korea and then spread throughout the world. The concept is reminiscent of another pastry, the Cronut, which is a croissant and donut hybrid created by Dominique Ansel.

== Description ==
The croissant and waffle are both popular breakfast items across the world; the croffle combines the buttery layers of the croissant with the crispiness of the waffle. Furthermore, the waffle patterning allows the pastry to catch syrups, sauces, or other toppings. Many sweet and/or savory combinations are possible (e.g. avocado and feta, lemon cheesecake, and Nutella and banana).

== History ==
Although it was popularized in South Korea, Irish pastry chef and TV show host, Louise Lennox, is sometimes credited with inventing the pastry. Lennox collaborated with bakery chain Cuisine de France at a 2017 pop-up called La Petite Boulangerie in Dublin, Ireland where the croffle was the pièce de résistance. However, a 2015 Food & Wine home cooking video in New York City also demonstrates how to make the croffle.

In November 2018, the café Aufglet debuted the croffle in Seoul. By early 2019, the croffle's popularity spread throughout the city, being served at various cafes and street food vendors. In 2020, the COVID-19 pandemic led to a dramatic increase in popularity. The ingredients were accessible and the preparation was relatively easy, so people staying at home started making croffles and posting pictures of them on social media. Some estimates suggest that waffle iron sales increased 300 percent from May 2019 to 2020. On 7 April 2020, South Korean singer and actress, Kang Min-kyung, posted on Instagram that the croffle was "really, so, so, so tasty".

Later in 2020, the croffle's popularity reached the United States, appearing in Flushing, Queens and Los Angeles Koreatown. It continued to spread globally, and started being served in pastry shops in Singapore, Thailand, Hong Kong, Canada, and Indonesia. Up to 2021, it continued to be popular on social media platforms like TikTok and YouTube.

== Preparation ==
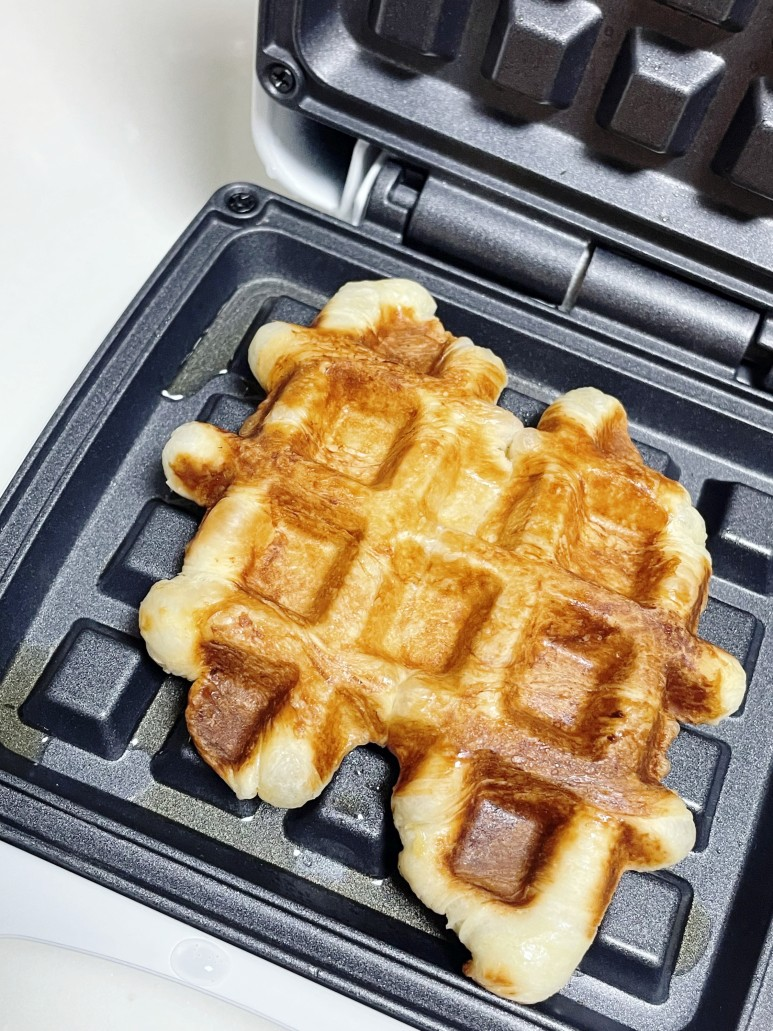
Croffle in a waffle iron

Croffles require croissant dough which can either be made or purchased. Purchasing croissant dough is the more practical method. Options for prepared dough include store-bought croissant dough or unbaked croissant dough from a local bakery. The dough is rolled in a croissant configuration. Then the croissant dough is rolled in sugar, either white or brown, and evenly coated. This enables the croffle to have a crispy golden exterior. The dough is then cooked in a preheated waffle iron. The croissant is pressed into it until golden and cooked through. Various toppings can then be added.

== See also ==
- Cronut
- Cruffin
- Cruller
- List of pastries
