= Chocolate brownie =

Baked confection

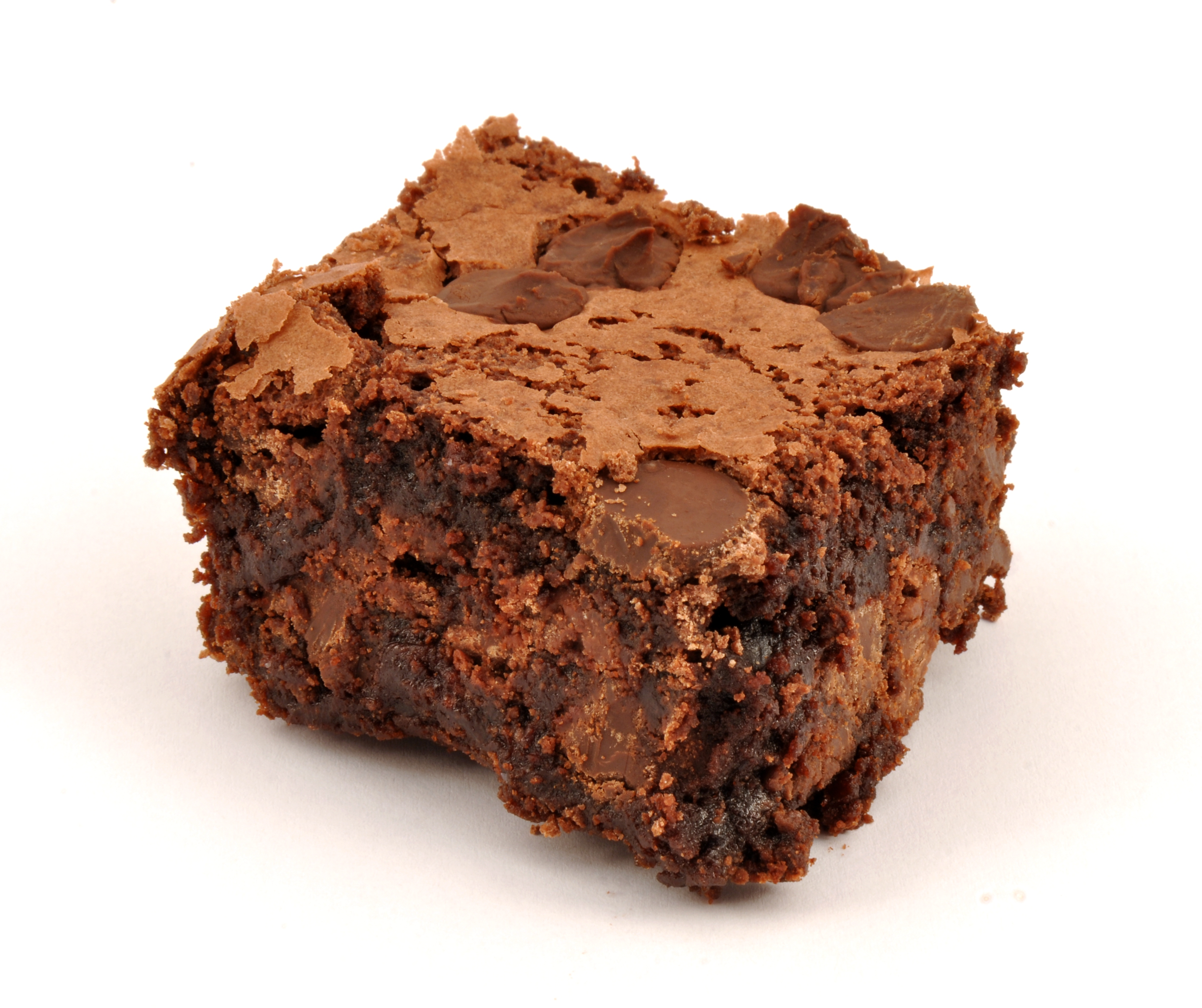
- A homemade brownie
- Type: Dessert bar
- Place of origin: United States
- Main ingredients: Flour; butter; eggs; chocolate or cocoa powder; sugar
- Variations: Blondie

A chocolate brownie, or simply a brownie, is a chocolate baked dessert bar. Brownies come in a variety of forms and may be either fudgy or cakey, depending on their density. Brownies often have a glossy "skin" on their upper crust and may include ingredients such as nuts, frosting, or chocolate chips.

A variation containing brown sugar and vanilla rather than chocolate in the batter is called a blond brownie or blondie. Another variation involves combining brownie batter with cookie dough, creating brookies. The brownie was developed in the United States at the end of the 19th century and was popularized during the first half of the 20th century.

== Serving ==
Brownies are typically eaten by hand or with utensils, and may be accompanied by a glass of milk, served warm with ice cream (à la mode), topped with whipped cream, or sprinkled with powdered sugar. In North America, they are common homemade treats, and they are also popular in restaurants, ice cream parlors, and coffeehouses. The same popularity in cafes is seen in Sweden.

In the Southern United States, brownies prepared from cake mix are a rare homemade dessert eaten on weekdays.

== History ==
=== Early history ===
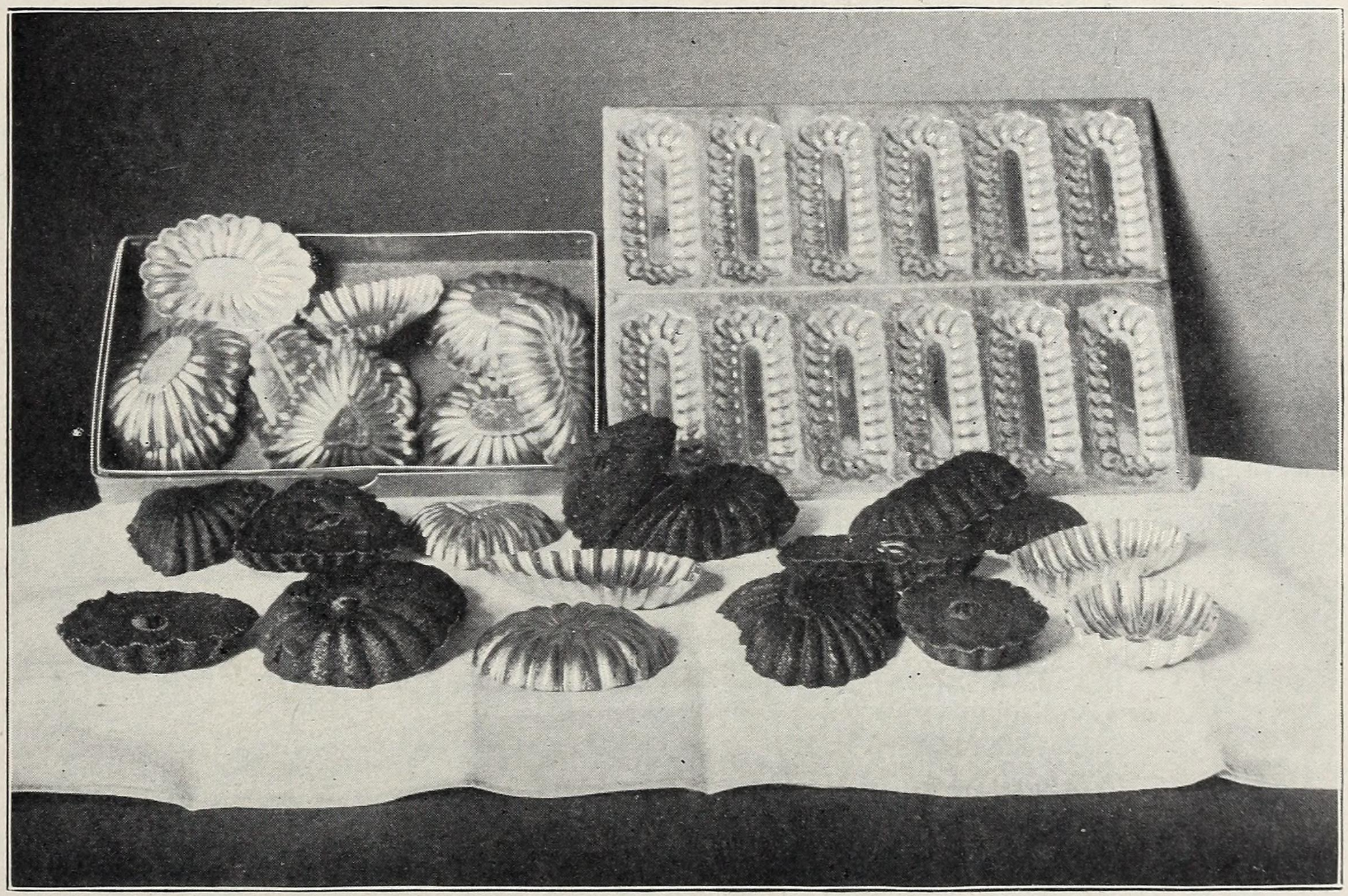
Brownies as they appeared in the 1903 edition of The Boston Cooking-School Cook Book, made from molasses.

During the 1880s in the United States, dinner parties themed around the color brown were popular events. Following the standard set in lifestyle magazines, hosts served brown dishes—bread, soup, turkey—including sautéed mushrooms, which were then known colloquially as "brownies". By the following decade, the event had evolved into a feast of sweets under the name "Brownie Banquets", parties decorated with figurines of illustrator Palmer Cox's comic characters The Brownies. Chocolate ice cream, graham crackers, and brownies were common elements with "brownie" now used to refer to a molasses cake. One such recipe appeared in the 1896 version of Fannie Farmer's The Boston Cooking-School Cook Book, containing molasses and a nut at their center, but no chocolate.

==== Chocolate brownies ====
In 1899, a recipe for an unleavened chocolate cake was published in a Chicago cookbook under the name "Brownie cake". Food writer Stella Parks identifies this as a "proto-brownie", the earliest she could find evidence of. Through 1904, recipes for brownies with modern ingredient ratios were published in newspapers in Chicago and the Northeastern United States regions; Parks infers from the broad area and quick succession these recipes appeared that they were drawing on a common source.

In the 1906 version of her cookbook, Farmer modified her recipe to include chocolate. Sources differ on how this came about; biochemist Shirley Corriher proposed in 2008 that these could have been created by Farmer reducing the flour in her 1896 chocolate cookie recipe, while Parks suggests Farmer may have been influenced by a 1905 visit to the Laconia Woman's Club, who had published a recipe for chocolate brownies in a 1904 cookbook. This edition of The Boston Cooking-School Cook Book was read widely, and for the first time the entire US was introduced to the brownie, with newspapers and cookbooks printing their own recipes over the following years. Recipes for brownies at this time required sugar and butter be creamed, giving these early brownies a cakey rather than fudgy texture.

Farmer trained Maria Willett Howard who ultimately created Lowney's Brownies for Walter M. Lowney Co. The Oxford Encyclopedia of Food and Drink in America reported that her recipe was often used in New England before 1912.

By 1907, the brownie was well established in a recognizable form, appearing in Lowney's Cook Book by Maria Willet Howard (published by Walter M. Lowney Company, Boston) as an adaptation of the Boston Cooking School recipe for a "Bangor Brownie". It added an extra egg and an additional square of chocolate, creating a richer, fudgier dessert. The name "Bangor Brownie" appears to have been derived from the town of Bangor, Maine, which an apocryphal story states was the hometown of a housewife who created the original brownie recipe. Maine food educator and columnist Mildred Brown Schrumpf was the main proponent of the theory that brownies were invented in Bangor. (Note: Numerous works erroneously credit Schrumpf herself as the inventor.) While The Oxford Companion to American Food and Drink (2007) refuted Schrumpf's premise that "Bangor housewives" had created the brownie, citing the publication of a brownie recipe in a 1905 Fannie Farmer cookbook, in its second edition, The Oxford Encyclopedia of Food and Drink in America (2013) said it had discovered evidence to support Schrumpf's claim, in the form of several 1904 cookbooks that included a recipe for "Bangor Brownies".

==== Palmer House brownie ====
Another legend about the creation of brownies is that of Bertha Palmer, a prominent Chicago socialite whose husband owned the Palmer House Hotel. In 1893, Palmer asked a pastry chef for a dessert suitable for ladies attending the Chicago World's Columbian Exposition. She requested a dessert that would be smaller than a piece of cake, and easily eaten from boxed lunches. The result was the Palmer House brownie, made of chocolate with walnuts and an apricot glaze. The Palmer House Hotel still serves this dessert to patrons made from the same recipe. The name was given to the dessert some time after 1893, but was not used by cookbooks or journals at the time.

=== Modern day ===
During the 1960s, brownies were introduced to TV dinners.

== Preparation ==
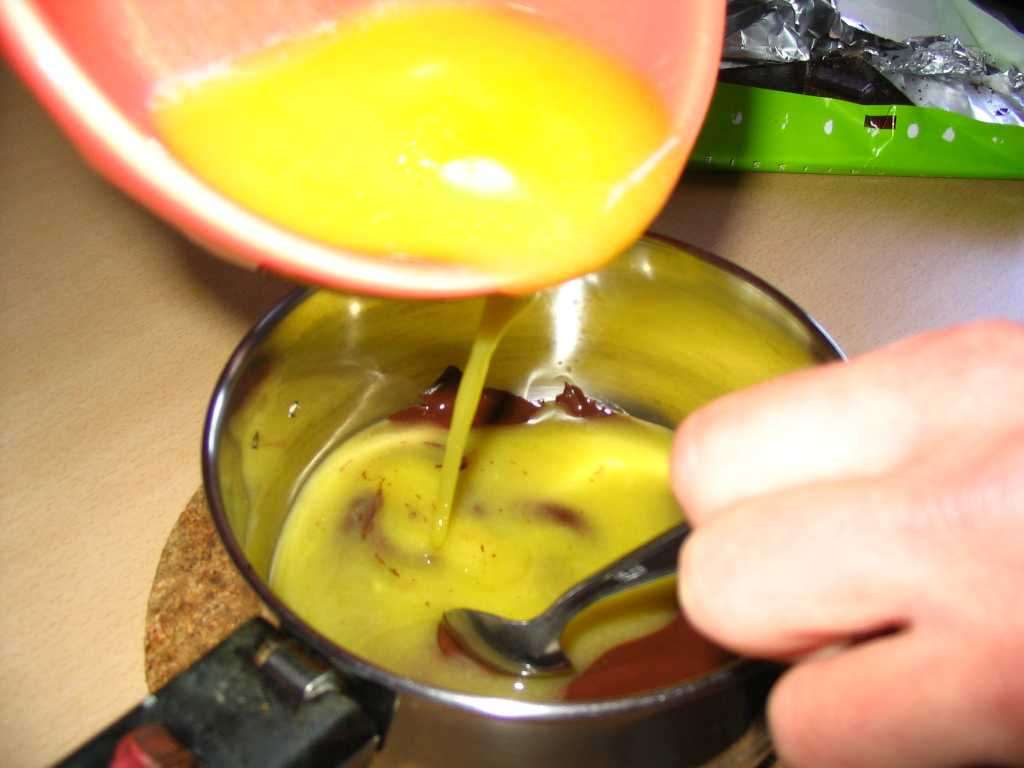
Mixing melted butter with chocolate to make a chocolate brownie

Early recipes, such as Lowney's Brownies, included chocolate, butter, eggs, salt, sugar, vanilla, flour, and chopped nuts, while modern recipes also include brown sugar. The 1976 edition of Lizzie Black Kander's The Settlement Cook Book also includes cocoa powder as a replacement for chocolate, baking powder, and walnuts. The book states that butter and chocolate should be melted together, while beaten eggs and sugar should be added to a separate mixture. The two should then be combined and beaten again, after which the remaining ingredients should be added. Corriher wrote that brownies can sometimes also include dried cherries and coffee beans.

== See also ==
- Fudge
- Hash brownie
- List of baked goods
- Kladdkaka

== Sources ==
- Black Kander, Lizzie (1976) [1901]. The Settlement Cook Book. Simon and Schuster. ISBN 978-0-671-22087-7.
- Corriher, Shirley (2008). BakeWise: The Hows and Whys of Successful Baking with Over 200 Magnificent Recipes. Simon and Schuster. pp. 407–415. ISBN 978-1-4165-6078-4.
- Clegg, Jo-Ann (February 27, 1998). "Brownie connection just doesn't pan out". The Virginian-Pilot. Norfolk, VA. Archived from the original on February 20, 2016 – via HighBeam Research.
- Davidson, Alan; Jaine, Tom; Vannithone, Soun (2014). The Oxford Companion to Food (3rd ed.). Oxford University Press. ISBN 978-0-19-967733-7.
- Deutsch, Jonathan; Saks, Rachel D. (2008). Jewish American Food Culture. Greenwood Press. ISBN 978-0-313-34319-3.
- Doutre-Roussel, Chloé (2006). The Chocolate Connoisseur: For Everyone With A Passion for Chocolate. Jeremy P. Tarcher/Penguin. ISBN 978-1-58542-488-7.
- Dupree, Nathalie (2011). "United States: The South". In Albala, Ken (ed.). Food Cultures of the World Encyclopedia. Vol. 2. Bloomsbury Publishing. ISBN 978-0-313-37627-6.
- Farmer, Fannie (1918). The Boston Cooking-School Cook Book (PDF). Little, Brown, and Company.
- Geczy, Adam; Karaminas, Vicki (2022). Gastrofashion from Haute Cuisine to Haute Couture: Fashion and Food (1st ed.). Bloomsbury Visual Arts. ISBN 978-1-350-14750-8.
- Goff, H. Douglas; Hartel, Richard W. (2013). Ice Cream (7th ed.). Springer. ISBN 978-1-4614-6096-1.
- Heatter, Maida (1999). Maida Heatter's Book of Great Desserts. Andrews McMeel Publishing. ISBN 978-0-8362-7861-3.
- Heatter, Maida (2011). Maida Heatter's Cookies. Andrews McMeel Publishing. ISBN 978-1-4494-0115-3.
- Holbrook, Carolyn (June 21, 2005). "Nothing beats a brownie". The Age.
- Kiple, Kenneth F., ed. (2000). The Cambridge World History of Food. Cambridge Univ. Press. ISBN 978-1-139-05863-6.
- Linford, Jenny; Pattullo, Alice (2018). The Seven Culinary Wonders of the World: A History of Honey, Salt, Chile, Pork, Rice, Cacao, and Tomato. Smithsonian Books. ISBN 978-1-58834-642-1.
- Linford, Jenny (2018). The Missing Ingredient: The Curious Role of Time in Food and Flavour. Particular Books. ISBN 978-1-84614-897-2.
- Maynard, Nora (2007). Allen, Gary; Albala, Ken (eds.). The Business of Food: Encyclopedia of the Food and Drink Industries. Greenwood Press. ISBN 978-0-313-06917-8.
- McGee, Harold (2004). On Food and Cooking: the Science and Lore of the Kitchen. Scribner. ISBN 978-0-684-80001-1.
- Parks, Stella (2017). Bravetart: Iconic American Desserts (1st ed.). W.W. Norton & Company. ISBN 978-0-393-23986-7.
- Saekel, Karola. "Panel Gives Baking Mixes a High Score". San Francisco Chronicle.
- Shapiro, Laura (2004). Something From the Oven: Reinventing Dinner in 1950's America. Viking. ISBN 978-0-14-303491-9.
- Sheraton, Mimi (2015). 1,000 Foods To Eat Before You Die: A Food Lover's Life List. Workman Publishing. ISBN 978-0-7611-8306-8.
- Snow, Jane (April 30, 2003). "Seeking the ultimate brownies". Akron Beacon Journal. Akron, OH. Archived from the original on February 20, 2016 – via HighBeam Research.
- Smith, Andrew F., ed. (2007). The Oxford Companion to American Food and Drink. Oxford University Press. ISBN 978-0-19-988576-3.
- Smith, Andrew F., ed. (2013). The Oxford Encyclopedia of Food and Drink in America. Vol. 2. Oxford University Press. ISBN 978-0-19-973496-2.
- Teubner, Christian (1997). The Chocolate Bible. Studio. ISBN 978-0-670-87371-5.
- Villagran Backman, Gabriela (2011). "Sweden". In Albala, Ken (ed.). Food Cultures of the World Encyclopedia. Vol. 4. Bloomsbury Publishing. ISBN 978-0-313-37627-6.
- Westmoreland, Susan, ed. (2007). The Good Housekeeping Cookbook. Hearst Books. ISBN 978-1-58816-561-9.
- Wilkinson-Weber, Clare M.; DeNicola, Alicia Ory, eds. (2016). Critical Craft: Technology, Globalization, and Capitalism. Bloomsbury Academic. ISBN 978-1-4725-9485-3.
- Willett Howard, Maria (2010). Lowney's Cook Book. Pelican Publishing. ISBN 978-1-58980-756-3.
- Zanger, Mark H (2013). "Brownies". In Smith, Andrew F. (ed.). The Oxford Encyclopedia of Food and Drink in America. Vol. 1. Oxford University Press. ISBN 978-0-19-973496-2.
