= Blondie (confection) =

Vanilla dessert bar similar to brownies

Blondies
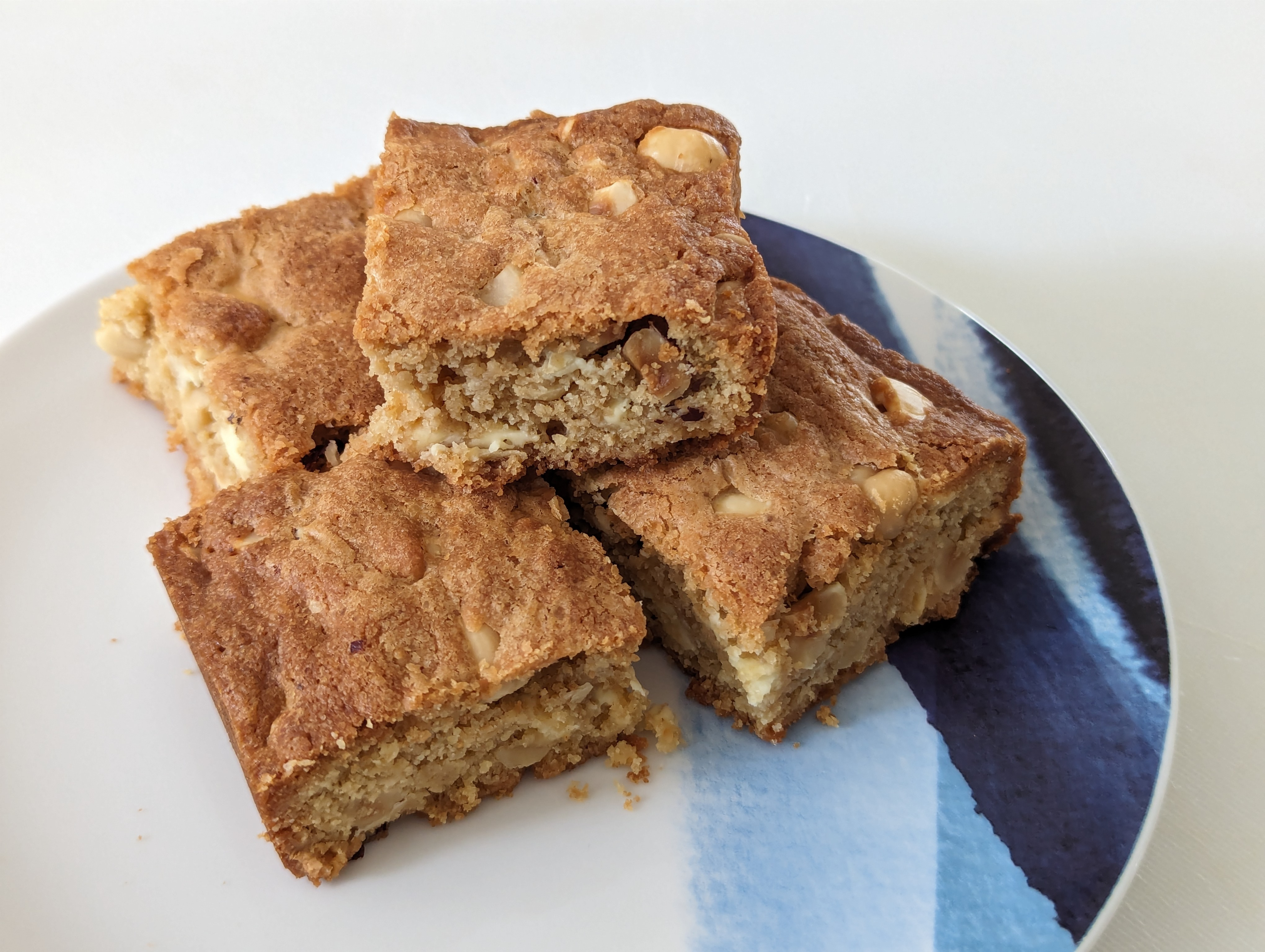
- Hazelnut and white chocolate blondies
- Alternative names: Blonde brownie, blondie bar, blondies, butterscotch brownie.
- Type: Dessert bar
- Course: Dessert
- Place of origin: United States
- Region or state: The Americas, North East
- Main ingredients: Flour, sugar, butter, eggs, baking powder, vanilla

A blondie, also known as a blonde brownie or butterscotch brownie, is a dessert bar originating in the United States. Rather than chocolate, blondies are based on brown sugar and vanilla, making them light in color.

== History ==
Originally, the term "brownie" did not refer exclusively to chocolate brownies, but also included blondies. There is not total agreement on when the first "brownie", generally speaking, was invented, but the earliest known general brownie recipe to be recorded was by Fannie Farmer in 1896, based on molasses. Chocolate brownies became ubiquitous in the early 1900s, taking over the name, and by the mid-1900s molasses-based brownies were known as "blonde brownies", later shortened to "blondies".

== See also ==
- Chocolate brownie
- Brookie (food)
