= Jødekager =

Cookie of Danish Jewish origin

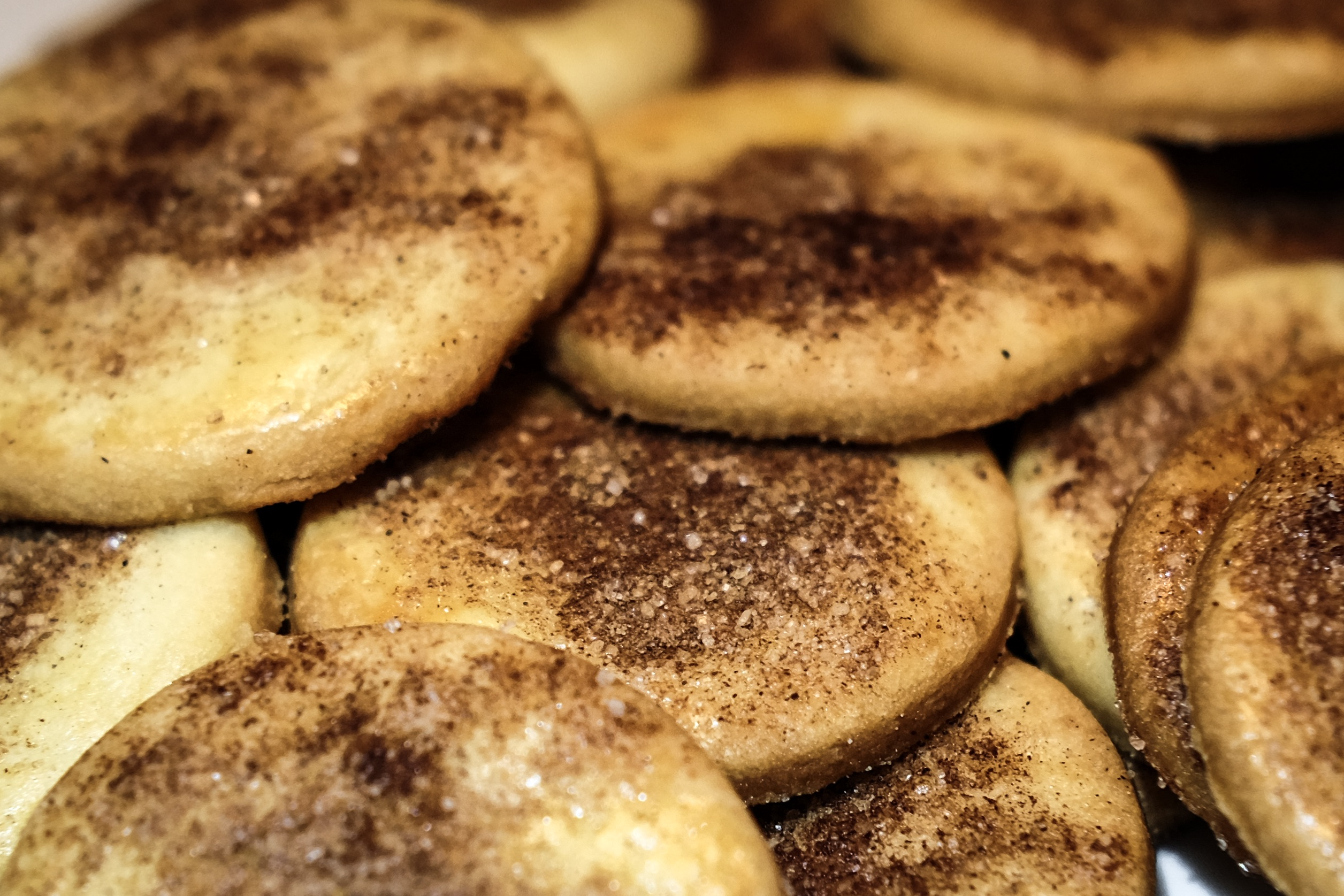
- Typical Jødekager that are not topped with almonds
- Type: Cookie
- Place of origin: Denmark
- Associated cuisine: Jewish cuisine, Danish cuisine
- Main ingredients: Almonds, Butter, Cinnamon, Egg, Flour, and Sugar

Jødekager (lit. 'Jewish cookies') are popular cookies of Danish Jewish origin. They consist of a soft butter cookie base which is topped with cinnamon sugar and occasionally chopped almonds.

Early versions of the recipe originated in the Danish Jewish community starting in the 18th century, though the current version dates from the 19th century. They are commonly eaten during Christmas in Denmark.

== Origins ==
Jødekager have Sephardi origins from Iberian Jews who resettled in the Netherlands after the Spanish Inquisition. In the Encyclopedia of Jewish Food, Gil Marks writes that "these Spanish and Portuguese Jews merged their Moorish-influenced Iberian fare with the local Scandinavian cuisine." Due to wide availability, butter was used instead of olive oil. Variations on Jewish butter cookies (Dutch: Joodse boterkoeke) eventually spread to Denmark and elsewhere in Scandinavia, as well as England and Germany. By the 16th century, Jewish bakeries in Copenhagen were producing a local version of butter cookies topped with nuts and cinnamon. Because butter cookies were a Christmas tradition for Danish Christians, Jewish butter cookies became a popular Christmas dessert.

== Ingredients ==
Several different cookie recipes have been called "jødekager" in Denmark. A "white Jewish cookie" (Danish: hvide jødekage) was the first recorded, with a recipe dating back to 1796. It was made with a yeast dough that rose overnight and was spiced with anise. Early 19th century recipes for this "white" cookie swapped out the yeast dough in favor of a recipe with eggs, almond flour, and cardamom. This cookie, however, seems to have fallen out of popularity as it does not appear in cookbooks after the mid-19th century.

A second recipe for a "brown Jewish cookie" (Danish: brune jødekage) emerged around this time period, and was first recorded in 1853. They included flour, butter, almond flour, vanilla, cardamom, eggs, and brown sugar. Before baking, the cookies were sprinkled with cinnamon, sugar, and chopped almonds. Other recipes included ginger, rose water, beer, and lemon in this version of jødekager. By the 1890s, recipes for these jødekager began to appear without spices in the dough, more closely resembling the modern version of the cookie. Although the modern version is only topped with cinnamon, the historic recipes which were heavily spiced further evidence the cookie's connection to the Jewish community, as Jewish bakeries would have deeper ties to imported spices.

Today, the base of the cookie dough consists of butter, wheat flour, sugar, and typically egg. It is always brushed with a mixture of cinnamon sugar, and may be topped with chopped almonds.

== See also ==
- History of the Jews in Denmark
- Jewish cuisine
- Danish cuisine
- Jodenkoek
- Snickerdoodle
- List of shortbread biscuits and cookies
