= Jodenkoek =

Dutch shortbread cookie

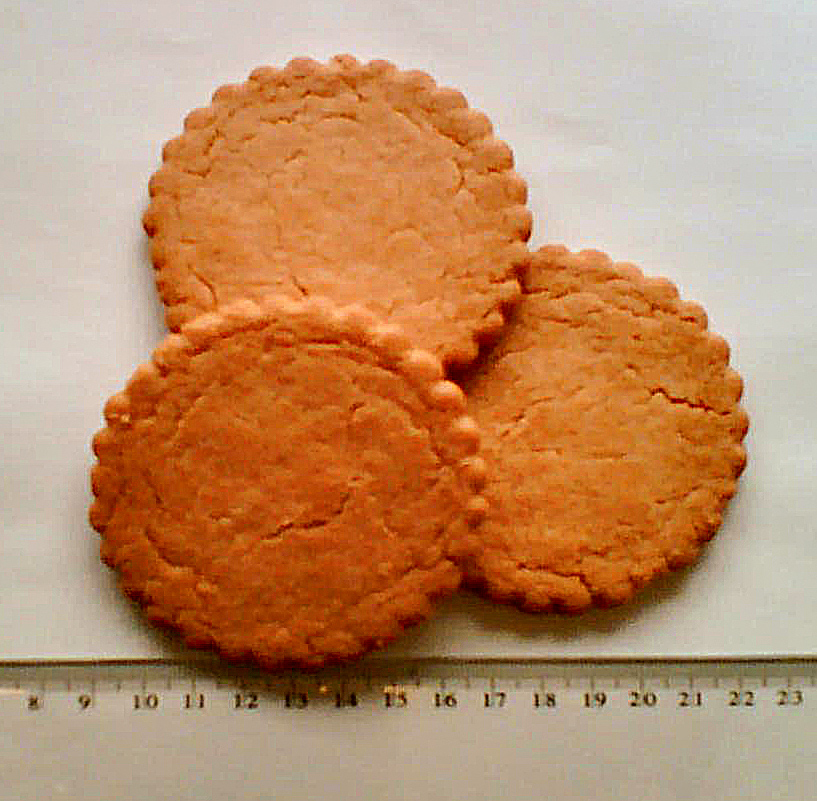
- Place of origin: Netherlands

A jodenkoek (in Dutch, literal translation: "Jew biscuit", plural: jodenkoeken) is a big, flat, round shortbread biscuit with a diameter of about 10 centimeters (3.9 in).

== History ==
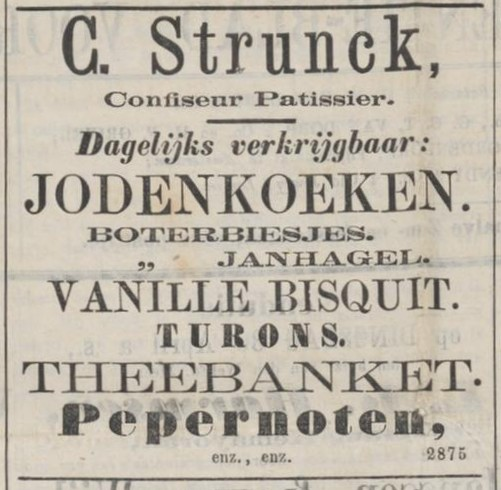
pastry shop advertising Jodenkoeken in 1872

Claimed to have been first baked in the 17th century, these biscuits were advertised by bakeries as early as 1872. Jodenkoeken were popularized by Davelaar, in Alkmaar, Netherlands. The Stam bakery in Alkmaar started selling jodenkoeken in 1883, and Gijs Verhoeven took over this bakery in 1924. By advertising in local newspapers and by offering the biscuits through other shops, his jodenkoeken became a popular product. The company continues to bake them to this day. Similar products with the same name are produced by Lotus Bakeries and O'Lacy.

== Etymology ==
Some producers still use the old spelling, jodekoek, while others have changed the name of the product to jodenkoek, after the new orthography of the Netherlands from 1996. There are several explanations about the origins of the name:

- The name jodenkoek (literally "Jew biscuit") may derive from the Dutch word jood, an archaic term for iodine. In the 1840s, French baker Pierre Chazelle developed a flat, hard biscuit enriched with iodine to combat goitre, which he called biscuit de iode ("iodine biscuit"). Dutch baker Paul Victor Goulmy later introduced a similar biscuit in the Netherlands under the name iodekransen, which was often rendered as joodekransen due to historical spelling conventions—jood being the former Dutch spelling for iodine before the adoption of the -ium suffix.
- Lotus Bakeries claims that the recipe originates from a Jewish baker in Amsterdam who sold the biscuits around 1920. This baker sold the recipe to a bakery in Enkhuizen.
- A baker with surname 'de Joode' baked the biscuits.
- Jodenkoeken are big but very flat, making it a cheap product to produce. A lot of cheap products got the prefix Jewish in the past. A lot of Jews were poor, making it likely that they bought cheaper things because it was necessary.
- The last story associates the biscuit with the unleavened bread baked by the Jews of ancient Egypt at the time of the exodus. The connection is made by the physical properties that both the biscuits and unleavened bread have in common: they are both flat, crunchy and have a very low moisture content, resulting in a long shelf-life.

In the 1970s the name was thought to be discriminatory by some, and the manufacturer considered changing it, but ultimately decided against it. The name has received little to no controversy since then. Rights activist Wim Kortenoeven, specialising in Jewish history, is critical of the naming of the Dutch sweet jodenvet, "Jew fat" (now borsthoning, "chest honey"), but said he saw nothing wrong with the name "jodenkoek". In 2021 Bakery Davelaar in Alkmaar decided to rename the Jodenkoek to Odekoek (or Ode biscuit).

== Packaging ==
Originally, the biscuits were sold in metal tins with a yellow wrapper. Nowadays jodenkoeken are also sold in plastic tins lined with a purple wrapper. Because the biscuits are packaged in an air-tight tin, they remain fresh and crunchy.

== See also ==
- List of shortbread biscuits and cookies
