= E.L. Fudge =

American snack food

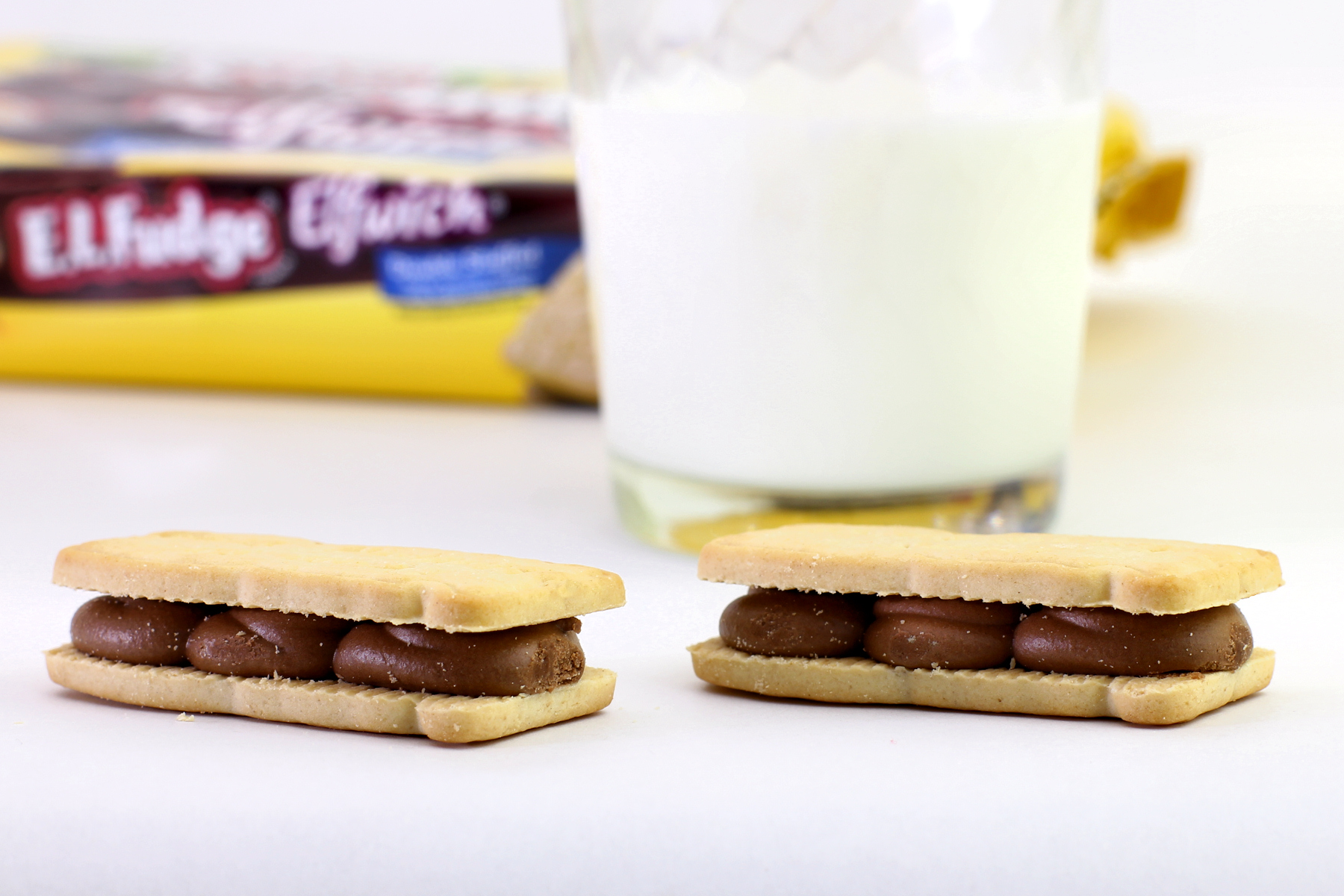
A serving of E.L. Fudge Elfwich Cookies "Double Stuffed".

E.L. Fudge is an American snack food introduced in 1986 and manufactured by the Keebler Company, a subsidiary of Ferrero SpA. They are butter-flavored shortbread sandwich cookies with a fudge creme filling. The company describes their shape as "elfin", though it is actually various Keebler elves, each identified with a name tag.

The name is derived from the Keebler Elf (E.L.F.), but when they were first introduced, the "E.L." stood for "Everybody Loves".

Varieties include Original and Double Stuffed (with twice the filling, introduced in May 2002) as well as fudge cookies with either fudge or peanut butter filling.

A Hershey dark chocolate marble fudge ice cream variety includes E.L. Fudge cookies.

To promote The SpongeBob SquarePants Movie in 2004, Keebler released special SpongeBob SquarePants-themed EL Fudge cookies.

== See also ==
- List of shortbread biscuits and cookies
