= Sandie (cookie) =

Type of sugar cookie; shortbread cookie

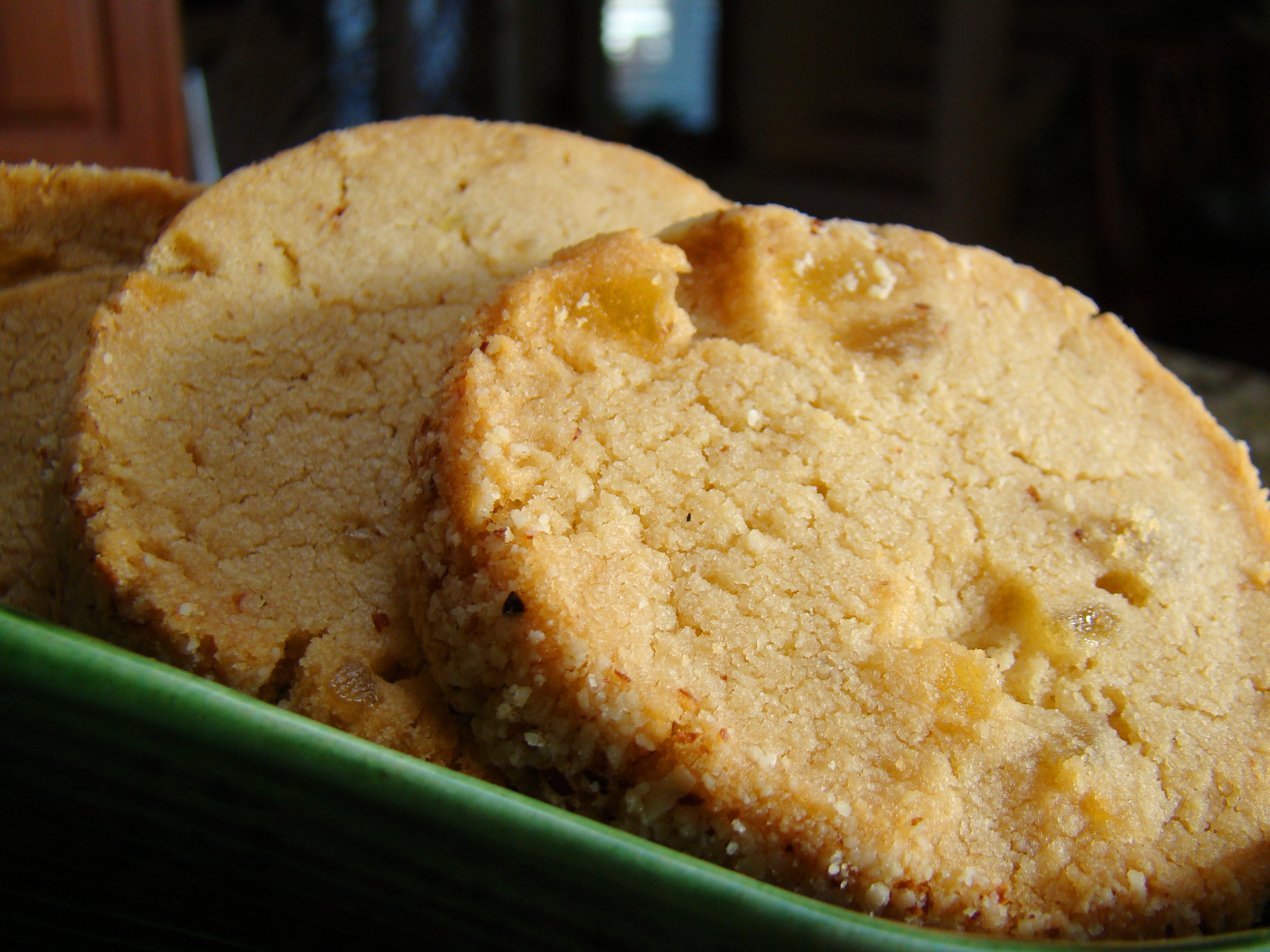
Ginger sandies

The sandie, sometimes referred to as sablé, is a type of sugar cookie or shortbread cookie. The pecan sandie is a common variety of the cookie utilizing pecans. The Keebler Company has registered the brand name Sandies, which it uses for a line of shortbread cookies.

Pecans are often used as a main ingredient, and may be crushed and included in the batter, or else placed atop the cookie whole. This pecan cookie is sometimes referred to as a pecan sandie.

== Overview ==
The sandie is a type of sugar cookie or shortbread cookie prepared using standard sugar cookie ingredients such as flour, sugar, butter, eggs, and vanilla. The Keebler Sandie uses soya bean oil and palm oil as a butter substitute. Sandies are sometimes dusted with powdered sugar after cooking.

== Commercial production ==
The Keebler Company mass-produces and markets Sandies Classic (plain), Pecan, and Cashew shortbread cookies. Keebler first produced Sandies cookies in 1955 and added a toffee variety in 1993.

== Sablés ==
The sandie is a type of sablé, a popular round shortbread cookie that, according to the letters of the Marquise de Sévigné, might have originated in Sablé-sur-Sarthe in France in 1670. "Sablé" means "sanded" in French, and is so named because of its crumbly and fine texture.

== Pecan sandies gallery ==
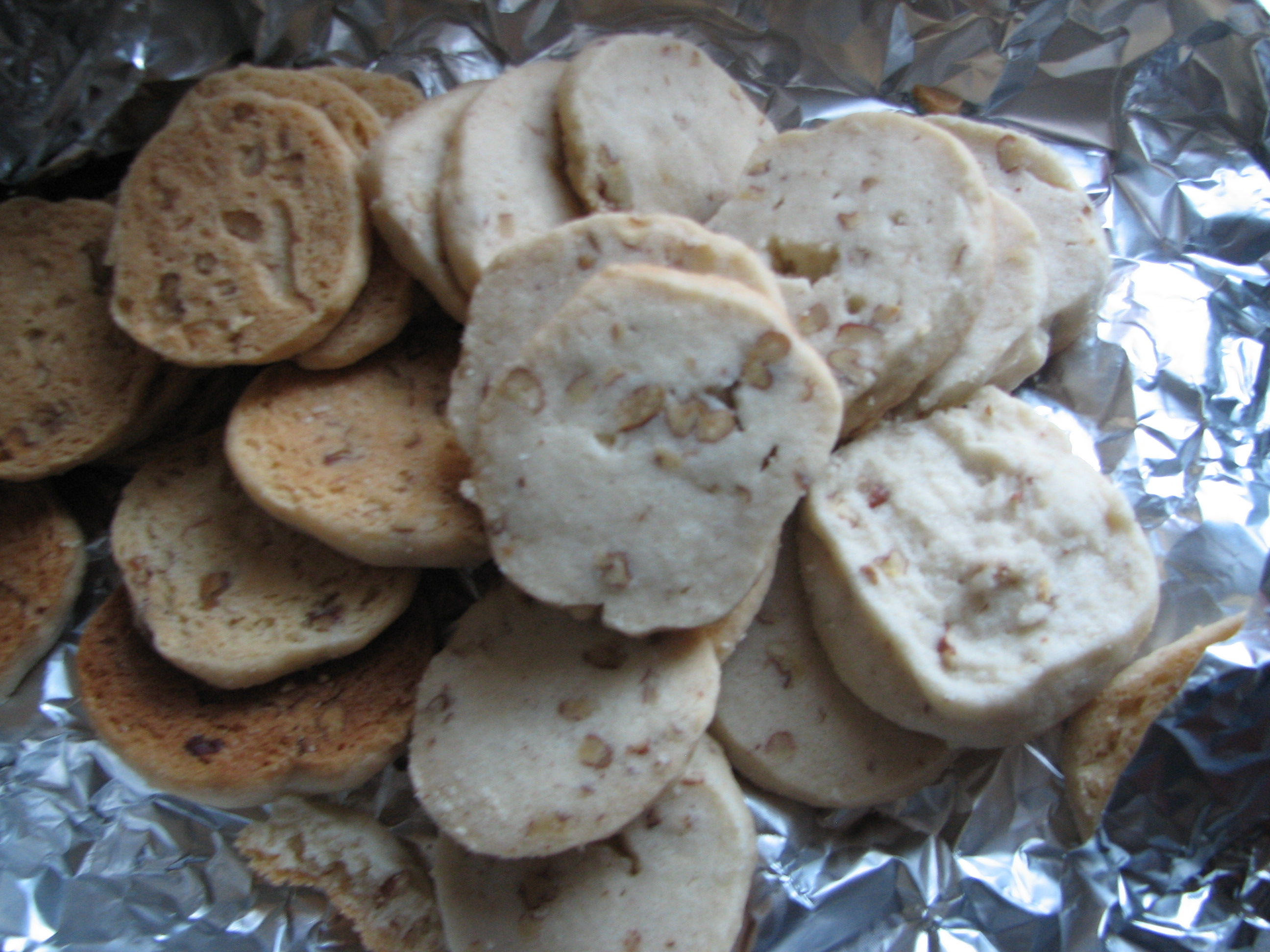
Pecan sandies with the nuts in the batter

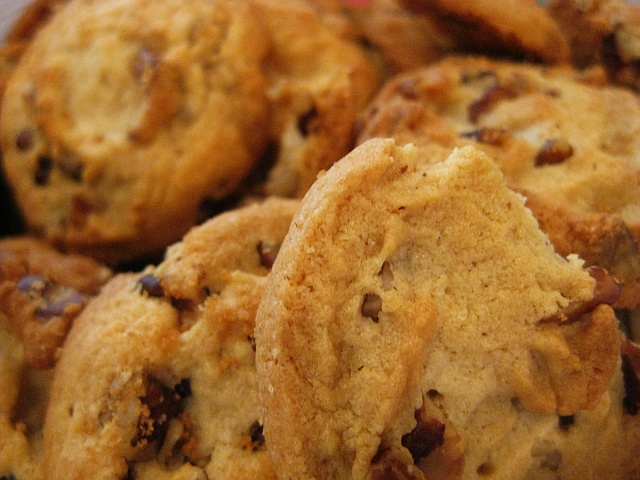
A close-up view of pecan sandies

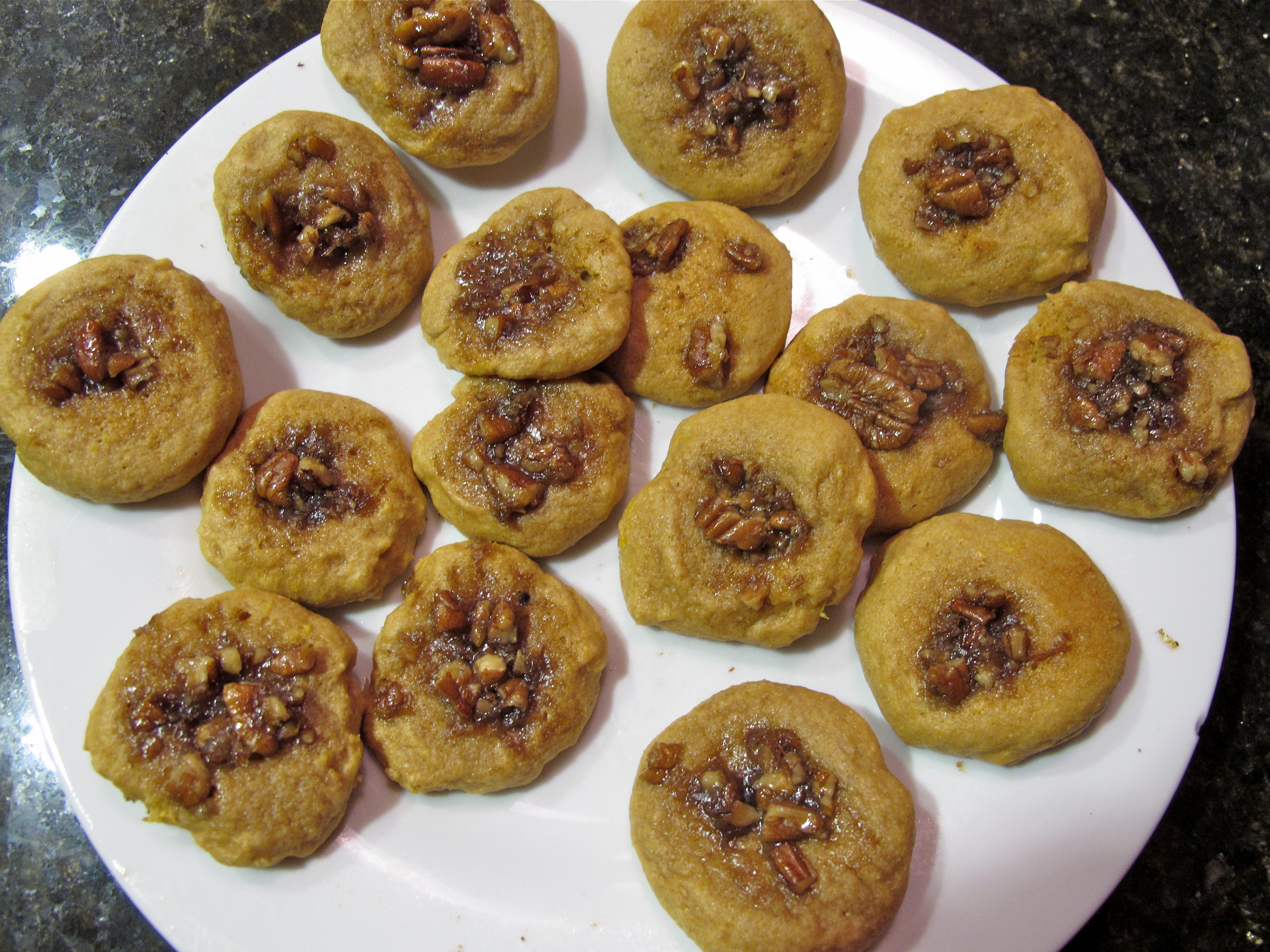
Lemon pecan sandies with the nuts atop

== See also ==
- Corn cookie
- List of cookies
- List of shortbread biscuits and cookies
- Snickerdoodle
- Teacake
  - Russian tea cake
