= Chinese walnut cookie =

Traditional Chinese food

Tao Su (桃酥)
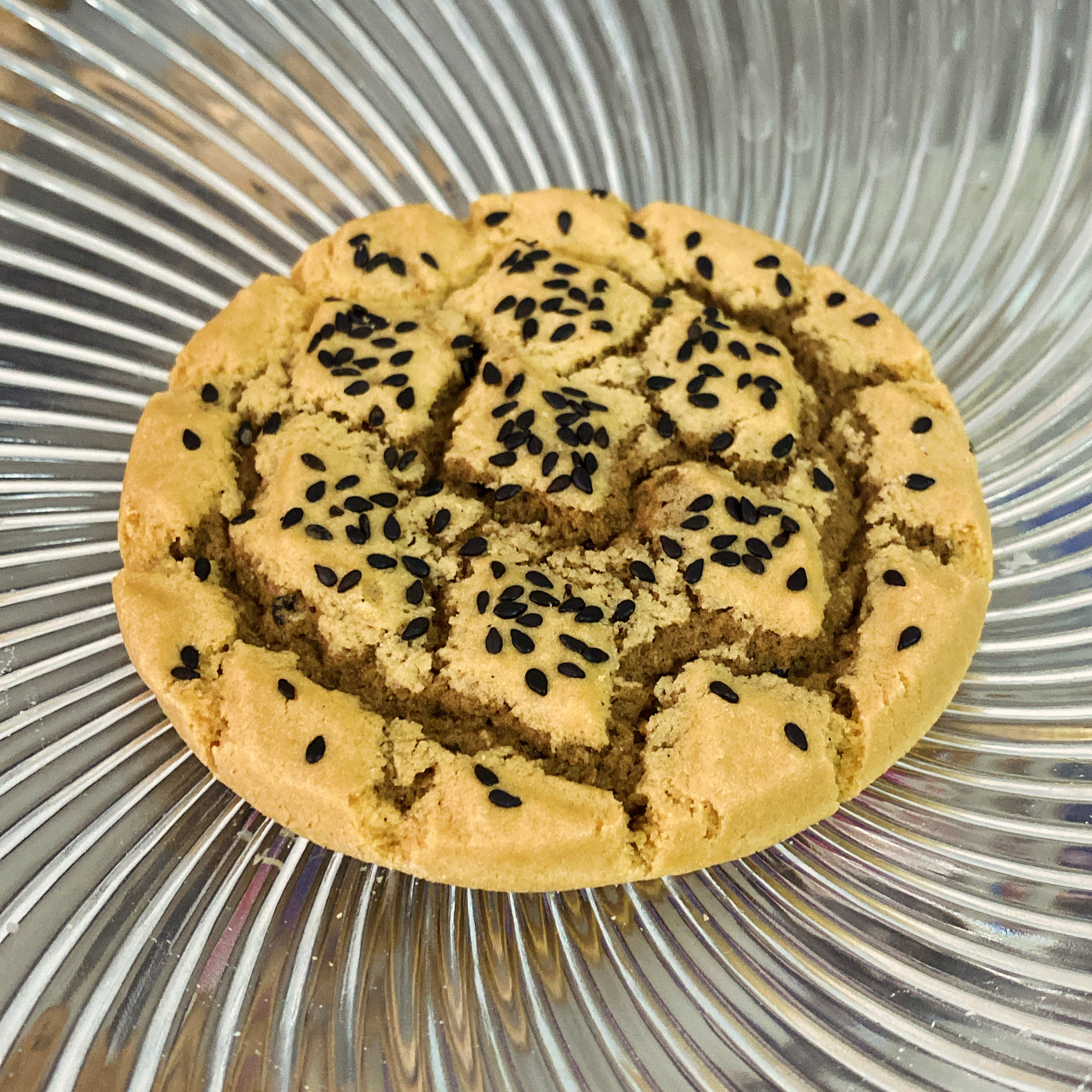
- Alternative names: He tao su ("hup toh soh" in Guangdong dialect, 核桃酥), tao su bing (桃酥餅)
- Type: Sou, shortbread
- Associated cuisine: Chinese, Northeastern Chinese, Shandong, Jiangxi
- Main ingredients: granulated or ground walnuts, granulated sugar, (variety) wheat flour, (variety) lard

Chinese walnut cookies, are popular and symbolically important sou (roughly translated to as "shortbread," rather than "cookies"), that are traditionally served to visitors during Chinese New Year celebrations.

== Symbolism ==
Walnuts are believed to be good for lung function and relieve lung and circulation symptoms. In the new year, eating walnuts is symbolic of ensuring happiness in the coming year.

Hup toh soh is traditionally served to visitors during Chinese New Year celebrations.

== History ==
According to legend, at the beginning of the Tang dynasty, peasants from the surrounding counties of Jingdezhen such as Leping, Guixi and Yingtan went to be potters, and due to the busy work schedule at that time, a peasant from Leping would bring his flour and mix it and put it directly on the surface of the kiln for baking, and since he had a cough all the time, he used to eat walnut to stop his cough, so he would add crushed walnut when baking. Other porcelain workers see this method as the dry food for daily preservation and long-distance transport of porcelain when eating, they have followed suit and named it " walnut cookie", which is the origin of the walnut cookies.

With the transport of porcelain, a walnut cookies in transit one by one left a footprint, loved by the local people, and on its original basis with some local specialties, to the Tang dynasty, Tianbao years, walnut cookie production process mature, better taste, was transmitted to the palace, became a common snack at the palace, after being called the "Palace walnut cookie".

In the Ming dynasty, there were two chief ministers in Jiangxi, Xia Yan and Yan Song, one is loyal and the other is traitorous, Yan Song was promoted by Xia Yan, but Xia Yan was framed by Yan Song and died. Some of Xia Yan's descendants fled to Shangqing Guazhou Village, and some of them lived in Longtou Mountain passing the way of making walnut cookies down from generation to generation.

== Characteristics ==
A walnut cookie is a special snack for both the North and the South, famous for its dry, crispy, crunchy and sweet characteristics.

== Nutrition ==
It contains carbohydrates, protein, fat, vitamins, and minerals such as calcium, potassium, phosphorus, sodium, magnesium, and selenium.

== See also ==
- Sou (pastry)
- Chinese desserts
- List of shortbread biscuits and cookies
