= Empire biscuit =

Scottish biscuit

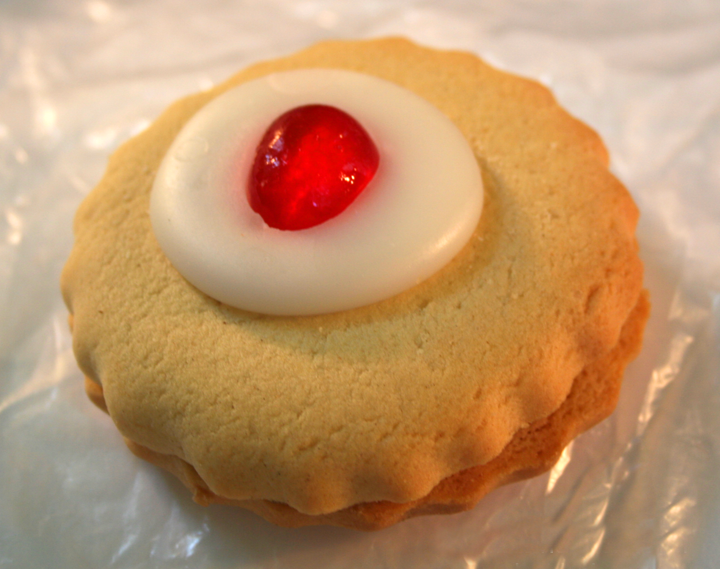
- Alternative names: German biscuit, Linzer biscuit, Deutsch biscuit, Belgian biscuit, iced biscuit
- Type: Biscuit
- Place of origin: Scotland
- Main ingredients: Biscuits, jam in between two biscuits. The top is covered with white glace icing, usually decorated with a jelly sweet or traditionally, half a glazed cherry.

An Empire biscuit (also known as Imperial biscuit, Imperial cookie, German biscuit, Belgian biscuit and iced biscuit) is a sweet biscuit originating in Scotland and popular in the North East of England. It is also popular in Ireland, as well as Canada (particularly iconic in Winnipeg and Hamilton).

Empire biscuits were originally known as German biscuits but were renamed during World War I due to anti-German sentiment. Other regional names include Belgian cookies, Imperial biscuits or double biscuits.

Empire biscuits are known for their buttery texture, sweet jam filling (although it does not necessarily have to be jam - it can be any other sweet spread such as a ganache), and the extra sweetness from the icing, making them a popular choice in bakeries and for afternoon tea.

== History ==
The Empire biscuit was originally known as the "Linzer biscuit", and later as the "Deutsch biscuit". With the outbreak of the First World War it was renamed the Empire biscuit.

== Ingredients ==
The typical Empire biscuit has a layer of jam in between two biscuits, typically shortbread. The top is covered with white water icing, usually decorated with a glace cherry in the centre, but Dew Drops are common too. They are derived from the Austrian Linzer Augen, a similar shortbread cookie sandwich which has 1–3 small round cut outs (the "eyes") in the upper cookie and is dusted with powdered sugar. The empire biscuit does not have a cut-out section on the top and is decorated with white icing.

== See also ==
- List of shortbread biscuits and cookies

Other foods renamed for political reasons include:

- Liberty cabbage
- Freedom fries
- Kyiv mule
