= Lorna Doone (cookie) =

Brand of shortbread cookie

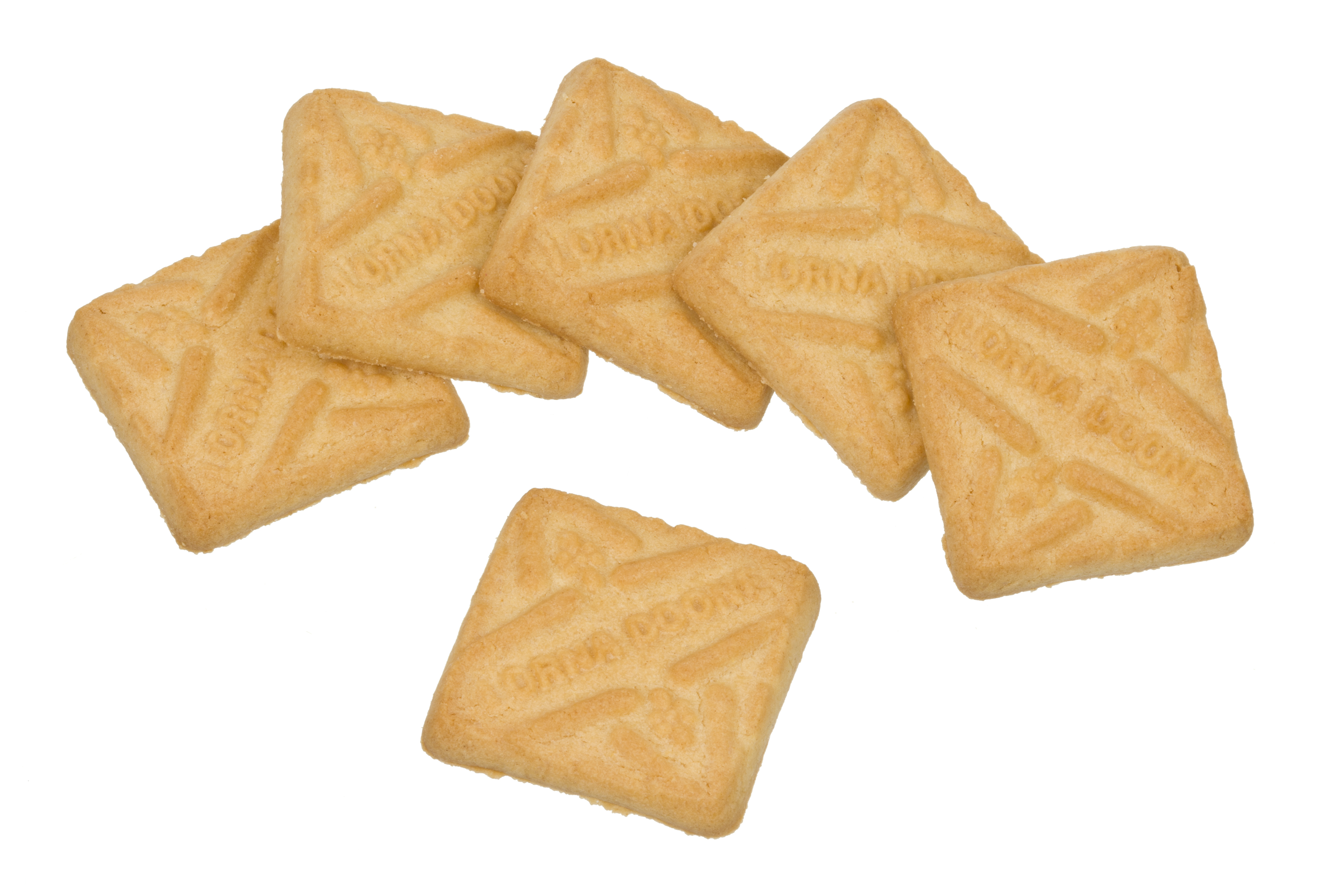
- Product type: Cookie
- Current owner: Mondelez International
- Introduced: 1912; 114 years ago
- Previous owners: Nabisco
- Website: snackworks.com/lornadoone

Lorna Doone is a brand of golden, square-shaped shortbread cookie produced by Nabisco and owned by Mondelez International.

== History ==
Introduced in 1912, it was possibly named after the main character in R. D. Blackmore's 1869 novel, Englishwoman Lorna Doone, but no record exists as to the exact motivation behind the name.

One origin story for the Lorna Doone recipe is that a Nabisco employee from Pittsburgh, Joe Hoawat, sold his Scottish-born mother's shortbread recipe to the company.

An alternate origin story is that the original cookie recipe came from the Malloys, Emily and John, who ran a bakery in Chicago. Emily had created the recipe, but when they closed down the bakery, John sold the recipe to F. A. Kennedy Steam Bakery which had also first produced the Fig Newton in 1891.

== See also ==
- List of shortbread biscuits and cookies
