= Caramel shortbread =

Biscuit confectionery

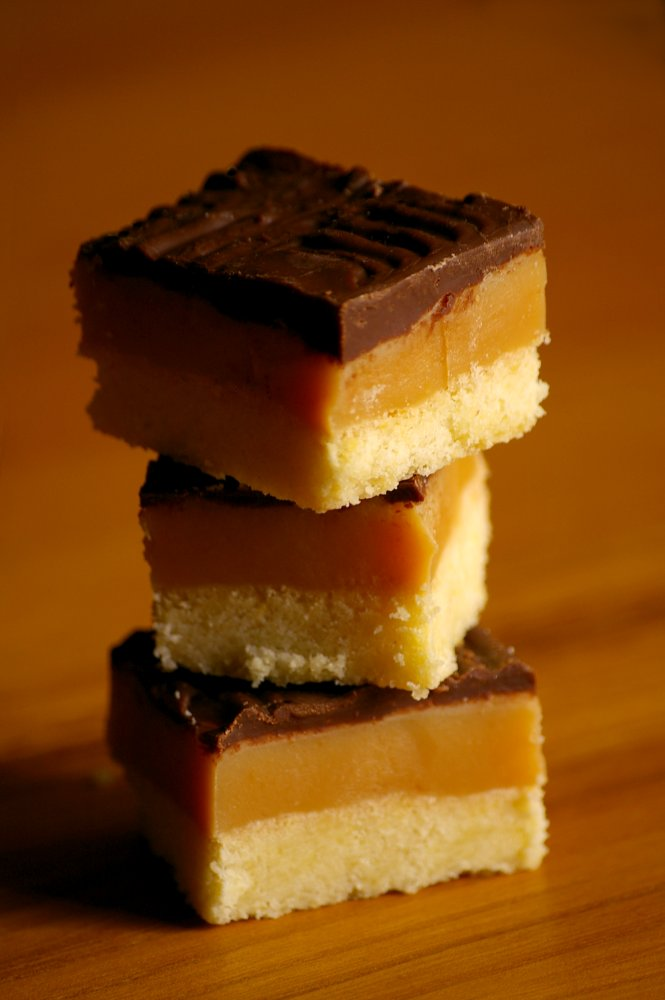
- Alternative names: Caramel squares, caramel slice, millionaire's shortbread, millionaire's slice, chocolate caramel shortbread, Wellington squares
- Course: Dessert
- Associated cuisine: Scotland, United Kingdom, Australia, New Zealand
- Main ingredients: Shortbread, caramel, milk chocolate
- Variations: Gluten-free, vegan, white chocolate, Anzac biscuit, espresso, hazelnut, Raisin, Peanut butter

Caramel shortbread, also known as caramel squares, caramel slice, millionaire's shortbread, millionaire's slice, chocolate caramel shortbread or Wellington squares is a biscuit confectionery composed of a shortbread base topped with caramel and milk chocolate. Variations exist which substitute or add ingredients to cater to different tastes, dietary requirements or ingredient availability.

== History ==
Caramel shortbread is an adapted form of the original Scottish shortbread. Scottish shortbread originated around the 15th century, but its modern refined form is attributed to the efforts of Mary, Queen of Scots in the 16th century.

Combinations of shortbread with caramel topping dates to at least the early 1950s. In 1972 a recipe for Chocolate Caramel Crunch (Millionaires' Shortbread) with a layer of caramel and chocolate on shortbread, was published in Scotland.

Recipes for the dish with a chocolate topping also appeared in Australia in the early 1970s in The Australian Women's Weekly. The earliest of these recipes appears in 1970 in an issue of The Australian Women's Weekly under the name "Caramel Shortbread", but this version lacks the distinctive chocolate topping. Later recipes such as one from 1981 include the chocolate layer.

The treat is still commonly associated with the cuisines of Australian, New Zealand, Scotland, and the United Kingdom more generally. In Scotland it is often served to the first visitor to a house on New Year's Day. It is also consumed around the world, where it is known by different names. In 2018 the dessert was featured in an episode of the American television show America's Test Kitchen.

== Naming ==
The name of the dessert varies by different regions and has varied throughout its history. This includes the aforementioned names of caramel shortbread and chocolate caramel shortbread, as well as millionaire's shortbread, caramel slice, caramel squares, or millionaire's slice. The name "millionaire's shortbread" appears to have originated in Scotland. The "millionaire" prefix to millionaire's shortbread or millionaires slice implies a level of decadence and wealth to the sweet treat, that it is an upgrade from regular shortbread.

== Variations ==
Many different variations of caramel shortbread exist to cater to different tastes, dietary requirements, and ingredient availability. Some variants include using white rather than milk chocolate for the topping, adding espresso and hazelnut, substituting shortbread for Anzac biscuits, adding raisins to the shortbread, or topping with peanut butter instead of chocolate. Some recipes adjust the recipe to cater to dietary requirements. Gluten-free and vegan versions exist.

== See also ==
- Twix
- Shortbread
- List of shortbread biscuits and cookies
