= Corn cookie =

Baked good made from corn, often sweet

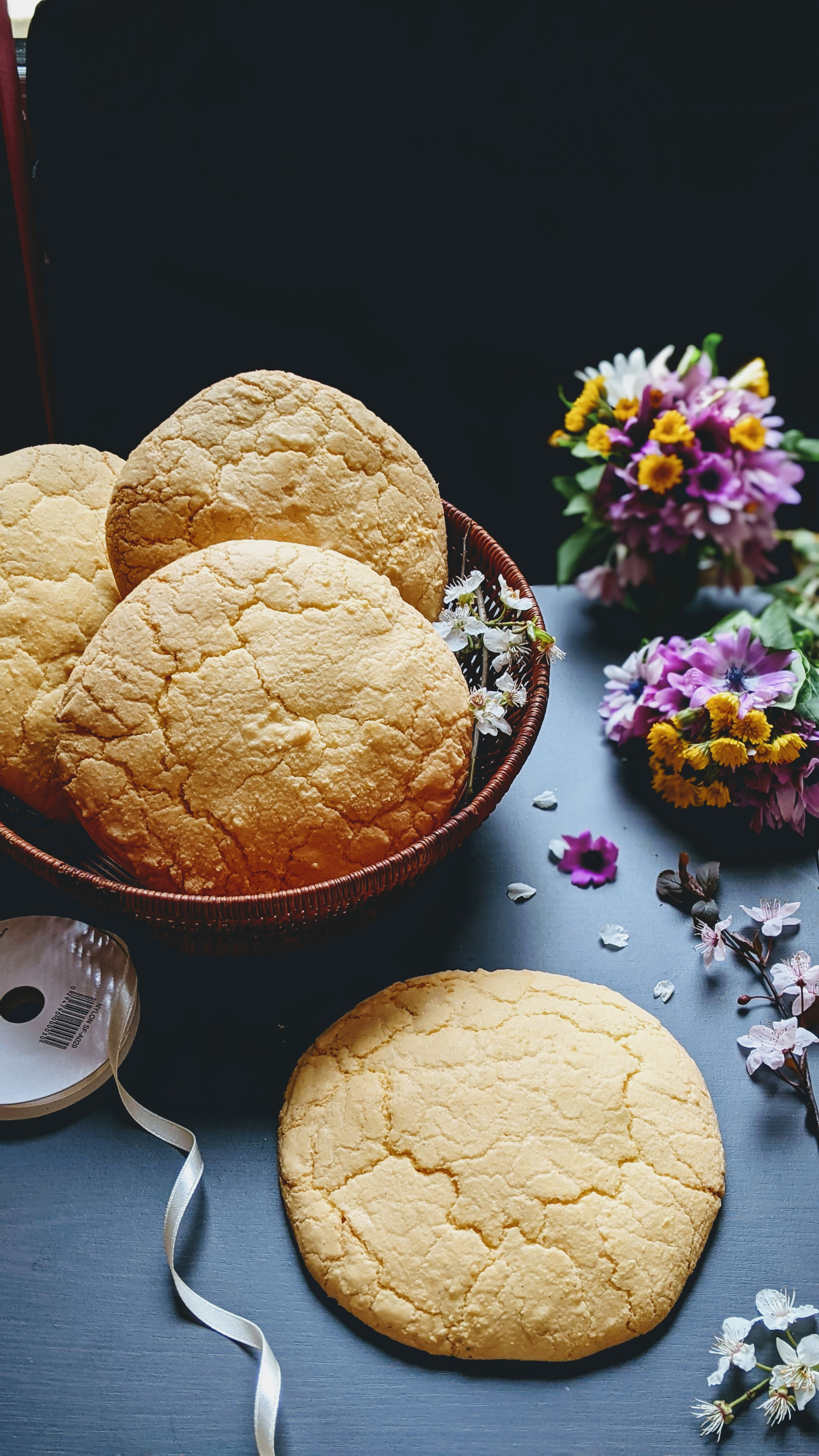
- Traditional corn cookie from Elbasan, Albania
- Alternative names: Ballokume (Albania)
- Type: Sugar cookie
- Place of origin: United States and Indonesia
- Main ingredients: Cornmeal, maize products

A corn cookie (or maize cookie) is a type of cookie prepared with corn products. In the United States and Indonesia, it is a type of sugar cookie.

Rather than wheat flour, which is commonly used in the preparation of cookies, the corn cookie takes its color and flavor from corn products such as cornmeal.

== Flavor ==
Like their traditional counterparts, corn cookies are often flavored with various herbs, spices, and fruits including lemon verbena, apricot, and rosemary.

In addition to baking, corn cookies can also be prepared by using batter for making cornbread and cooking it on a hot griddle.

Corn cookies have been prepared by the Sioux Indians in South Dakota due to the abundance of corn in that state.

== See also ==
- Corn fritters
- Johnnycake
- List of maize dishes
- Sandies
