= Sablé (biscuit) =

French shortbread cookie

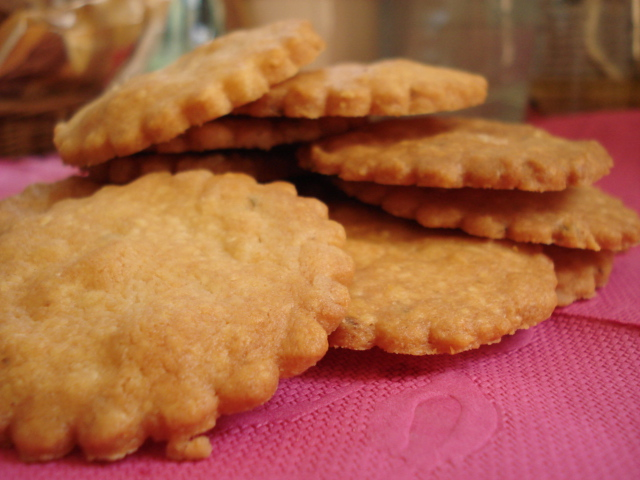
- Sablé with Parmesan cheese and green pepper
- Type: Biscuit
- Place of origin: France
- Region or state: Caen, Normandy
- Main ingredients: Shortbread

Sablé (also known as Breton shortbread) is a French round shortbread biscuit that might have originated in Sablé-sur-Sarthe in Sarthe.

== History ==
According to the letters of the Marquise de Sévigné, the biscuit was maybe created for the first time in Sablé-sur-Sarthe in 1670.

The French word sablé means "sandy", a rough equivalent of English "breadcrumbs". Generally, the baker begins the process by rubbing cold butter into flour and sugar to form particles of dough until the texture resembles that of breadcrumbs or sand.

== Recipe ==
Among the most well-known sablé recipes are those of La Mère Poulard, and the biscuits of Saint-Michel and Pont-Aven.

Sablés can be flavoured with almonds, lemon, parmesan, green pepper, or orange zest.

== See also ==
- List of shortbread biscuits and cookies
- Sandies
