= Nankhatai =

South Asian baked good

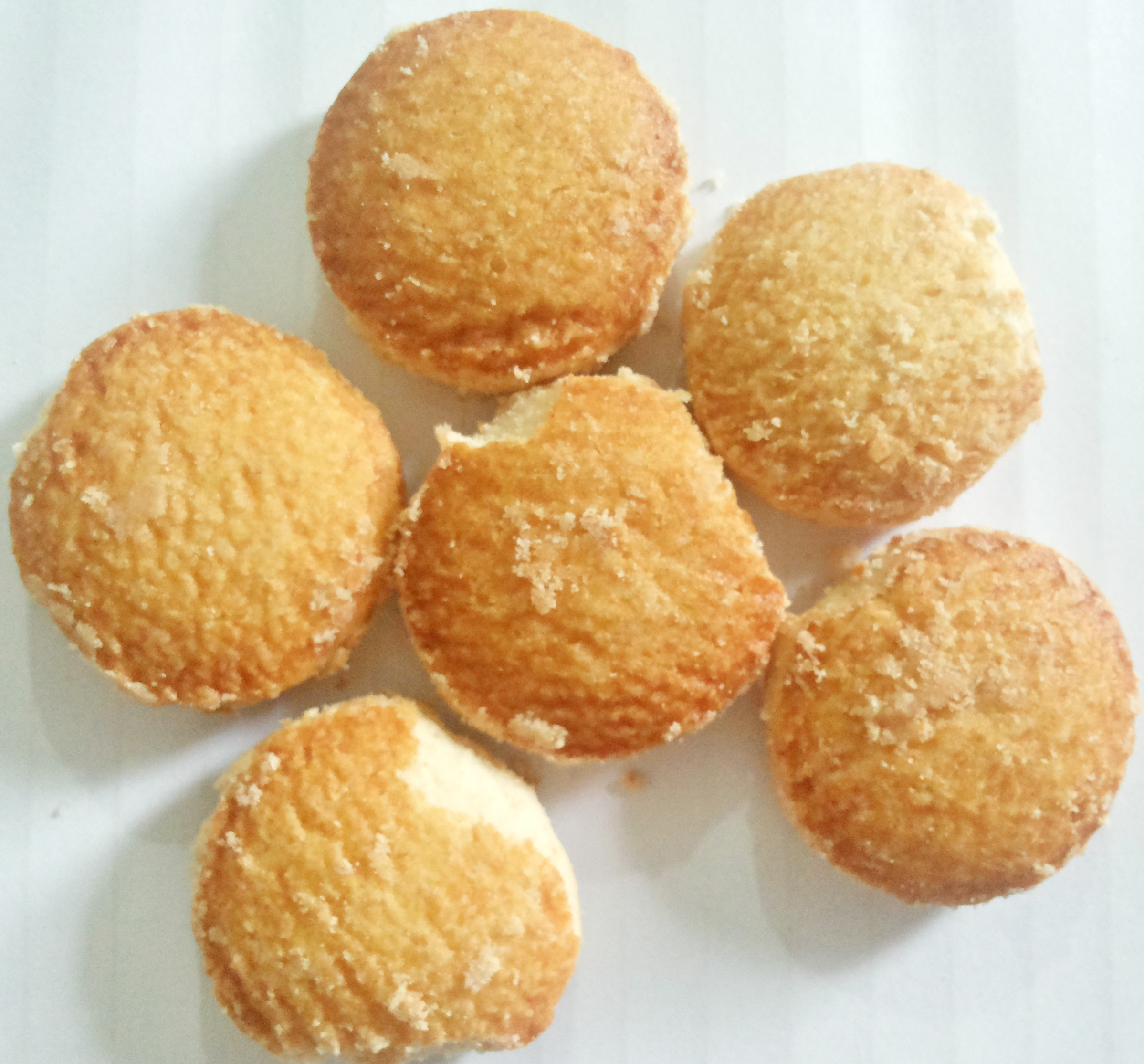
- Alternative names: Kulcha-i khaṭāʾī
- Type: Shortbread
- Region or state: Indian Subcontinent
- Associated cuisine: Indian, Pakistani, Bangladeshi
- Main ingredients: Wheat flour, rice flour, butter, powdered sugar, milk or yogurt, salt, honey, baking powder, semolina

Nankhatai (Bengali: নানখাতাই; Burmese: နံကထိုင်; Hindustani: नानख़ताई (Hindi) ਨਾਨ ਖਟਾਈ (Punjabi) / نان خطائی (Urdu); Sinhala: ඥාණකතා; Tamil: நானஹத்தா) are shortbread biscuits originating in the Indian subcontinent, common in Northern India, Pakistan, Bangladesh, Sri Lanka, and Myanmar (formerly Burma).

== Etymology ==
The word nankhatai is derived from the Classical Persian نانِ خطائی nān-i khaṭāʾī, lit. 'Cathayan bread, bread of Cathay [northern China]', composed of نان nān meaning 'bread' and خطائی khaṭāʾī meaning 'Cathayan'. The word has been borrowed into the Burmese language as nankahtaing (နံကထိုင်), in the Tamil language (in East Tamil Nadu) as naanahatha (நானஹத்தா), and in the Sinhala language (in Sri Lanka) as gnanakatha (ඥාණකතා).

In Afghanistan and northeastern Iran, these biscuits are called کلچهٔ خطائی kulcha-i khaṭāʾī in Persian (kulcha is a type of Afghan, Iranian and Indian bread similar to nān).

It is also a mispronunciation of نانِ کوتاہ naan-e-kotah – shortbread where نان naan means Bread, and کوتاہ kotah means short. So it's a bread which is taken as a snack for settling the 'false' hunger. To support this claim, کوتاہی kotahi in Urdu means mistake – shortcoming. کوتاہ نظرکوتاہ بین kotah–nazar in Urdu /kotah–been in Persian means shortsighted, someone who doesn't anticipate complex or far fetched outcomes. So Nan-e-Kotahi became Nan-e-Khatai or simply Nan-Khatai as it is easier to say Khatai than Kothai.

Nankhatai was also spelt nuncatie in English.

== History ==
Nankhatai is believed to have originated in India in the 16th century, when Dutch and Indians were the important spice traders. The main ingredients in nankhatai are refined flour, chickpea flour and semolina. Some recipes do not use chickpea flour.

== See also ==
- List of shortbread biscuits and cookies
- Polvorón
