= List of shortbread biscuits and cookies =

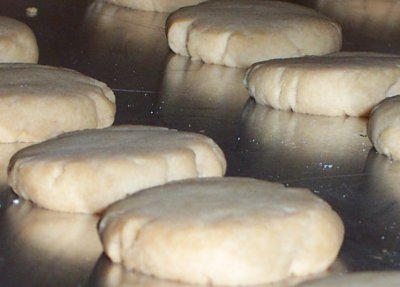
Cooked shortbread rounds

This is a list of shortbread biscuits and cookies. Shortbread is a type of biscuit or cookie traditionally made from one part sugar, two parts butter, and three parts flour as measured by weight. Shortbread originated in Scotland; the first recorded recipe was by a Scotswoman named Mrs McLintock and printed in 1736.

Several varieties of shortbread exist, including mass-produced shortbread. Some stray from the classic recipe by adding ground rice or cornflour or cornstarch in addition to white wheat flour to alter the texture. Others may add salt to the ingredients, or split the sugar into equal parts granulated sugar and icing or powdered sugar.

== Shortbread biscuits and cookies ==
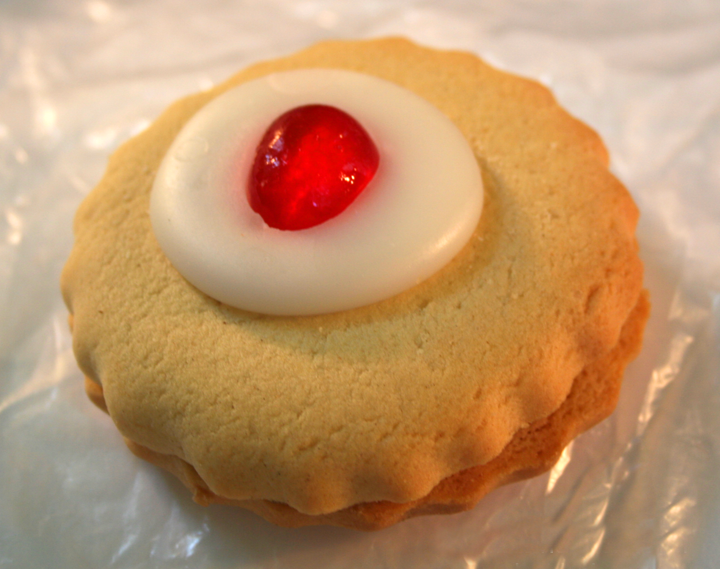
An Empire biscuit

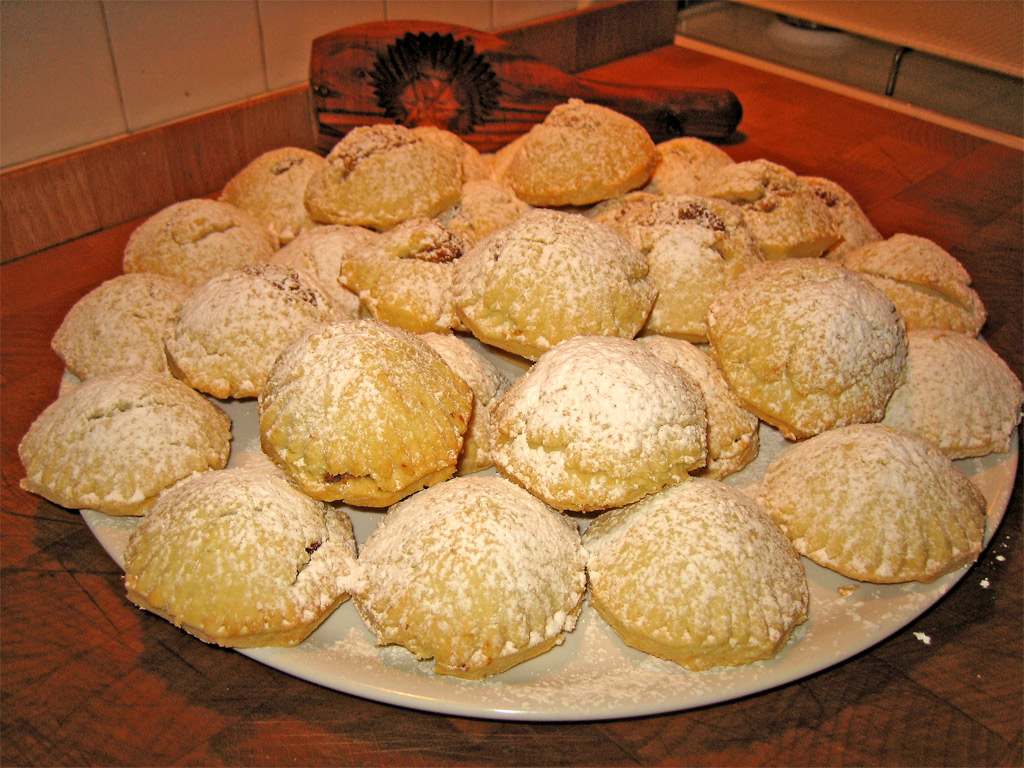
Ma'amoul

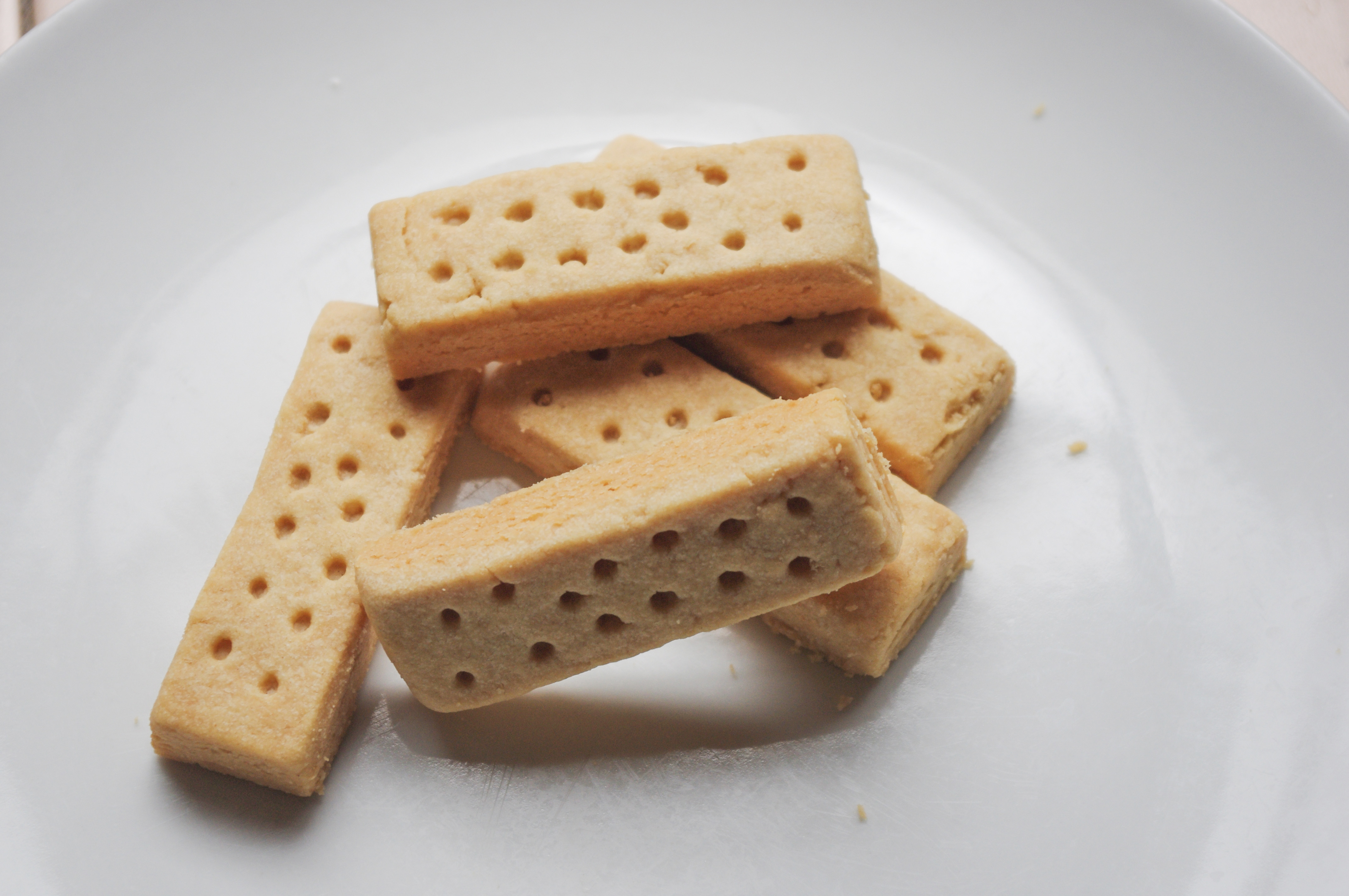
Walkers Shortbread fingers

- Berger Cookies – made and distributed by DeBaufre Bakeries, they are topped with a thick layer of chocolate fudge that derives from a German recipe, and are a cultural icon of Baltimore, Maryland. Its recipe was brought to America from Germany by George and Henry Berger in 1835.
- Caramel shortbread – a biscuit confectionery item composed of a rectangular shortbread biscuit base topped with a very soft caramel filling and a milk chocolate topping.
- Countess – small, slightly sweet shortbread that is typical of French Guianan cuisine.
- E.L. Fudge – an American snack food manufactured by the Keebler Company.
- Empire biscuit – a sweet biscuit popular in the United Kingdom, particularly Scotland, and other Commonwealth countries, it is also popular in Northern Ireland.
- Ghoriba – a round, shortbread cookie prepared in the Maghreb and other parts of the Middle East.
- Hallongrotta – a common Swedish cookie made with butter, flour, baking powder, sugar and vanilla, usually filled with raspberry jam.
- Hello Panda – a brand of Japanese biscuit, manufactured by Meiji Seika.
- Jodenkoek – originating in the Netherlands, a big, flat, round shortbread cookie with a diameter of about 10 centimeters (3.9 in). It is claimed to have been first baked in the 17th century, and these cookies were advertised by bakeries as early as 1872.
- Kourabiedes – Greek shortbread.
- Lorna Doone – a brand produced by Nabisco.
- Ma'amoul – a shortbread cookie in Arab countries filled with dates, pistachios or walnuts (or occasionally almonds, figs, or other fillings).
- Nankhatai – shortbread biscuits popular in India and Pakistan.
- Polvorón – a type of heavy, soft and very crumbly Spanish shortbread made of flour, sugar, milk, and nuts, specially almonds.
- Qurabiya – a shortbread-type biscuit originating from Iranian Azerbaijan, usually made with ground almonds. Several regional variations exist.
- Repostería – a Mexican type of shortbread-like cookie that is lightly baked and dipped into a cinnamon sugar blend until the cinnamon sugar surrounds the cookie. These are often served with coffee or hot spiced Mexican chocolate.
- Royal Dansk – a brand of butter cookie produced in Denmark by the Kelsen Group since 1966, and widely exported in a distinctive blue tin featuring an image of the Hjemstavnsgaard farmhouse on the island of Funen.
- Sablé – a French round shortbread cookie that originates in Sablé-sur-Sarthe, in Sarthe.
- Shrewsbury biscuits/cookies – Originated and are still made in the historic town of Shrewsbury, England. It is a rich shortbread made with butter, sugar, flour, egg and aroma, often enhanced with currants. The first Shrewsbury biscuits recipe was printed in London in 1658, in a book titled: 'The Compleat Cook'.
- Sandies – a shortbread cookie. A commercial variety is manufactured by the Keebler Company.
- Tao su (桃酥) - a shortbread cookie originated north eastern part of China that trace back to the beginning of Tang dynasty in the 7th century, made out of tightly compounded ingredients in a bite-sized mold before baking; ingredients are mainly ground and granulated walnuts and granulated sugar, occasionally, depending on the regions and varieties, mixing in wheat flour and lard.
- Trefoils – a small shortbread cookie with vanilla flavoring created for sale by Girl Scouts of the USA.
- Viennese Whirls – a soft shortbread biscuit, commonly filled with buttercream and jam.
Various shortbreads

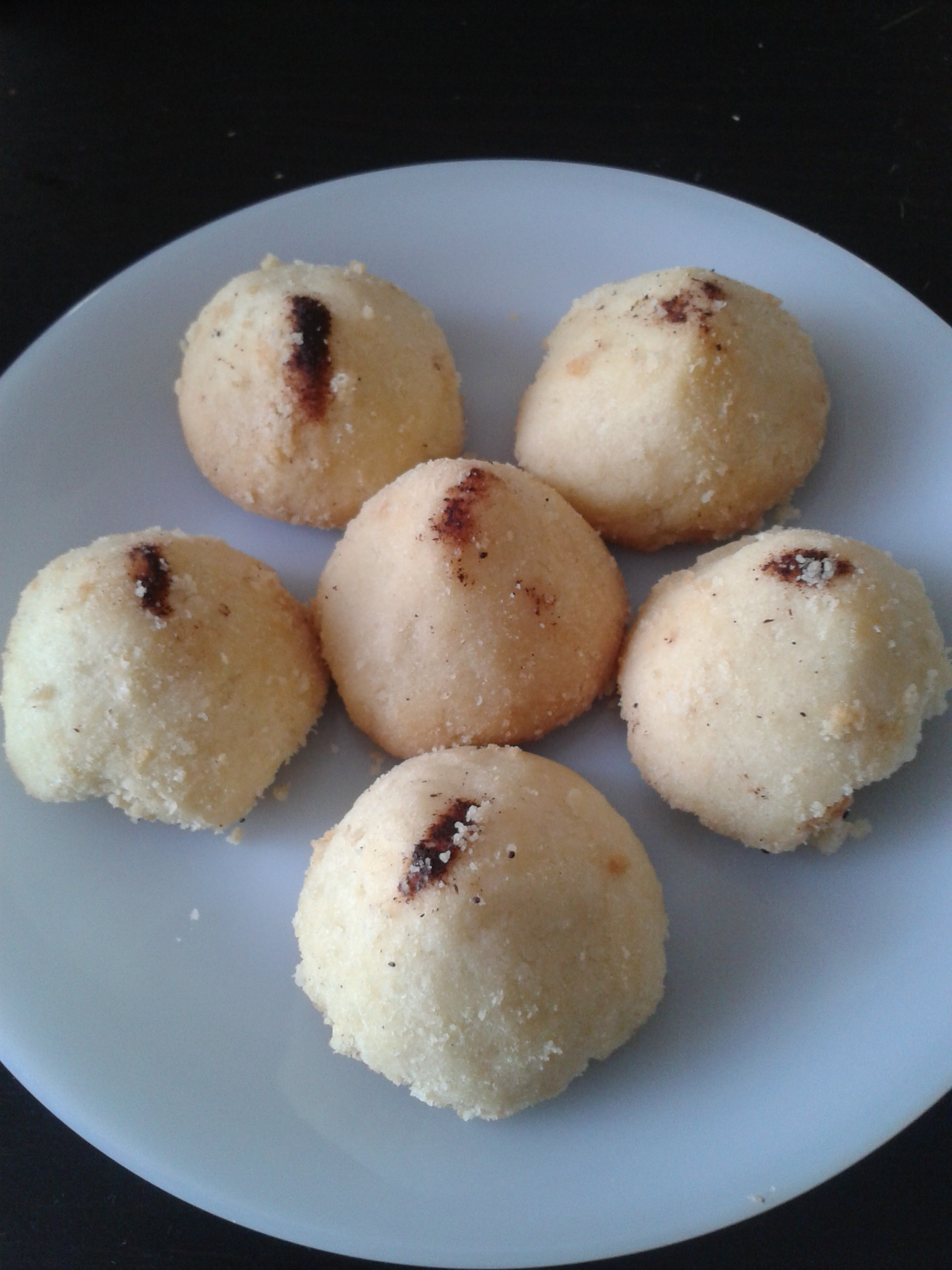
Ghoriba

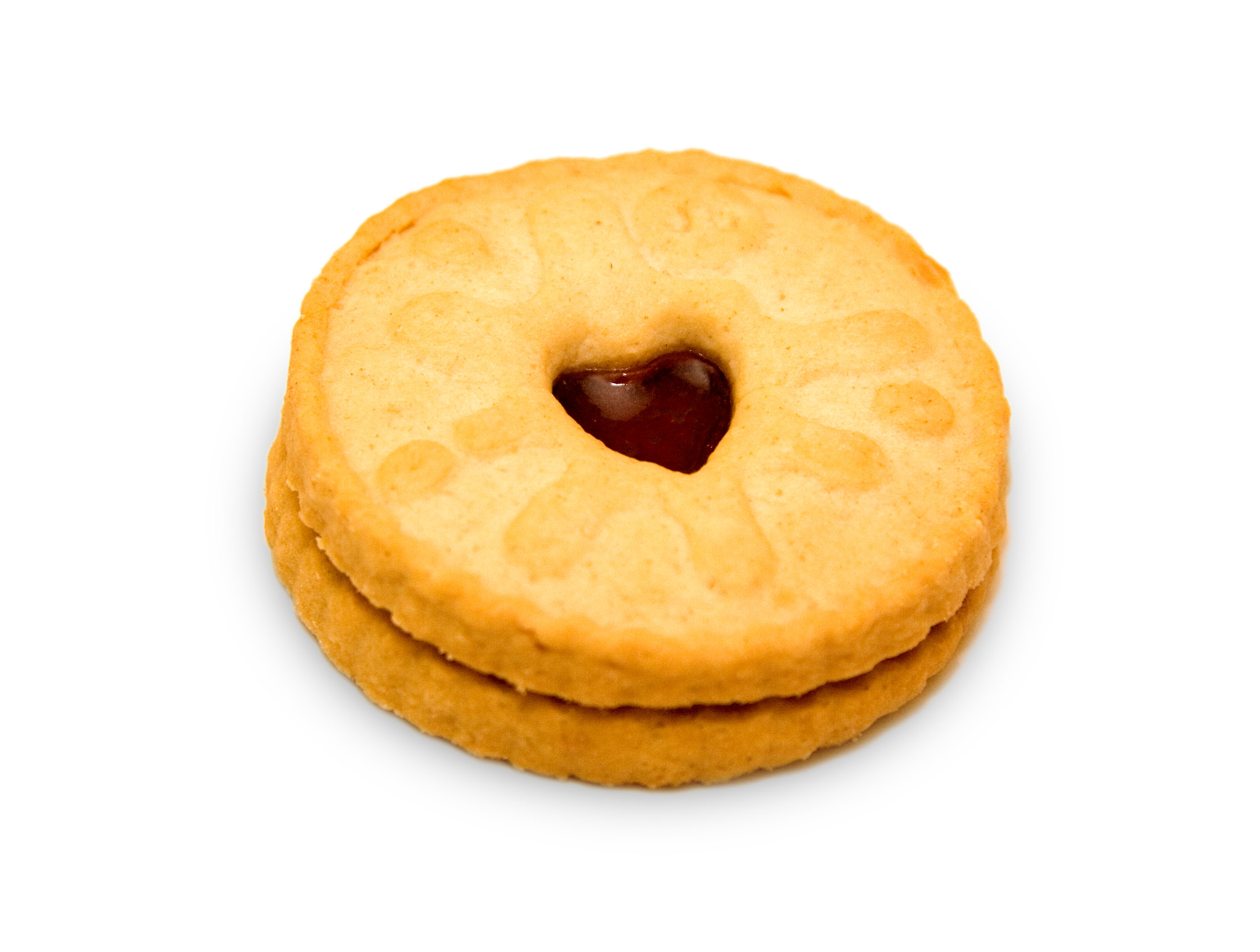
A Jammie Dodger

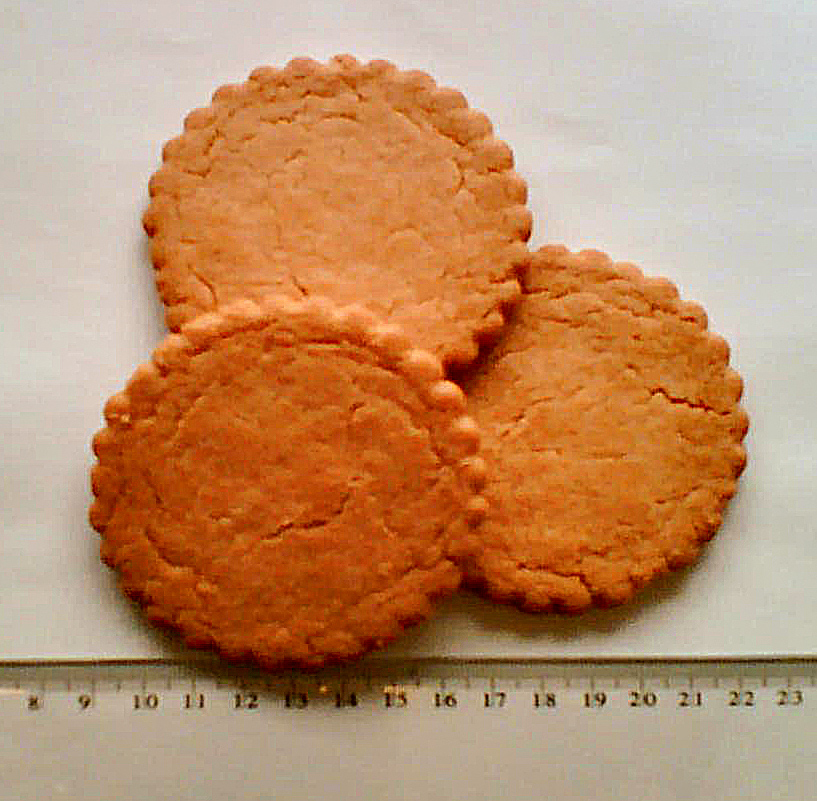
Jodenkoek

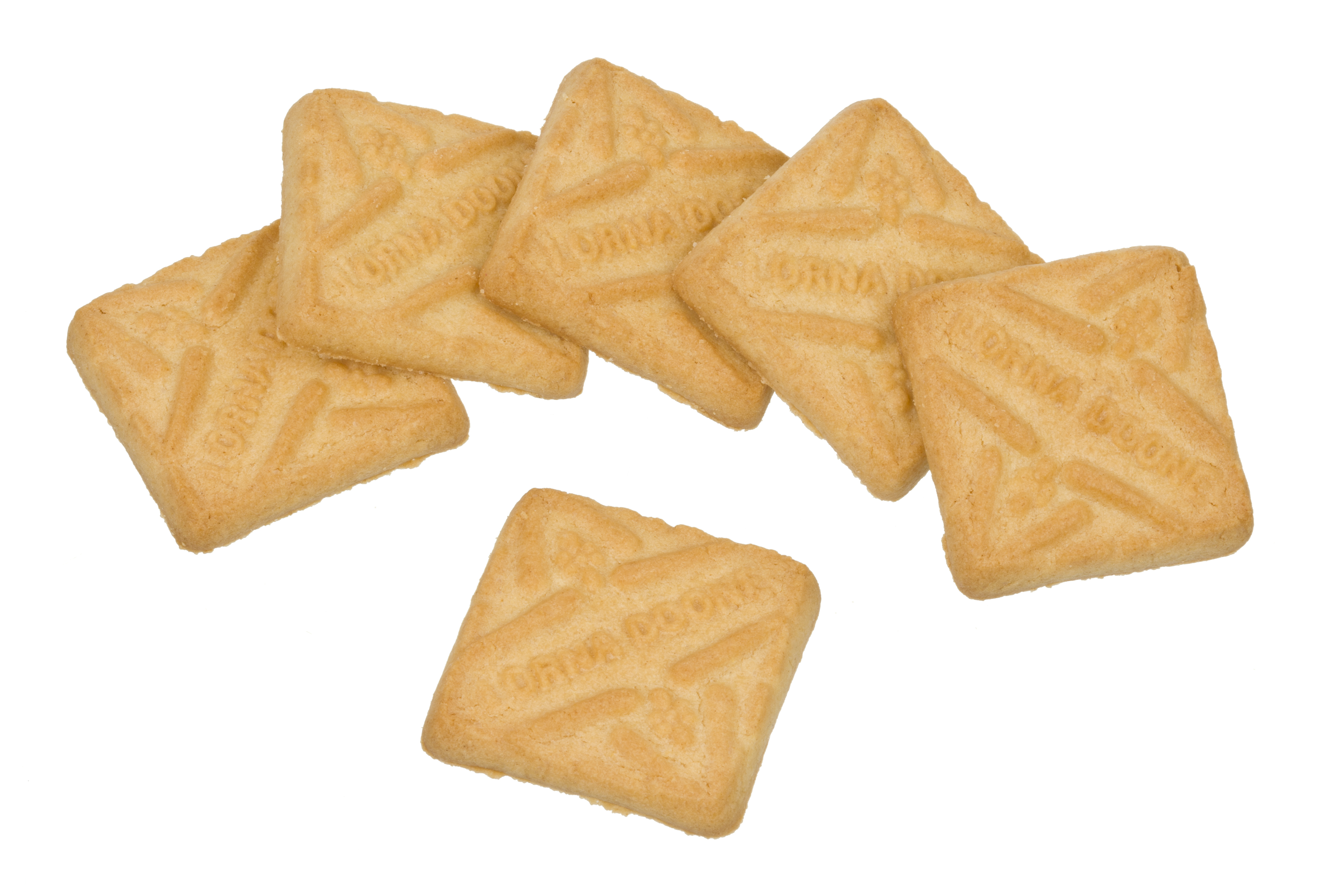
Lorna Doone cookies

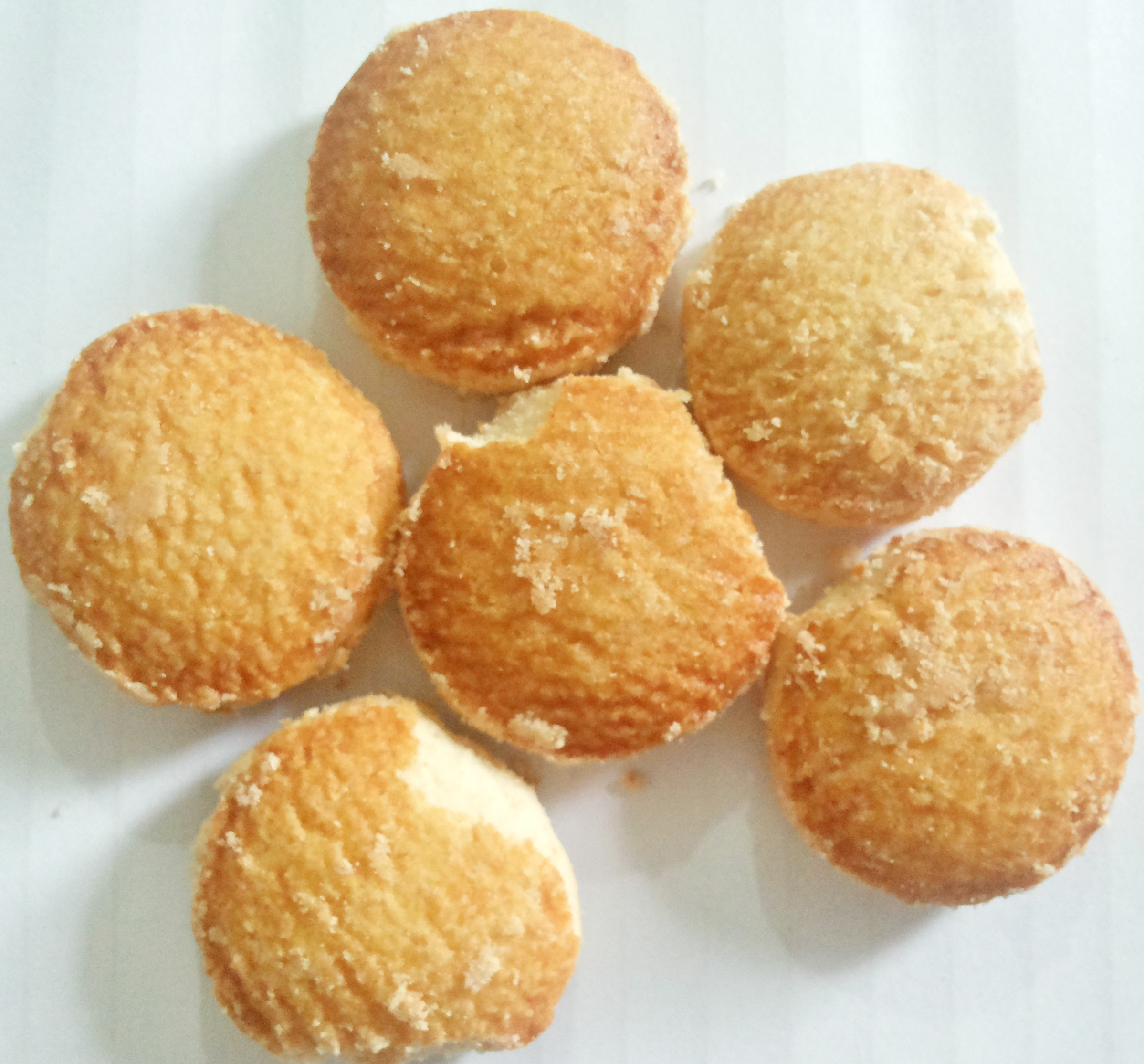
Nankhatai

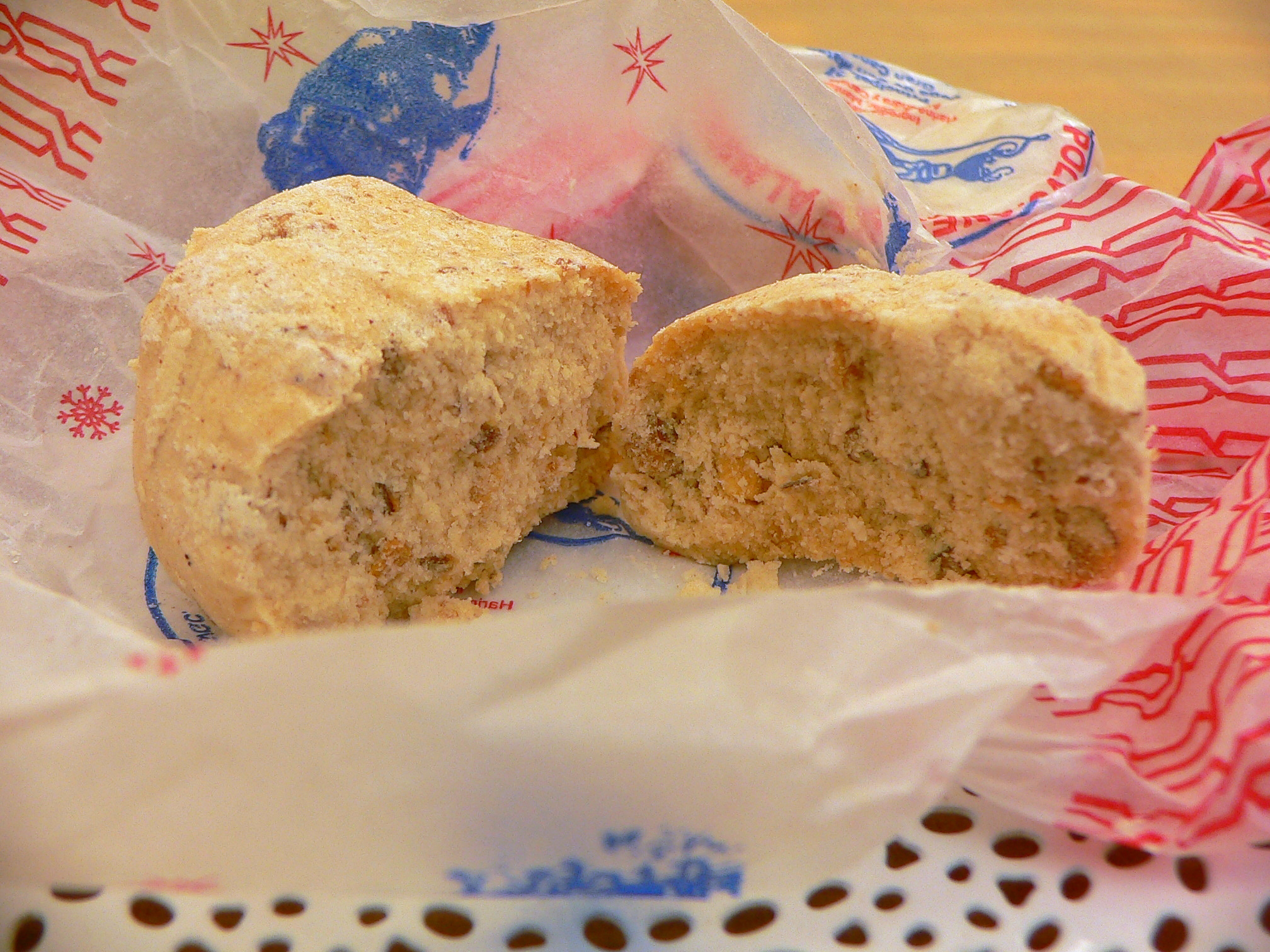
A polvorón

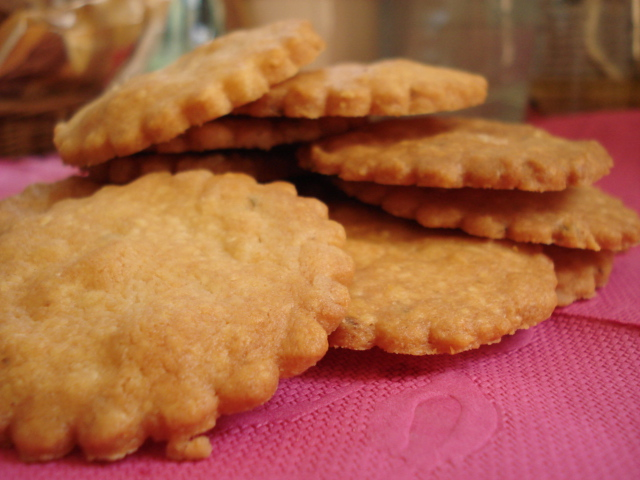
Sablé with Parmesan cheese and green pepper

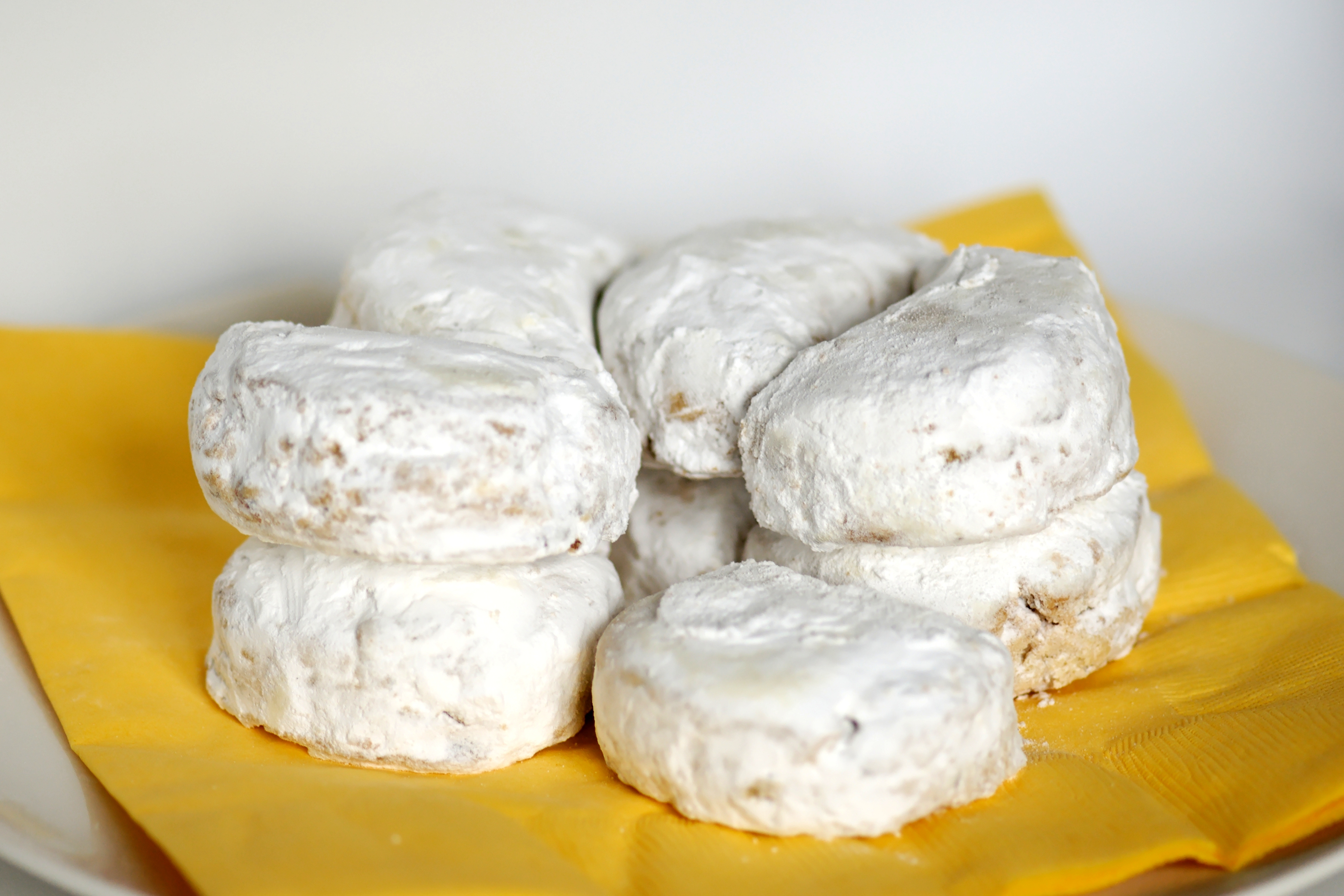
Kourabiedes

== See also ==
- Chinsuko
- Carac – a Swiss dessert pastry prepared with a shortbread crust
- Jaffa Cakes – 1991 UK court finding to be considered cakes and not biscuits for tax purposes
- List of baked goods
- List of cookies
- Shortcake
- Vínarterta – a multi-layered cake made from alternating layers of white vanilla- or cardamom-flavoured shortbread and plum jam
