= Cinnamon sugar =

Spice mix made up of ground cinnamon and granulated sugar

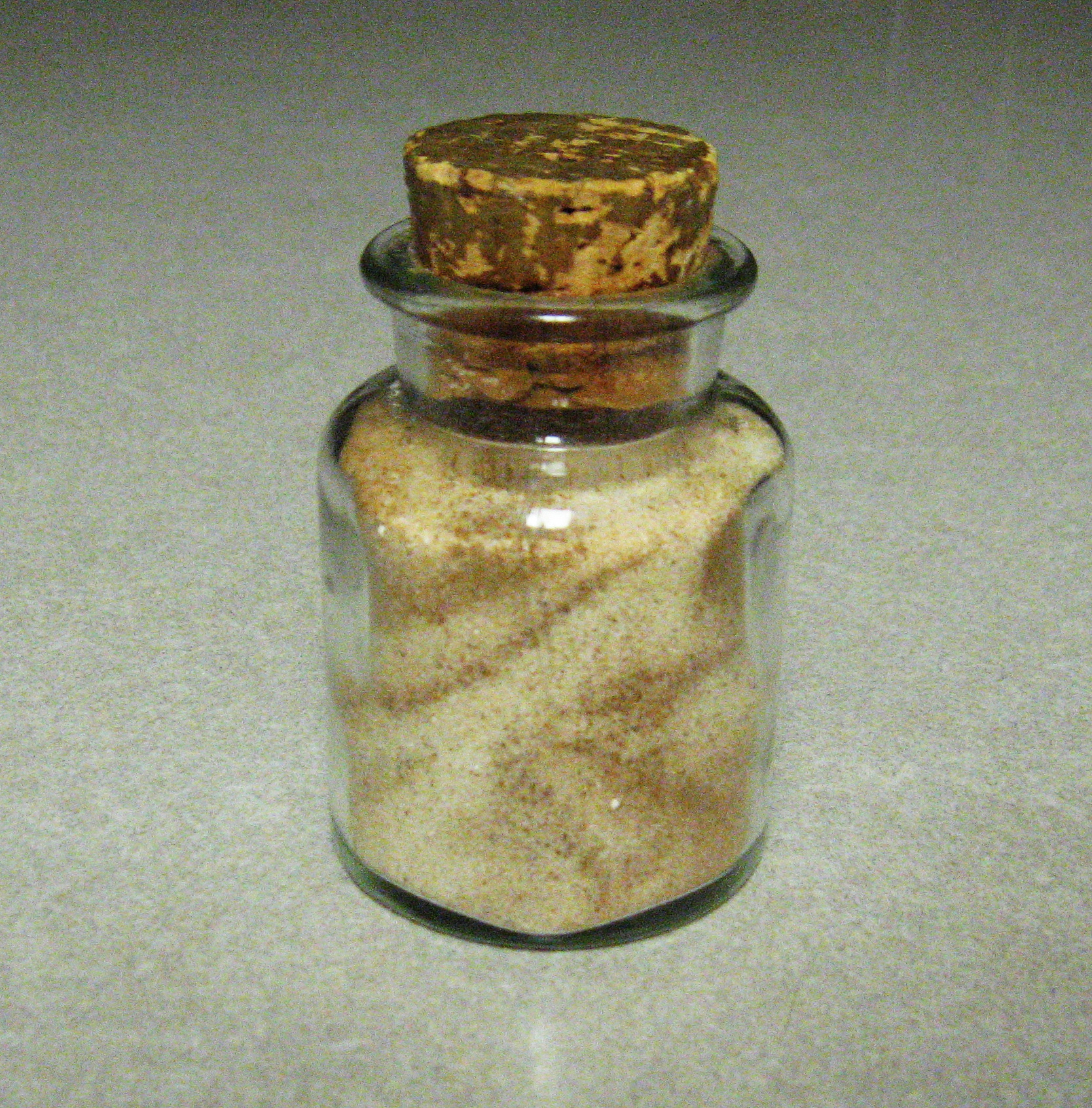
A bottle of homemade cinnamon sugar

Cinnamon sugar is a mixture of ground cinnamon and granulated sugar used as a spice to flavor foods such as Belgian waffles, Snickerdoodle cookies, tortillas, coffee cake, French toast, and churros. It is also used to flavor apples, cereals, and other fruits.

== History ==
It is not known when the term "cinnamon sugar" first came about. Some books, like Bernard Fantus's "Candy Medication" in 1915, mention it. Fantus writes about "red cinnamon sugar" as one of the products created for medical purposes. But others, like an 1891 book of vegetarian cooking, do not. The latter book, in describing a recipe for apple custard, describes how "a little cinnamon sugar can be shaken over the top" is the appropriate topping. Apart from this, one of the earliest uses of the term "cinnamon sugar" is within the "book of cookery" used by Martha Washington and her descendants, purchased by the Historical Society of Pennsylvania in 1892. In a recipe for stewing warden's pears, the spice mixture is directly mentioned: "Boyle them first in faire water, then pare & stew them between 2 dishes of cinnamon sugar and rose water, or the same seasoning you may put them in a pie and bake them."

In 1846, Charles Elme Francatelli, a British cook of Italian descent, published a cookbook in which he described shaking "some cinnamon sugar" on the surface of "cherry bread" (a British bread), German "Kouglauff," a German tourte of apricots, and on a brown-bread soufflé. 18 years later, in 1865, J.E. Tilton's cookbook talked about how the create the spice mixture, recommended that it be on eggs, and baked with as a possible replacement of "vanilla sticks." By 1881 J.E. Thompson Gill's cookbook still recommended how the mix could be made, but recommended it be applied on pound cakes instead. 17 years later, in 1898, a cooking encyclopedia would refer to the spice mixture when talking about cinnamon sticks and other desserts. In 1907, Hotel Monthly published a cookbook that mentioned cinnamon sugar as a topping for French Baba, a type of cake. This was followed by the National Baker writing, in 1913, about the sprinkling of this mixture on "Parisian Cake."

During the 1920s and 1930s, the term "cinnamon sugar" was used in reference to cooking, primarily recommended as a garnish on desserts. While this spice mixture was mentioned in The New Zealand Journal of Agriculture in 1955, it would primarily appear in U.S.-publications, like the Illinois Rural Electric News in 1959, American Home in 1964, and the American Sugar Crystal Company's Crystal-ized Facts in 1967. In the 1970s and 1980s, the spice mixture was integrated into many cookbooks, and other publications, becoming a common topping for dessert dishes. By the early 1990s, cinnamon sugar within books about early childhood education and in a cookbook of the fraternity Beta Sigma Phi.

In the 21st century, the term has remained as staple of cookbooks, mostly when it comes to desserts, including vegan recipes.

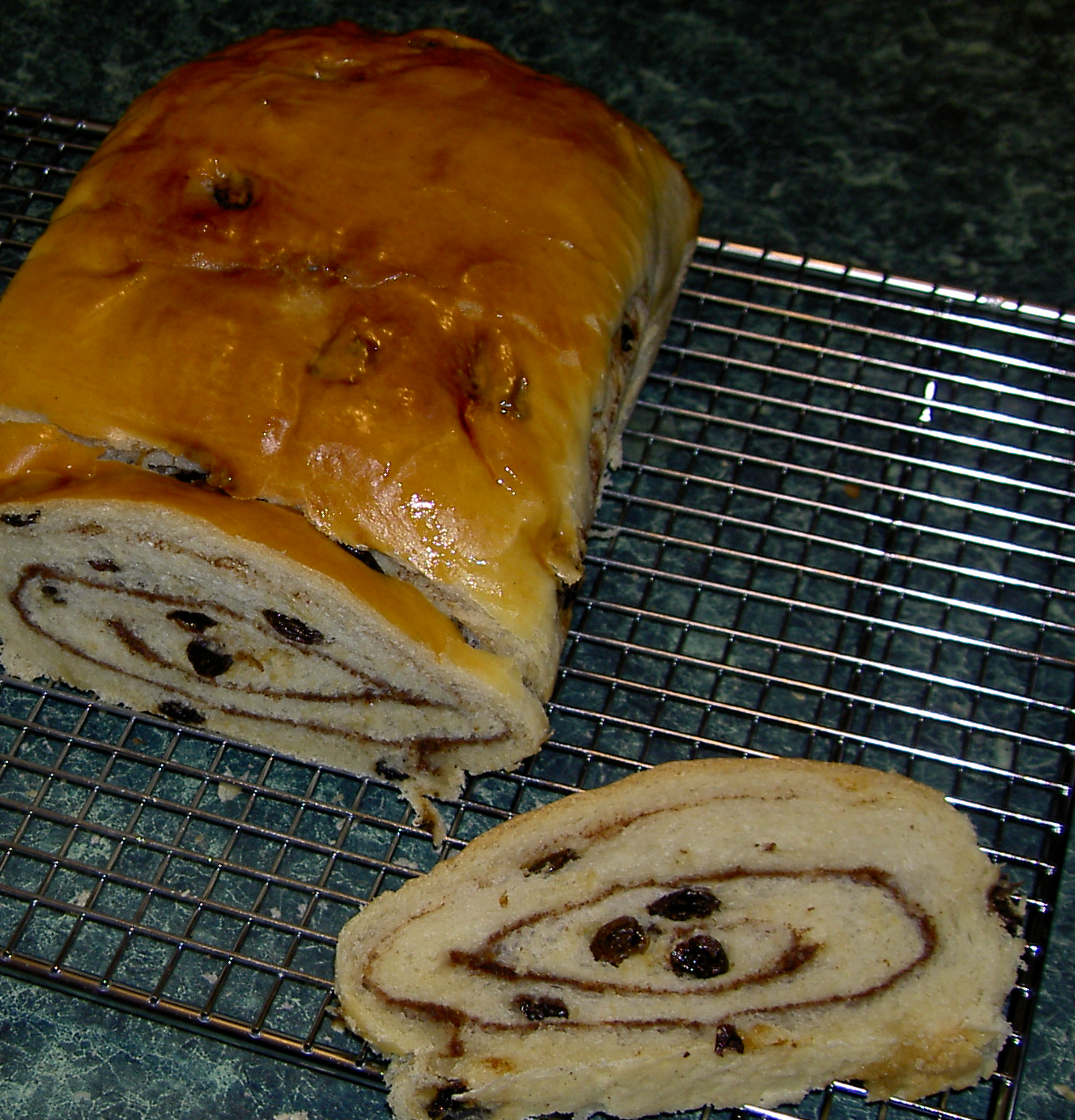
Raisin bread with cinnamon sugar swirled in the dough.

== Use ==
This spice mixture has not only been used to flavor funnel cakes and other treats, but it has been mentioned in patents and as part of recipes. The latter is where many results of the term derive, as the term "cinnamon sugar" is often used in cookbooks. This spice mixture has also been used in scientific studies about bean flour, a natural remedy of cinnamon sugar to "treat" dermatitis, and others, while being part of the promotional materials of companies like King Arthur Flour. There is currently a propellant developed for astronauts which has the moniker of "cinnamon sugar." Poems have mentioned the spice mixture as well, like Nancy Gillespie Westerfield's 1976 work, which talks about how the main character toasted her bread with the spice mixture, reminding her of "sweet things" from her girlhood, or Mel Vavra's 2001 work, which poses the protagonist as "a Cinnamon-Sugar girl."

In the United States cinnamon and sugar are "often used to flavour cereals, bread-based dishes, and fruits, especially apples," while in the Middle East cinnamon is "often used in savory dishes of chicken and lamb" and in the preparation of chocolate in Mexico. In South Africa there is a famous dessert pastry called melktert which is "lightly flavoured with cinnamon sugar."
