= Wim Kortenoeven =

Dutch politician

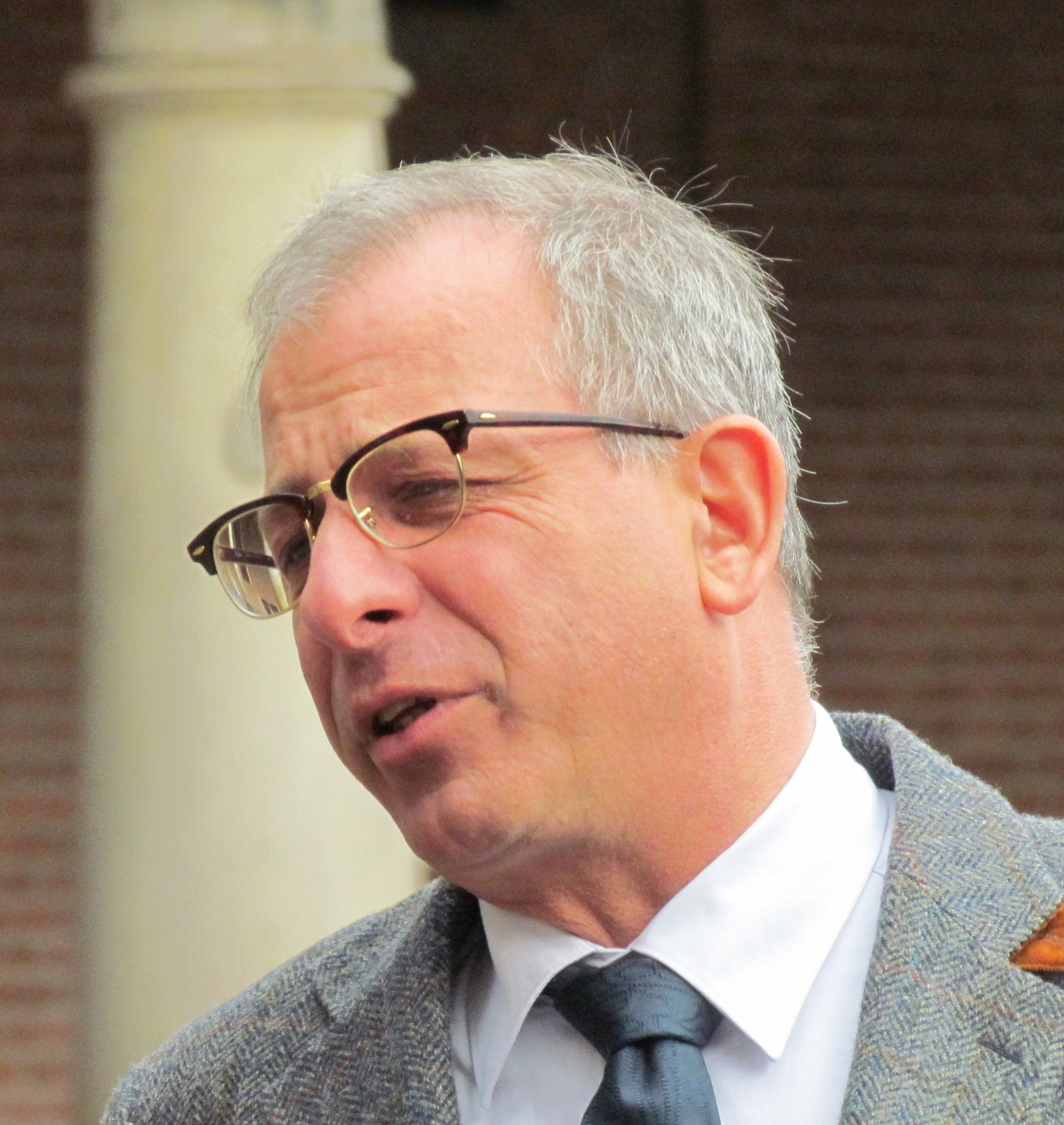

Member of the House of Representatives
- In office 17 June 2010 – 19 September 2012

Personal details
- Born: Robert Frank Willem Kortenoeven; 29 May 1955 (age 71) Voorburg, Netherlands
- Party: Party for Freedom (2010–12); Independent (2012)
- Education: Leiden University (M.A. in political science)
- Occupation: Politician, author, journalist

Robert Frank Willem "Wim" Kortenoeven (born 29 May 1955) is a Dutch author, journalist and former politician.

Kortenoeven engages in political developments in the Middle East, focusing on the Arab-Israeli conflict. He also writes about Jewish history. On these subjects he gives lectures and guest lectures and contributes to Israël-Aktueel, the monthly magazine of the Dutch foundation Christians for Israel.

He is a supporter of the State of Israel as well as Judaism and strongly opposes Islam and Arab and other supposed adversaries of Israel, like Iran, and has said that Islam is the most important negative factor in the Israeli peace process. He is director of the pro-Israel lobby organisation Netherlands-Israel Public Affairs Committee (NIPAC), a Dutch equivalent of the American Israel Public Affairs Committee (AIPAC).

== Biography ==
Kortenoeven studied political science at Leiden University and history (unfinished) at the Dutch Open University.

He worked twice in an Israeli kibbutz: in 1976 in kibbutz Nahshon and in 1981 in kibbutz Matzuva. In the meantime he worked at Holland International, a Dutch travel agency. In the 1980s he was active in the Dutch care sector. From 1988 to 1991 he was director of Dutchlink Sales Representation.

From 1991 to 2000 Kortenoeven was involved in journalism activities and project advisory, both in the Netherlands, the United States and Israel. From 2000 to 2010 he was an employee of Centrum Informatie en Documentatie Israël (CIDI), a Dutch centre providing information about Israel.

On 17 June 2010 he became a member of the House of Representatives for the Party for Freedom (Partij voor de Vrijheid). As an MP he focused on matters of foreign policy (Middle East, Russia and Asia) and the armed forces of the Netherlands. In parliament he criticised Islam and Turkish Prime Minister Recep Tayyip Erdogan, referred to Istanbul as "Constantinople", and called for "preventive action" against Iran's nuclear installations by Israel and the United States. He has been described as part of the counter-jihad movement.

Being the only member of his party to vote against banning ritual slaughter (both a Jewish and Muslim practice), Kortenoeven announced on 3 July 2012, in the wake of a press conference by Geert Wilders, that he had just left the PVV due to internal struggles. He did so together with fellow MP Marcial Hernandez. They formed the Kortenoeven/Hernandez Group, that was in Parliament until 19 September 2012 (after the general elections, in which they didn't take part). Although unhappy with Wilders' "authoritarian" leadership style, he has later said that "I left his party, but that doesn't mean that I disagree with him. I disagree with the way he wants to solve things without offering real solutions," and that he "remains sympathetic to its aims".

== Bibliography ==
- De kern van de zaak: feiten en achtergronden van het Arabisch-Israëlisch conflict, Soesterberg, Aspekt, 2005, ISBN 90-5911-349-7 (about the Arab-Israeli conflict)
- Hamas: portret en achtergronden, Soesterberg, Aspekt, 2007, ISBN 978-90-5911-294-0 (about Palestinian militant group Hamas)
- Mohammed Amin El Hoesseini: Hitlers Palestijnse bondgenoot, Soesterberg, Aspekt, 2008, ISBN 978-90-5911-707-5 (about Palestinian Muslim leader Haj Amin al-Husseini)
