= Snickerdoodle =

Cookie

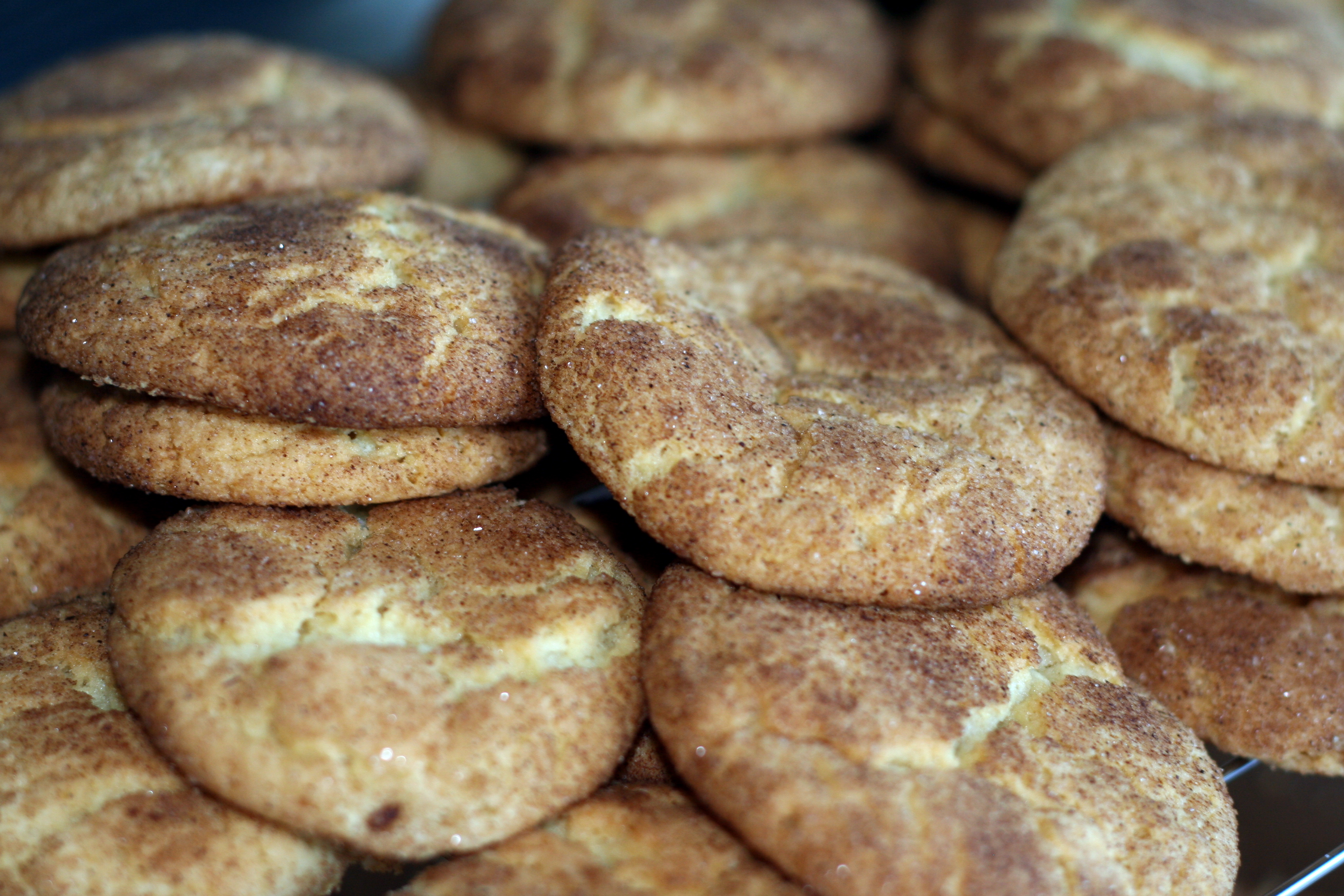
- Type: Cookie
- Place of origin: United States
- Region or state: New England
- Main ingredients: Flour, butter or oil, sugar, cinnamon sugar, salt

A snickerdoodle is a type of cookie made with flour, fat, sugar, and salt, and rolled in cinnamon sugar. Other spice-sugar mixes may also be used, such as cardamom sugar or a mixture of cardamom, cinnamon, and allspice. Eggs may also sometimes be used as an ingredient, with cream of tartar and baking soda added to leaven the dough. Snickerdoodles are characterized by a cracked surface and can be either crisp or soft depending on the ingredients used.

While snickerdoodles may appear similar to "sugar cookies", traditional sugar cookies are often rolled in white sugar whereas snickerdoodles are rolled in a mixture of white sugar and cinnamon. Cream of tartar is added for its signature effect on texture and taste as another main difference. Sugar cookies usually contain only baking soda and/or baking powder, not tartar.

== Etymology ==
Joy of Cooking claims that snickerdoodles are probably German in origin, and that the name is a corruption of the German word Schneckennudel, a Palatine variety of Schnecken. It is also possible that the name is simply a nonsense word with no particular meaning, originating from a New England tradition of whimsical cookie names. The Oxford English Dictionary claims the word's origin is "uncertain", and possibly a compound of the word snicker, an onomatopoeic English word with Scottish roots that indicates a "smothered laugh", and doodle, a German loanword into English meaning a "simple or foolish fellow", originally derived from the Low German dudeltopf, meaning "simpleton, noodle, night-cap". The earliest use of the word recorded by the Oxford English Dictionary is from 1889.

== Ingredients ==
Snickerdoodles have traditionally been made with a blend of shortening and butter. Some updated modern recipes have replaced shortening (a hydrogenated fat) with different varieties of oil. Before being baked, the cookie dough balls are rolled in cinnamon sugar which can vary the intensity of cinnamon flavor, with some recipes using a 1:1 ratio of cinnamon to sugar. The process of making the cookie dough is similar to many other cookies; first the fat and sugar are creamed together until pale and fluffy, then an egg is whisked in, and the flour is added last. Some recipes recommend using cream of tartar as the raising agent, rather than baking soda, to give the cookie an extra tangy taste. Once the dough is mixed, it is divided into equal portions and each portion is rolled by hand to make a ball. Then each ball is rolled in a mixture of sugar and cinnamon. The spiced and sugared balls are then placed on baking paper on a baking tray, spaced well apart to allow for the ball to spread as it cooks, slightly candying the sugar and spice coating.

== Food trends ==
The cookie is common to Mennonite and Amish communities and was a favorite treat of the Indiana poet James Whitcomb Riley.

In more recent times, the snickerdoodle cookie has transformed into a popular flavor of desserts, sugary sweets, drinks, candies, etc. During the 2014 holiday season, Dunkin' Donuts unveiled a snickerdoodle cookie latte on their holiday menu. In addition to a snickerdoodle latte, Nestlé Coffee-Mate introduced their take on the cookie in the form of a coffee creamer. Brands such as Braum's Ice Cream and Prairie Farms have dedicated an ice cream flavor to the popular cookie.

== See also ==
- List of cookies
- Sandies
