= Butter cookie =

Cookie originating in Denmark

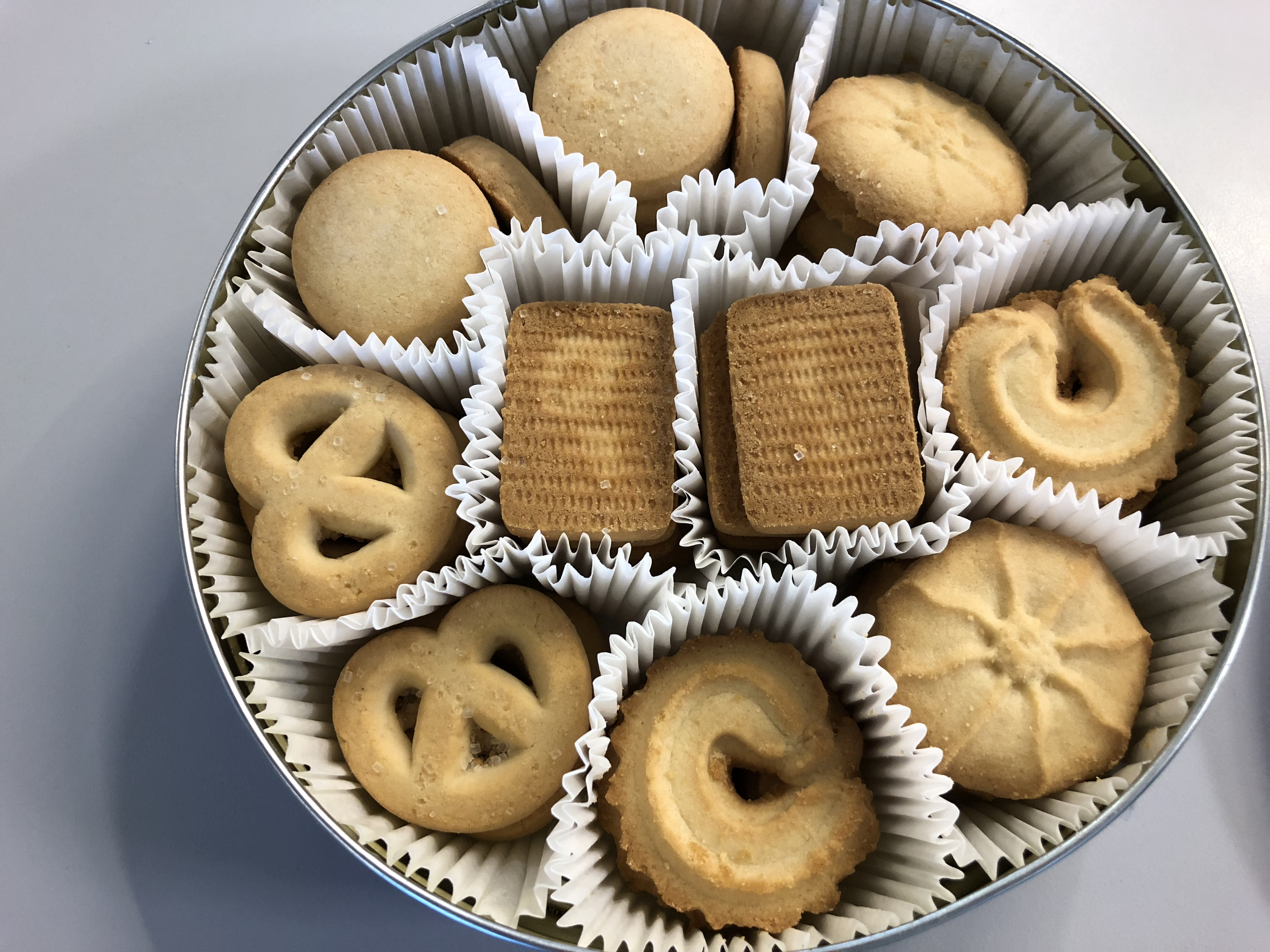
- Alternative names: Danish butter cookies
- Type: Cookie
- Place of origin: Denmark
- Main ingredients: Butter, flour, sugar

Butter cookies, also known as Danish butter cookies, are a type of cookie or biscuit originating in Denmark consisting of butter, flour, and sugar. They are similar to shortbread biscuit.

The butter cookie is often categorized as a "crisp cookie" due to its texture, caused in part by the quantity of butter and sugar. It is generally necessary to chill its dough to enable proper manipulation and handling.

Butter cookies at their most basic have no flavoring, but they are often flavored with vanilla, chocolate, cinnamon, or coconut, and/or topped with sugar crystals. They also come in a variety of shapes such as circles, squares, ovals, rings, and pretzel-like forms, and with a variety of appearances, including marbled, checkered or plain. Using piping bags, twisted shapes can be made.

== Production and exports ==
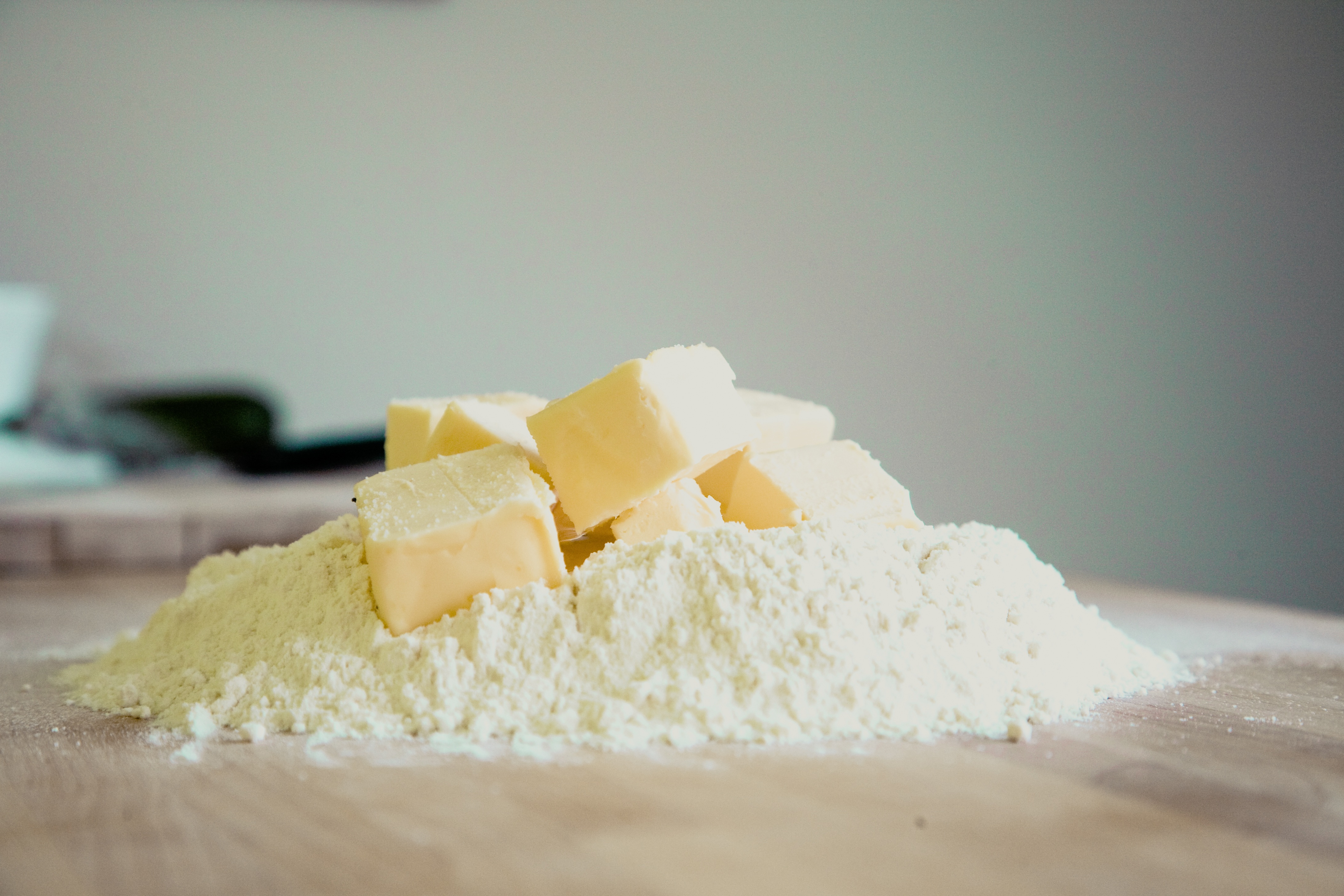
Butter and flour

The cookies are made in numerous varieties, with the most popular cookie shapes among different manufacturers being circles, rectangles, rings, and pretzel-like.

Exported industrial-grade butter cookies are typically packed and sold in cylindrical tins, filled 1–2 layers deep with cupcake/muffin baking cups that are each stacked with 5–6 cookies, with Royal Dansk being a notable example. Due to the uniform packaging and labeling of the cylindrical tin box, butter cookie packages are also known as "The Blue Tin". The tin itself has become a subject of popular culture due to its frequent reuse as a household storage container, particularly for sewing supplies or recipes. This practice has been widely documented in media and popular commentary and is often referenced humorously as a shared cultural experience.

Denmark has been a notable exporter of butter cookies for many years, in particular to the US and Asia. In some parts of the world, such as Europe and North America, butter cookies are often served around Christmas time. Butter cookies are also a very popular gift in Hong Kong, especially during Lunar New Year.

== See also ==
- Koulourakia
- Lengua de gato
- List of cookies
- Peanut butter cookie
- Petit-Beurre
- Shortbread
