= Shortbread =

Scottish biscuit

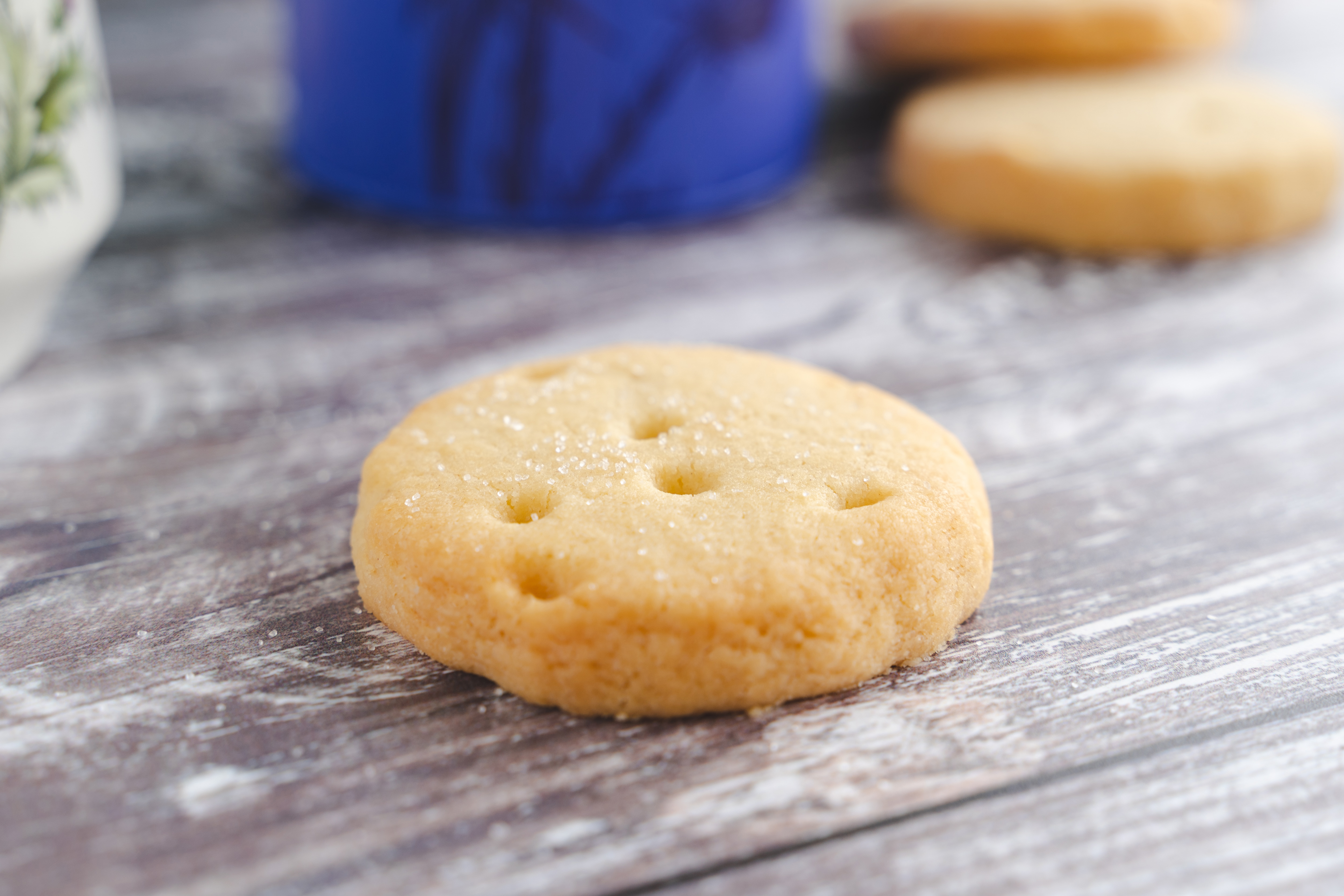
- A round shortbread
- Alternative names: shortie
- Type: Biscuit
- Place of origin: Scotland
- Main ingredients: Flour, butter, white sugar

Shortbread or shortie is a traditional Scottish biscuit usually made from one part white sugar, two parts butter and three to four parts plain wheat flour. Shortbread does not contain leavening, such as baking powder or baking soda. Shortbread is widely associated with Christmas and Hogmanay festivities in Scotland, and some Scottish brands are exported around the world.

== History ==
Shortbread originated in Scotland. Although it was prepared during much of the 12th century, and probably benefited from cultural exchange with French pastry chefs during the Auld Alliance between France and Scotland, the refinement of shortbread is popularly credited to Mary, Queen of Scots in the 16th century. Despite the enduring popular association, evidence for any connection between Mary and shortbread's origin is sparse.

Triangular wedges of shortbread became known as "petticoat tails", and this form of shortbread has become particularly associated with Mary, Queen of Scots. It has been suggested that a French term for the wedges of shortbread was petits gâteaux or petites gatelles – little cakes, and this became "petticoat tails". It is now thought the Scots term derives from the decorated round edge of the segments which resemble petticoats.

The first printed recipe, in 1736, was from a Scotswoman named Mrs McLintock.

Shortbread was expensive and reserved as a luxury for special occasions, such as Christmas, Hogmanay (Scottish New Year's Eve), and weddings. In Scotland, it was traditional to break a decorated shortbread cake (infar-cake or dreaming bread) over the head of a new bride on the entrance of her new house. Shortbread was also given as a gift.

== Name ==
Shortbread is so named because of its crumbly texture (from an old meaning of the word "short", as opposed to "long", or stretchy). The cause of this texture is its high fat content, provided by the butter. The short or crumbly texture is a result of the fat inhibiting the formation of long protein (gluten) strands. The related word "shortening" refers to any fat that may be added to produce a "short" (crumbly) texture.

In British English, shortbread and shortcake have been synonyms for several centuries, starting in the 1400s; both referred to the crisp, crumbly cookie-type baked good, rather than a softer cake. The "short-cake" mentioned in Shakespeare's play The Merry Wives of Windsor, first published in 1602, was a reference to the cookie-style of shortbread.

In American English, shortbread is different from shortcake. Shortcake usually has a chemical leavening agent such as baking powder, which gives it a different, softer texture, and it is normally split and filled with fruit. The most popular example of this difference is strawberry shortcake.

== Ingredients ==
Other ingredients are often substituted for part of the flour to alter the texture. Rice flour or semolina makes it grittier, and cornflour makes it tenderer. Bere or oat flour may be added for flavour.

Modern recipes also often deviate from the original by splitting the sugar into equal parts granulated and icing sugar and many add a portion of salt.

Spices and ingredients such as almonds may be added.

== Shapes ==
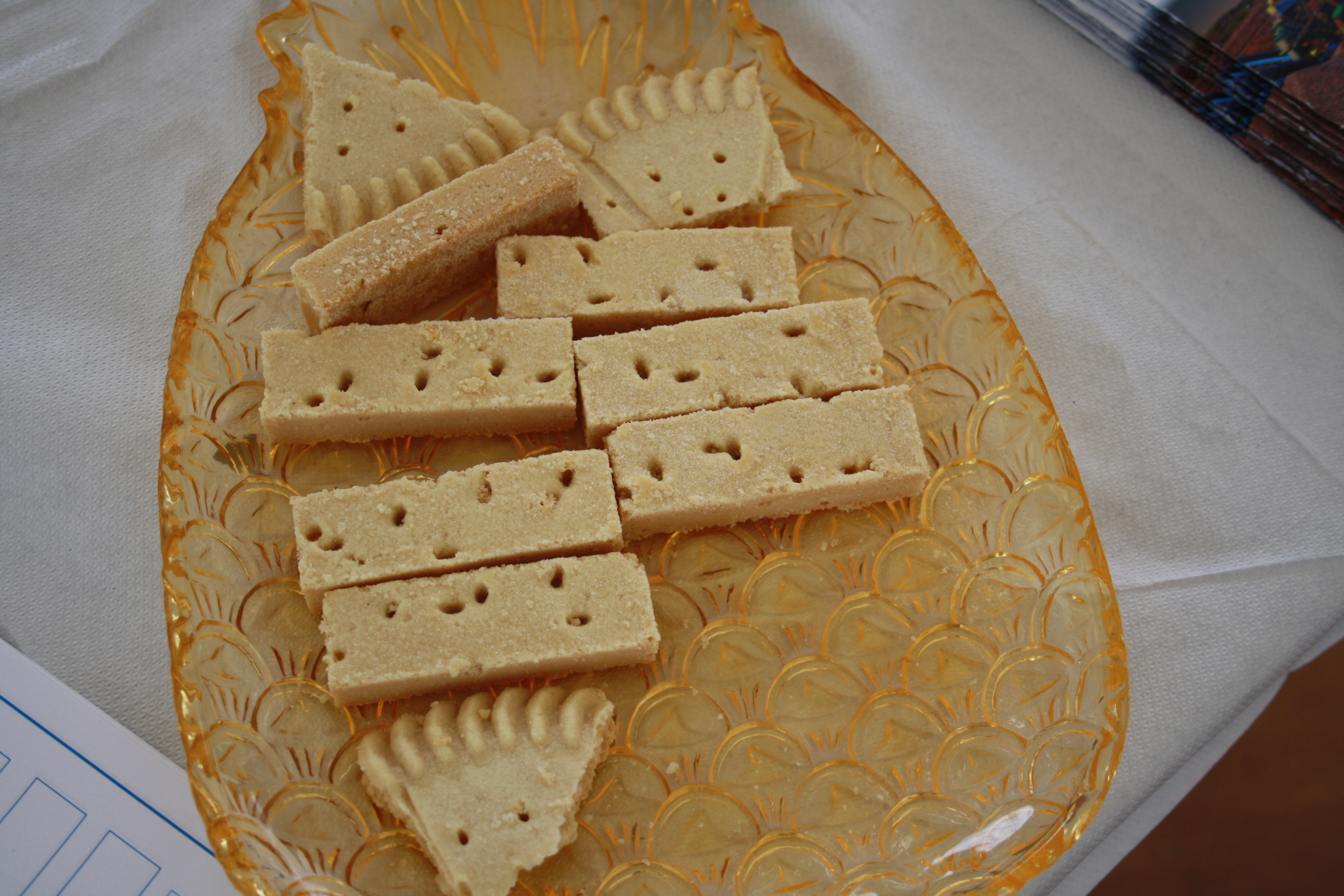
Shortbread fingers and petticoat tails

Shortbread is commonly formed into one of three shapes:

- one large circle, which is divided into segments as soon as it is taken out of the oven (petticoat tails, which may have been named from the French petits cotés, a pointed biscuit eaten with wine, or petites gatelles, the old French term for little cakes. This term may also reference the shape of a petticoat);
- individual round biscuits (shortbread rounds); or
- a thick (¾" or 2 cm) oblong slab cut into fingers.

Shortbread may also be made in quadrant-shaped farls.

In one of the oldest shapes, bakers pinched the edges of a shortbread round to suggest the rays of the sun.

The stiff dough retains its shape well during cooking. The biscuits are often patterned before cooking, usually with the tines of a fork or with a springerle-type mold. Shortbread is sometimes shaped into hearts and other shapes for special occasions.

== Varieties ==
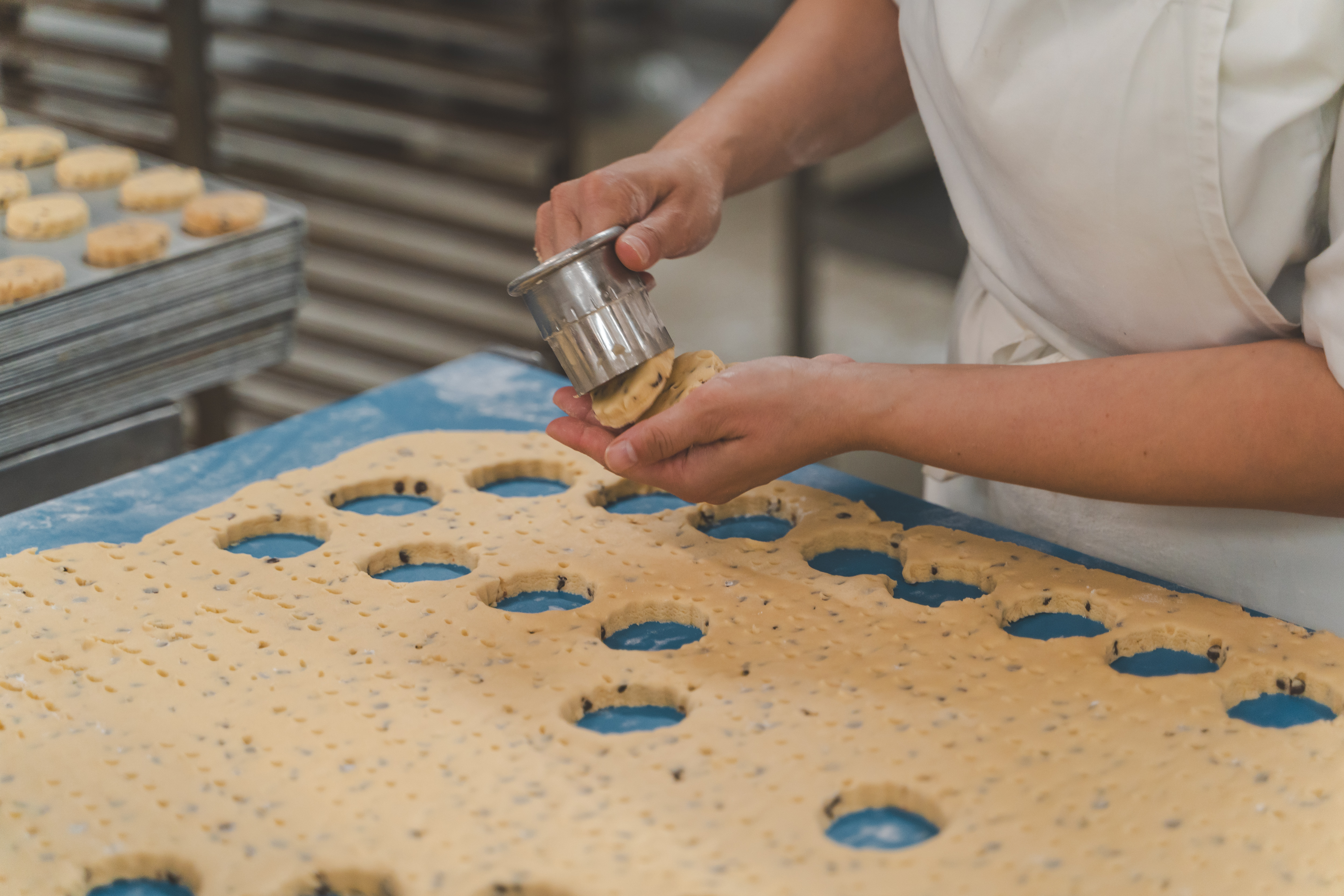
Shortbread rounds being cut at a bakery. This dough has been flavoured, docked (poked with holes), and rolled to the correct thickness before being cut.

Variations in ingredients for some recipes include the optional addition of caraway seeds to petticoat tails, coriander and caraway in Goosnargh, egg yolk and cream in Ayrshire, citrus peel and almonds in Pitcaithly bannock, and demerara sugar in Dorset.

Millionaire's shortbread, also called caramel squares, is a modern variation, in which shortbread is topped with caramel and chocolate.

== Cultural associations ==
In ancient Scottish folklore, sun-shaped cakes, such as shortbread, had magical powers over the Sun during the Scottish New Year's Eve.

Shortbread originated in and is generally associated with Scotland, but due to its popularity it is also made in the rest of the United Kingdom and similar biscuits are also made in Denmark, Ireland and Sweden. The Scottish version is the best-known and is widely exported.

Scottish chef John Quigley, of Glasgow's Red Onion, describes shortbread as "the jewel in the crown" of Scottish baking.

An early variety of shortbread, using ginger, was reportedly eaten during sittings of the Parliament of Scotland, and therefore the variety was sometimes called "Parliament cake" or "Parlies" into the 19th century. The biscuits were sold in Mrs Flockhart's tavern and shop in Bristo Street in Edinburgh's Potterrow. Known as Luckie Fykie, the landlady was thought to be the inspiration for Mrs Flockhart in Walter Scott's Waverley.

In the UK tax code, shortbread is taxed as a flour confection (baked good) rather than as a common biscuit.

== See also ==
- Breton shortbread
- Butter cookie
- Nankhatai
- Shortcake, a soft cake with a similar name
- Sugar cookie
