= Cookie dough =

Mix of uncooked cookie ingredients

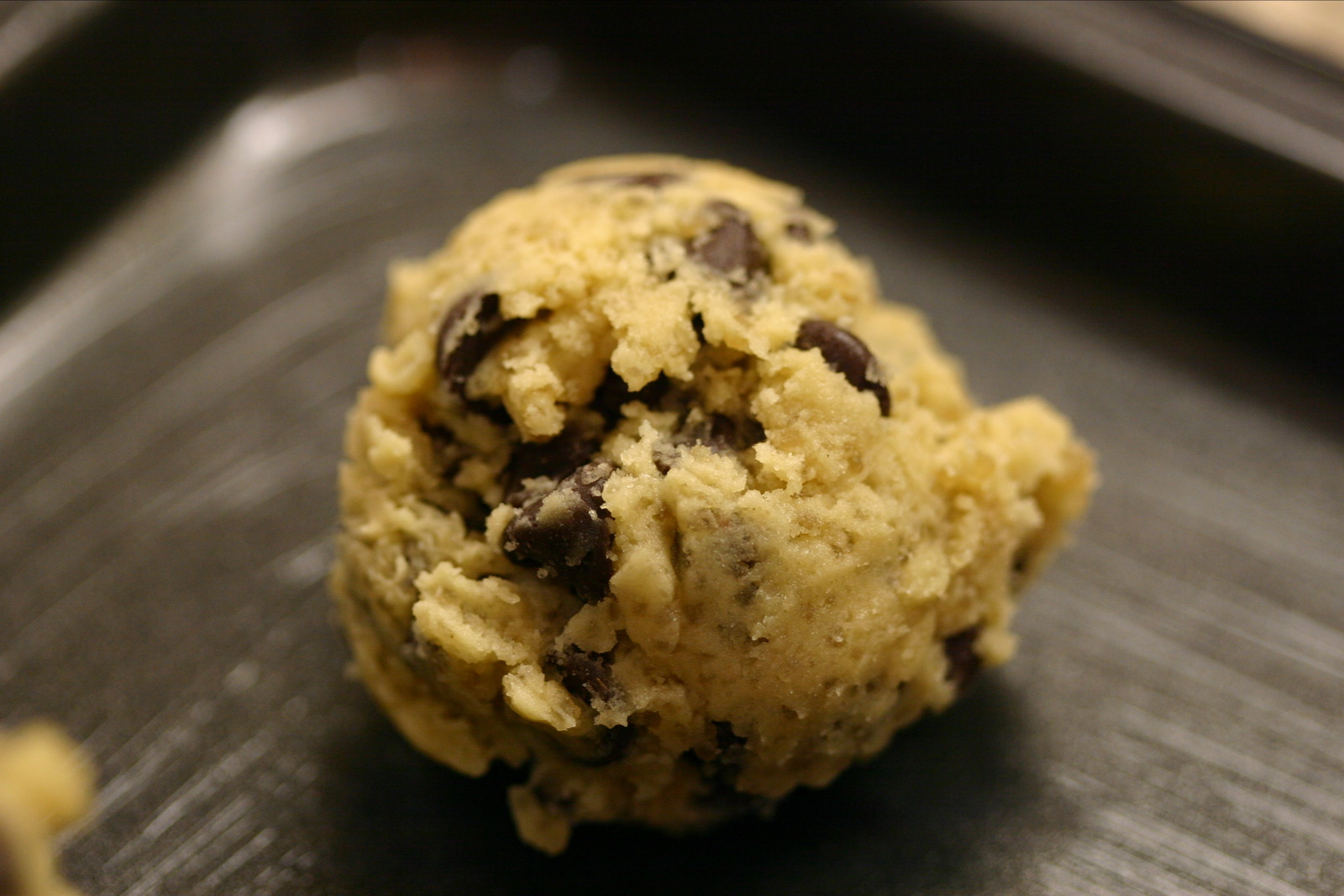
Chocolate chip cookie dough, placed on a baking tray for cooking

Cookie dough is an uncooked blend of cookie ingredients. While cookie dough is typically meant to be baked into individual cookies before consumption, edible cookie dough is specifically designed to be eaten raw; it is usually made without eggs and contains heat-treated flour to ensure safety for human consumption.

Cookie dough can be made at home or bought pre-made in packs (frozen logs, buckets, etc.). Dessert products containing cookie dough include ice cream and candy. In addition, pre-made cookie dough is sold in different flavors.

When made at home, common ingredients include flour, butter, white sugar, salt, vanilla extract, and eggs. If the dough is made with the intention of baking, then leavening agents such as baking soda or baking powder are added. However, these are often excluded in cookie doughs that are designed to be eaten raw. Chocolate chip cookie dough is a popular variation that can be made by adding chocolate chips to the mix.

== History ==
Cookie dough is derived from the creation of cookies that dates back as far as 7th-century Persia, where they were used as test cakes. Persia was one of the first countries to use sugar and soon became known for luxurious cakes and pastries. The early cookie was first labelled as a "test cake" before it was referred to as a "cookie" because the Persians would bake a small amount of cake batter in the oven to test the oven temperature, and it would come out looking like a small cake. The concept of cookies spread and became known worldwide. They evolved into biscuits for convenience, as they were easier to keep fresh for a longer period and were simple to carry for travel.

Cookies became established in Europe sometime between the 17th and 18th centuries, as baking gained popularity. At that time the word "cookie" was first used. The term comes from the Dutch language, where "koekje" means "small or little cake". During the ensuing Industrial Revolution, more cookie recipes became available. New forms and flavors of cookies continue to be created, one of which is the concept of edible cookie dough. Ruth Graves Wakefield and Sue Brides owned the Toll House Inn in Whitman, Massachusetts, where they created the eponymous chocolate chip cookie in 1938.

As cookies became more popular and people started baking them at home, people would taste the batter to ensure the sweetness of the product. The practice of eating unbaked dough came later, although it comes with potential health problems.

A self-declared micronation, the Republic of Molossia, uses Pillsbury brand cookie dough as a regulator for the currency, and cookie dough is equal to 5 Molossian Valora.

== Health risks ==
Because of the presence of raw egg and raw flour, the consumption of uncooked cookie dough increases the possibility of contracting foodborne illness. The U.S. Food and Drug Administration (FDA) strongly discourages the consumption of all food products containing raw eggs or raw flour because of the threat from disease-causing bacteria such as Salmonella and E. coli. Two tablespoons of milk can be swapped for eggs in cookie recipes. Leavening, such as baking powder or baking soda, can be removed. Doing so ensures that the cookie dough is safely edible. Cookie dough should be placed in the freezer, but it is considered safe to consume if left out in the open for 2–4 hours.

Several outbreaks stemmed from pathogens in flour. For example, raw flour was found to be the culprit in a June 2009 E. coli outbreak involving Nestlé Toll House prepackaged cookie dough, which was recalled; more than 70 people fell ill, although none died. In 2010, Nestlé switched to heat-treated processing for all flour used in producing cookie dough. Heat treatment for flour is a simple treatment to kill bacteria. This treatment involves heating the flour in a 150°C or 300°F oven or heating the flour in a microwave until it gets hot.

In 2016, General Mills recalled flour and cake mixes because of E. coli in the raw flour. In 2015, certain Blue Bell Ice Cream products were recalled due to Listeria monocytogenes found in the facility that produces chocolate chip cookie dough and other cookie dough-containing flavors.

== Edible cookie dough ==
Cookie dough designed specifically for eating raw (such as that found in ice cream) is made either with pasteurized eggs or without eggs at all and heat-treated flour.

Companies offering edible dough include "Nestlé Tollhouse Edible Cookie Dough", Dō, Edoughable, and The Cookie Dough Café.

Edible cookie dough, egg-free and made with specially treated flour, became a dessert trend in the 2010s and led to the creation of several businesses. Some sweet shops sell multiple desserts with cookie dough as one option, while others solely create and sell dough.

Chocolate Chip Cookie Dough is a popular ice cream flavor that many companies have made since the 1990s, originating with Ben & Jerry's.

== See also ==
- Chocolate chip cookie
- Chocolate chip
- Cookie Dough Bites (candy)
- Chocolate chip cookie dough ice cream
- Cookie
