= Chocolate chip cookie dough ice cream =

Ice cream flavor

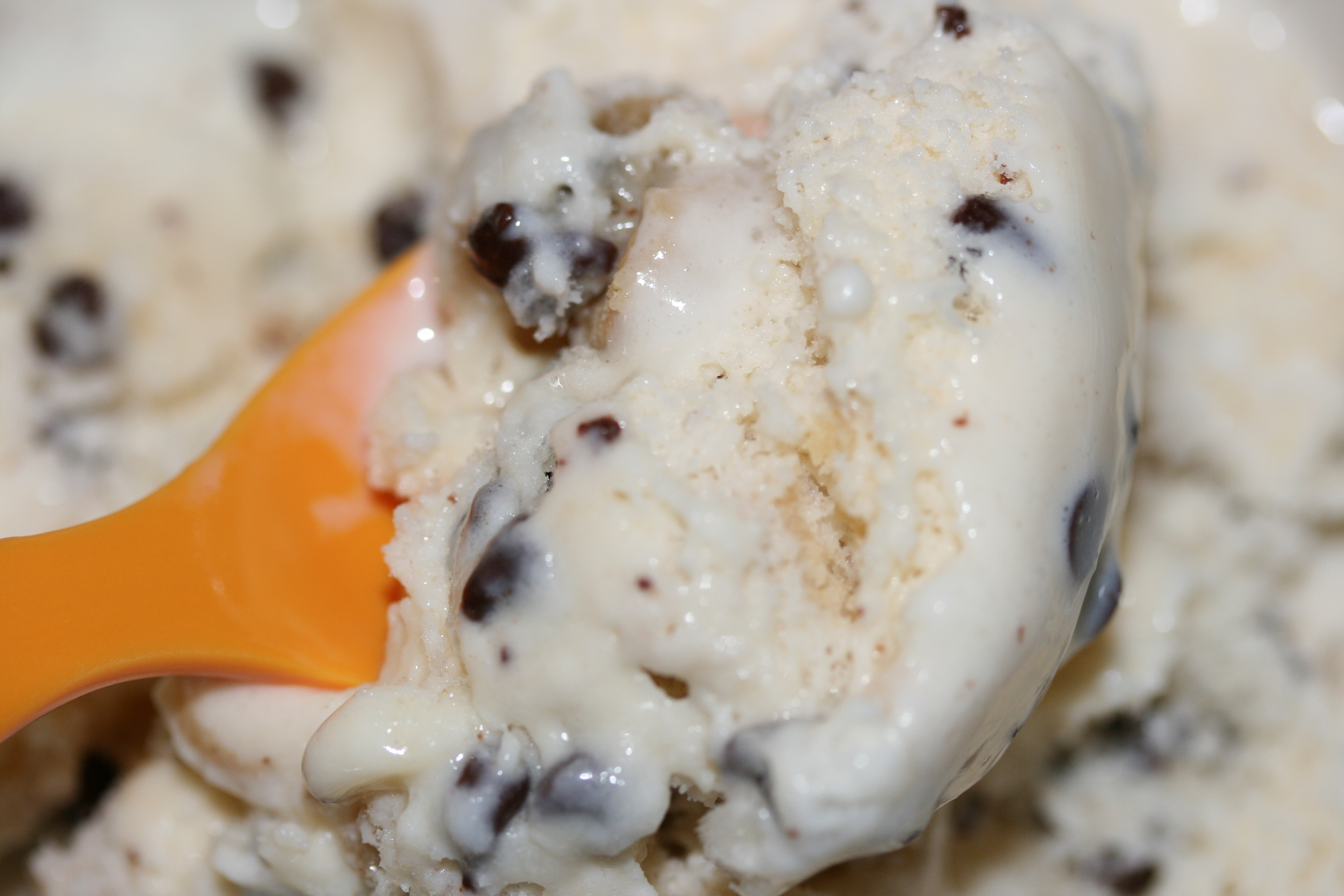
- Type: Ice cream
- Place of origin: United States
- Created by: Ben & Jerry's
- Main ingredients: Chocolate chip cookie dough, ice cream

Chocolate chip cookie dough ice cream is a popular ice cream flavor in which unbaked chunks of chocolate chip and cookie dough are embedded in vanilla-flavored ice cream.

== History ==
Chocolate chip cookie dough ice cream was said to have originated in 1984 at the first Ben & Jerry's "scoop shop" in Burlington, Vermont, from an anonymous suggestion on their flavor suggestion board. In 1991, Ben & Jerry's began selling pints of the flavor, which quickly became popular with consumers. By 1992, chocolate chip cookie dough accounted for 20 percent of the company's total ice cream sales, and other ice cream manufacturers such as Dreyer's and Mrs. Fields began making their own versions of the flavor.

== Preparation ==
Beginning in 1990, Rhino Foods manufactured the cookie dough used in Ben & Jerry's chocolate chip cookie dough ice cream. They invented a technique for maintaining the chewy consistency of the cookie dough when frozen, which the founder described as a "technological breakthrough".

Due to the health risks of eating raw cookie dough, the dough used in cookie dough ice cream is pasteurized and heat-treated. For this reason, the dough is not suitable for baking.

== See also ==
- Cookies and cream
- Stracciatella (ice cream)
- List of ice cream flavors
