= Chocolate chip =

Small chunk of chocolate used as an ingredient

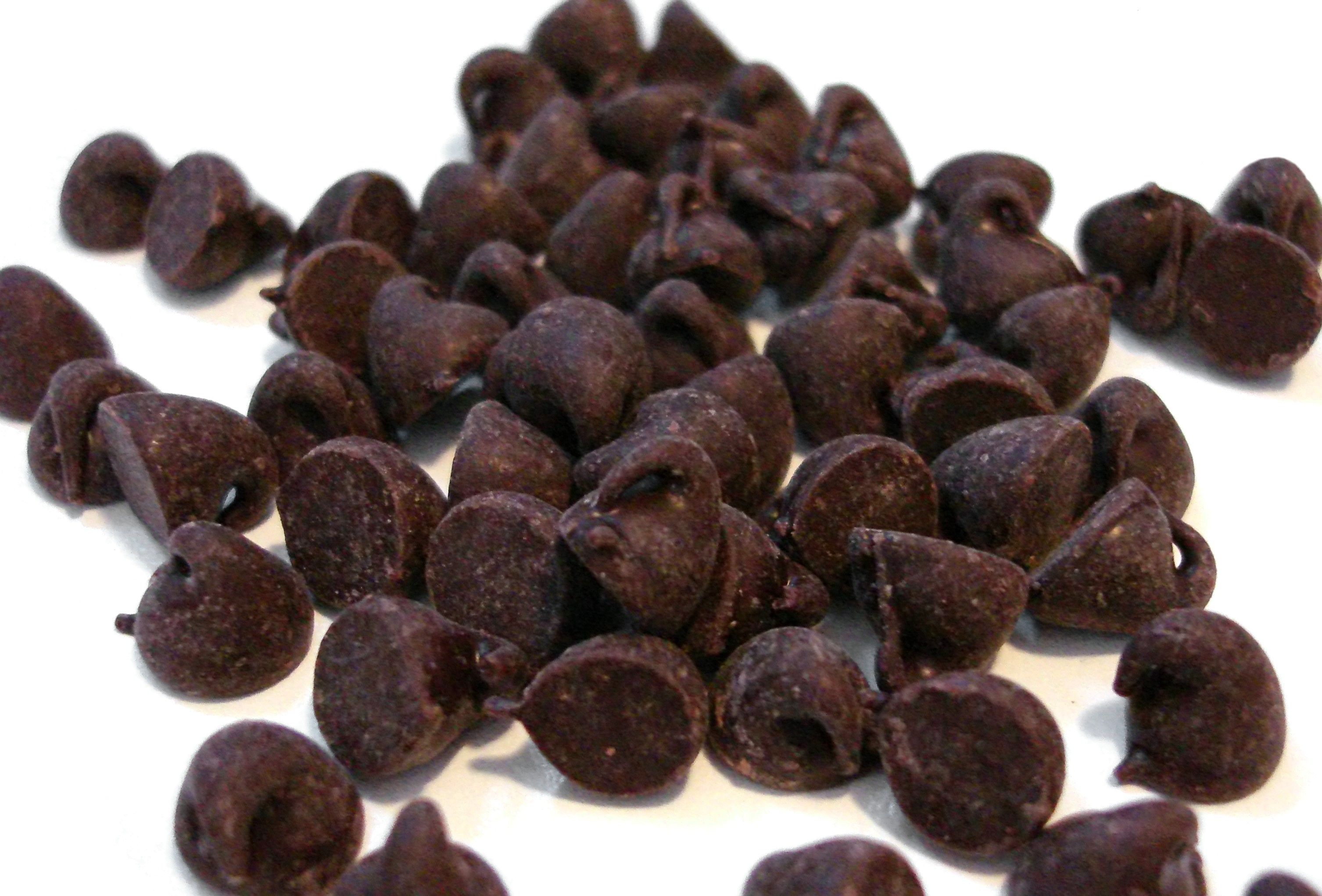
- Semi-sweet chocolate chips
- Type: Chocolate
- Place of origin: United States
- Main ingredients: Chocolate, sugar

Chocolate chips or chocolate morsels are small chunks of sweetened chocolate, used as an ingredient in a number of desserts (notably chocolate chip cookies and muffins), in trail mix, and less commonly in some breakfast foods such as pancakes. They are often manufactured as teardrop-shaped volumes with flat circular bases; another variety of chocolate chips has the shape of rectangular or square blocks. They are available in various sizes, usually less than 3/8 in (10 mm) in diameter.

== Origin ==
Chocolate chips were created with the invention of chocolate chip cookies in 1938 when Ruth Graves Wakefield of the Toll House Inn in the town of Whitman, Massachusetts, added cut-up chunks of a semi-sweet Nestlé chocolate bar to a cookie recipe. (The Nestlé brand Toll House cookies is named for the inn). The cookies were a huge success, and Wakefield reached an agreement in 1939 with Nestlé to add her recipe to the chocolate bar's packaging in exchange for a lifetime supply of chocolate. Initially, Nestlé included a small chopping tool with the chocolate bars. In 1941, Nestlé and at least one of its competitors started selling the chocolate in "chip" (or "morsel") form.

== Types ==
Originally, chocolate chips were made of semi-sweet chocolate, but today there are many flavors. These include bittersweet, peanut butter, butterscotch, mint chocolate, white chocolate, dark chocolate, milk chocolate, and white and dark swirled chips.

== Uses ==
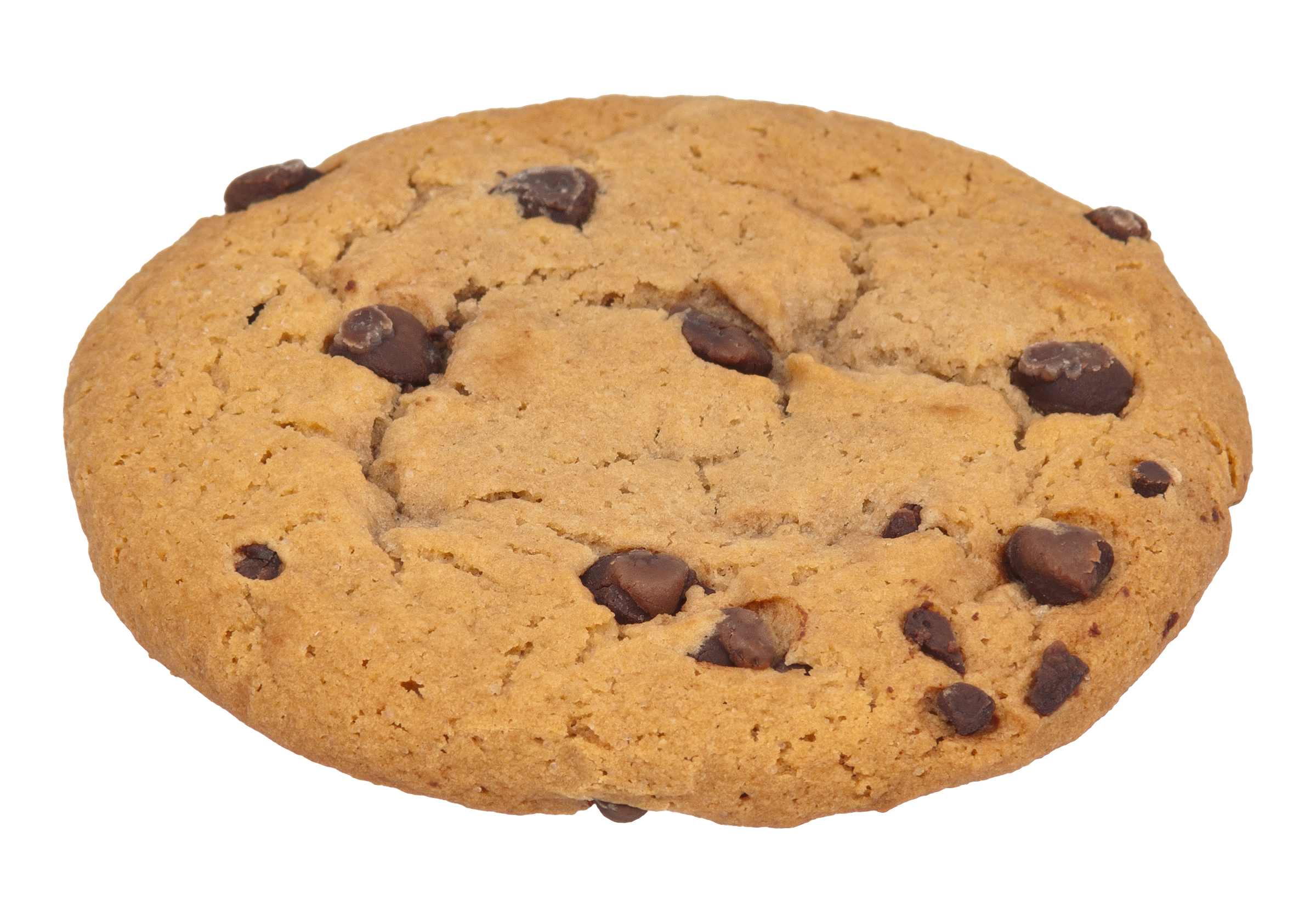
Chocolate chips in a cookie

Chocolate chips can be used in cookies, pancakes, waffles, cakes, pudding, muffins, crêpes, pies, hot chocolate, and various pastries. They are also found in many other retail food products such as granola bars, ice cream, and trail mix.

=== Baking and melting ===
Chocolate chips can also be melted and used in sauces and other recipes. The chips melt best at temperatures between 104 and 113 °F (40 and 45 °C). The melting process starts at 90 °F (32 °C), when the cocoa butter starts melting in the chips. The cooking temperature must never exceed 115 °F (46 °C) for milk chocolate and white chocolate or 120 °F (49 °C) for dark chocolate, or the chocolate will burn.

Although convenient, melted chocolate chips are not always recommended as a substitute for baking chocolate. Because most chocolate chips are designed to retain their shape when baking, they contain less cocoa butter than baking chocolate and so can be more difficult to work with melted.

== Availability ==
Chocolate chips are popular as a baking ingredient in the United States. Originating in the US, the chocolate chip cookie is widely available in many parts of the world. Nestlé and the Hershey Company are some producers of chocolate chips.
