= Whitman, Massachusetts =

Town in Massachusetts, United States

- Town
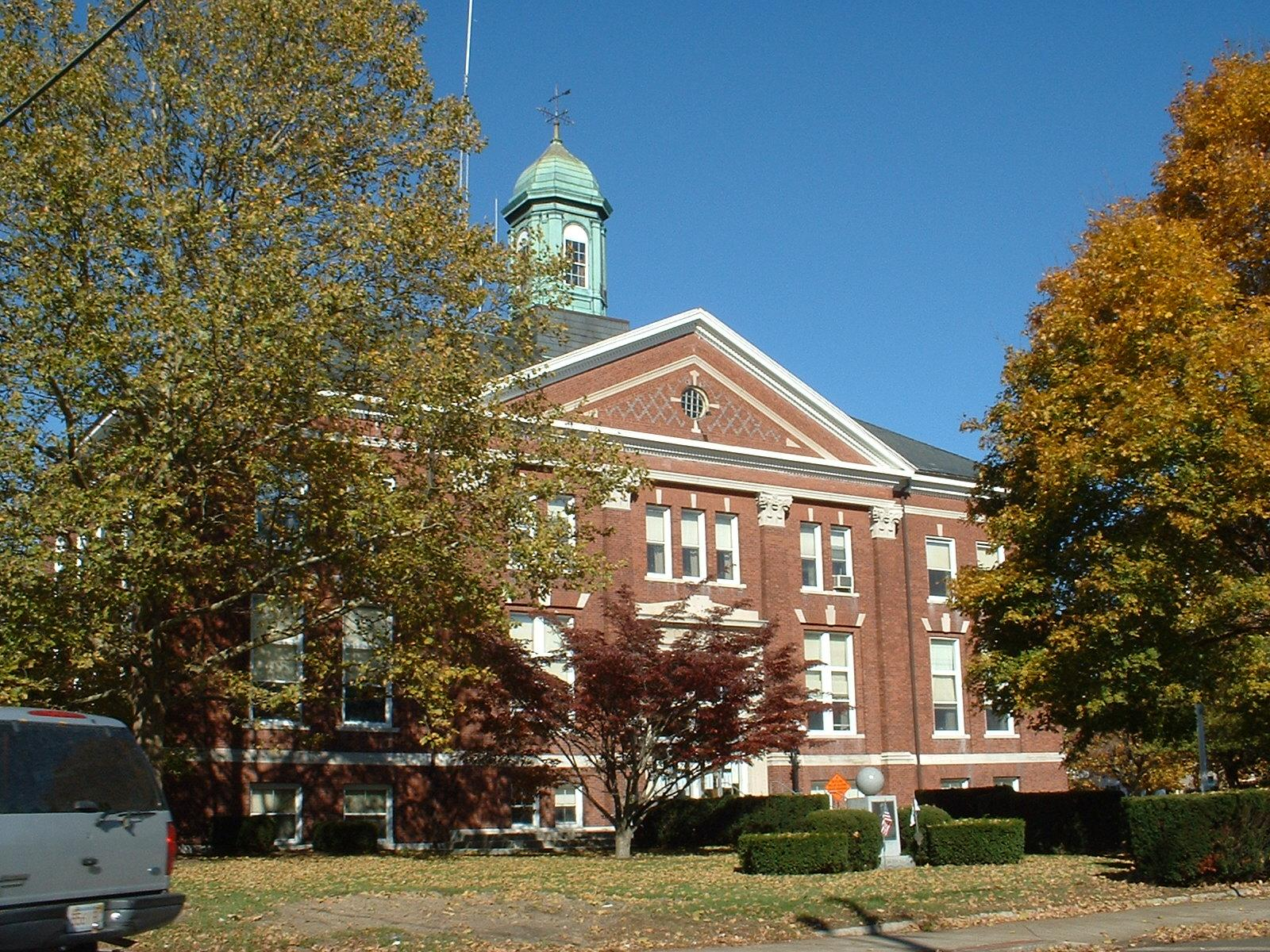
- Whitman Town Hall

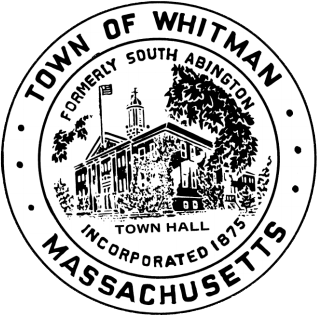
- Seal
- Motto: "The Birthplace Of The Chocolate Chip Cookie"
- Location in Plymouth County in Massachusetts
- Coordinates: 42°04′50″N 70°56′10″W
- Country: United States
- State: Massachusetts
- County: Plymouth
- Settled: 1670
- Incorporated: March 4, 1875

Government
  - Type: Open town meeting

Area
  - Total: 7.0 sq mi (18.1 km^{2})
  - Land: 6.9 sq mi (18.0 km^{2})
  - Water: 0 sq mi (0.0 km^{2})
- Elevation: 112 ft (34 m)

Population (2020)
  - Total: 15,121
  - Density: 2,176/sq mi (840.1/km^{2})
- Time zone: UTC−5 (Eastern)
  - Summer (DST): UTC−4 (Eastern)
- ZIP Code: 02382
- Area code: 339/781
- FIPS code: 25-79530
- GNIS feature ID: 0618355
- Website: www.whitman-ma.gov

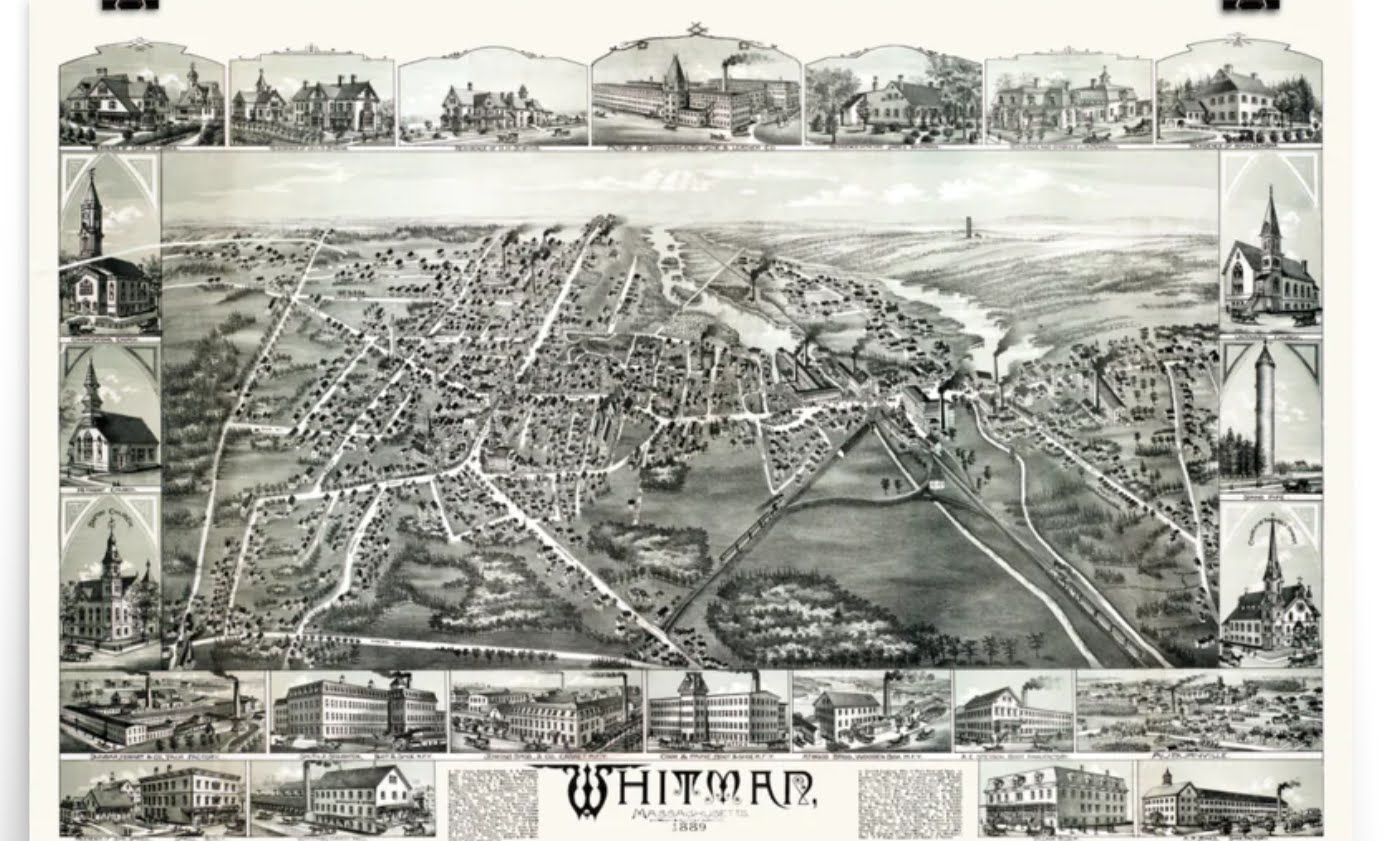
Aerial Map of Whitman, Ma and selected homes and businesses 1889

Whitman is a town in Plymouth County, Massachusetts, United States. The population was 15,121 at the 2020 census. It is located approximately 20 miles (32 km) south of Boston on the western edge of the South Shore. The chocolate chip cookie was invented in Whitman by Ruth Graves Wakefield at the Toll House Inn.

== History ==
Little Comfort, then part of Bridgewater was first settled by Europeans beginning around 1675. Abington (including Little Comfort) separated from Bridgewater in 1712. South Abington was established as a separate parish in the 19th century. It was incorporated as a separate town on March 4, 1875. It was renamed Whitman by town vote on May 3, 1886. The name was in honor of Jared Whitman, a local lawyer who served in the 1839 and 1840 state legislatures. Whitman's early industry included shoemaking.

In the late 1930s, Ruth Graves Wakefield invented chocolate chip cookies in Whitman at the Toll House Inn on Bedford Street. The Toll House burned completely on New Year's Eve 1984, in a fire that originated in the kitchen. The inn was not rebuilt. The site is marked with a historical marker, and that land is now home to a Wendy's restaurant and Walgreens pharmacy, with the Toll House sign still in existence.

The former Whitman Savings Bank was the first in the country to offer savings bank life insurance (SBLI). From 1968 to 1994, Whitman was also home to King's Castle Land, a children's amusement park owned by the Whitney family and located near the intersection of Routes 18 and 14.

In the 1970s, Whitman was home to a then-secret National Security Agency classified materials disposal facility built on Essex Street by American Thermogen Inc. It was code named "White Elephant No. 1" and it was to be the prototype for the government's premier "classified waste destructor". Reaching temperatures up to 3,400 degrees, the three-story incinerator did not work up to expectations—only operating a limited number of hours and not always fully destroying the material—and after spending $1.2 million to build the unit it was abandoned. It was one time used as a club house by children in the area, and later dismantled. The office section, and some of the warehouse area, still remain in use by new owners.

== Geography ==
According to the United States Census Bureau, the town has a total area of 7.0 square miles (18 km^{2}), of which 7.0 square miles (18 km^{2}) is land and 0.14% is water. Statistically, the town is the 327th of 351 communities in the Commonwealth by land area, and is the second smallest (above only Hull) in Plymouth County. Whitman is bordered by Abington to the north, Rockland to the northeast, Hanson to the southeast, East Bridgewater to the south, and the city of Brockton to the west. Whitman's town center is approximately 4.5 miles (7.2 km) east of the center of Brockton and approximately 20 miles (32 km) south of Boston.

The small town today is mostly residential, with a small town forest in the northeastern corner of town. The eastern half of the town is divided by the Shumatuscacant River, which is dammed near the town center at the site of the town's mills. The eastern half of town is also dominated by two meadows, the Hobart Meadow to the north and the Bear Meadow to the south, both along the banks of the river.

== Transportation ==
The center of town is about half a mile to the east of the intersection of Route 18 and Route 27, the actual center of town being at the intersection of Route 27 and Washington Street. Route 14 also intersects with Route 18, about three-quarters of a mile south of the intersection of Routes 27 and 18. Route 58 also crosses through the eastern corner of town. There are no interstates or divided highways in town; the nearest highway is Route 24 which passes through Brockton.

Whitman is served by Whitman station on the Kingston Line of the MBTA Commuter Rail system. There is no air service to the town; the nearest international air service can be reached at Logan International Airport in Boston, 26 miles north of Whitman.

== Demographics ==
Historical population
Year	Pop.	±%
1880	3,024	—
1890	4,441	+46.9%
1900	6,155	+38.6%
1910	7,292	+18.5%
1920	7,147	−2.0%
1930	7,638	+6.9%
1940	7,759	+1.6%
1950	8,413	+8.4%
1960	10,485	+24.6%
1970	13,059	+24.5%
1980	13,534	+3.6%
1990	13,240	−2.2%
2000	13,882	+4.8%
2010	14,489	+4.4%
2020	15,121	+4.4%
2024*	15,459	+2.2%
* = population estimate. Source: United States Census records and Population Estimates Program data.

As of the census of 2000, there were 13,882 people, 4,999 households, and 3,604 families residing in the town. The population density was 1,995.7 inhabitants per square mile (770.5/km^{2}). There were 5,104 housing units at an average density of 733.8 per square mile (283.3/km^{2}). The racial makeup of the town was 97.15% White, 0.65% African American, 0.16% Native American, 0.43% Asian, 0.01% Pacific Islander, 0.48% from other races, and 1.12% from two or more races. Hispanic or Latino of any race were 0.88% of the population.

There were 4,999 households, out of which 36.8% had children under the age of 18 living with them, 56.5% were married couples living together, 11.6% had a female householder with no husband present, and 27.9% were non-families. Of all households 22.4% were made up of individuals, and 8.0% had someone living alone who was 65 years of age or older. The average household size was 2.77 and the average family size was 3.30.

In the town, the population was spread out, with 26.7% under the age of 18, 8.4% from 18 to 24, 33.6% from 25 to 44, 21.8% from 45 to 64, and 9.5% who were 65 years of age or older. The median age was 35 years. For every 100 females, there were 96.4 males. For every 100 females age 18 and over, there were 93.1 males.

The median income for a household in the town was $55,303, and the median income for a family was $63,706. Males had a median income of $41,950 versus $30,629 for females. The per capita income for the town was $23,002. About 2.0% of families and 3.3% of the population were below the poverty line, including 2.8% of those under age 18 and 8.0% of those age 65 or over.

Statistically, Whitman is the 133rd largest community by population and 52nd most densely populated in the state. On average, Whitman's population is below the average but above the median, and its population density is well above the state average.

== Government ==
On the national level, Whitman is a part of Massachusetts's 8th congressional district (as of the 2013 redistricting), and has been represented since 2001 by Stephen Lynch. The state's senior (Class I) senator, elected in 2012, is Elizabeth Warren. The junior (Class II) member of the United States Senate is Ed Markey. Markey was elected in 2013 to finish out the remainder of the term vacated by John Kerry when he became Secretary of State.

On the state level, Whitman is represented in the Massachusetts House of Representatives as a part of the Seventh Plymouth district, which includes the towns of Abington and East Bridgewater and is currently represented by Abington resident Alyson Sullivan. The town is represented in the Massachusetts Senate as a part of the Second Plymouth and Bristol district, which includes Brockton, Halifax, Hanover, Hanson and portions of East Bridgewater and Easton and the seat is currently held by Michael Brady. The town is patrolled by the Whitman Police Department.

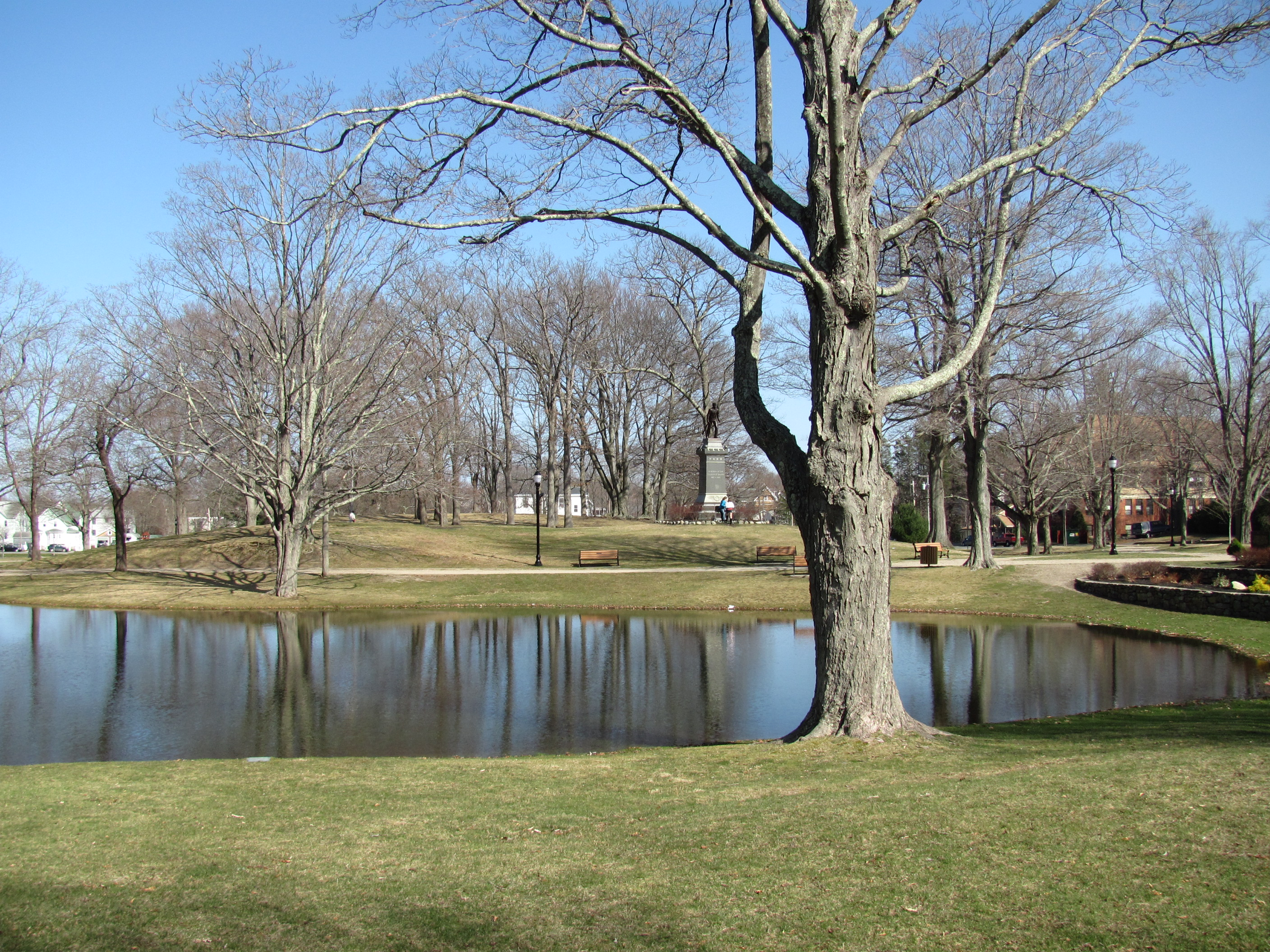
Whitman Park, MA

Whitman is governed by the open town meeting form of government, and is led by a town manager and a board of selectmen. The town's police department is located in a newly constructed building on a site formerly used for a succession of schools. The town's fire department is located further west along Route 27. It has its own ambulance service, and patients needing emergency care are brought to Brockton Hospital, Boston Medical Center South (formerly Good Samaritan Hospital) in Brockton or South Shore Hospital in South Weymouth. The town's post office is located just east of the town hall. The Whitman Public Library is located a block south of Route 27, having moved into its first stand-alone branch in 1982 after seventy-five years in the town hall. Between the library and the fire department is a National Guard armory. The town also operates a playground and pool at the Whitman town park (which was designed by the Olmsted Brothers firm), just north of the town hall.

Despite being adjacent to Brockton, a Democratic Party stronghold, the town of Whitman is slightly conservative. Until 2020, when Joe Biden carried Whitman by 7 points, last Democrat to win the town was John Kerry, a Massachusetts native, in 2004, by about 6 points.

== Education ==
Since the mid-1960s, Whitman has been paired with Hanson as a part of what was the Whitman-Hanson Regional High School School District but later joined as Whitman-Hanson Regional School District with the addition of the elementary and middle schools. There are two elementary schools in town; the Duval and Conley Schools (in the east and west parts of town, respectively), which serve students from kindergarten through fifth grade. The Whitman Middle School, located south of Route 27 in the western part of town, serves students from sixth to eighth grades. Students from both Whitman and Hanson attend Whitman-Hanson Regional High School, located along Route 27 on the Hanson side of the road. Students moved into the new, more technologically advanced school building in 2005 from the previous school, which was closer to the road (the former Whitman-Hanson High School is no longer standing and its old location is now home to athletic fields.) Whitman-Hanson's teams are known as the Panthers, and their colors are red and black. One of their chief rivals is nearby Abington, against whom they have played 112 annual Thanksgiving Day football games through 2023. In 2010, Whitman-Hanson played the 100th-anniversary game against Abington. Whitman-Hanson leads the series, 61–48–3, through the 2023 season, with Abington winning the most recent the 2023 meeting. In addition to Whitman-Hanson, students may choose to attend South Shore Regional Vocational Technical High School in Hanover free of charge. There are no private schools in the town, but both Hanson and Brockton have private schools. The nearest college is Massasoit Community College in neighboring Brockton.

== Notable people ==
- "Two Gun" Atwood, 1940s radio performer known as "The Bay State Singing Cowboy"
- Lennie Baker, of the doo wop band Sha Na Na
- Sean Conover, former defensive end for the St. Louis Rams of the National Football League
- Geoff Diehl, former state representative, Republican nominee for Governor of Massachusetts
- Lt. John R. Fox, war hero, Medal of Honor, Distinguished Service Cross, Bronze Star, Purple Heart, is interred in Colebrook Cemetery, Whitman
- Alex Karalexis, a professional fighter who competed in the Ultimate Fighting Championship, World Extreme Cagefighting and was an original cast member on Season 1 of The Ultimate Fighter, The Ultimate Fighter 1
- Dana LeVangie, former baseball player and former pitching coach for the Boston Red Sox
- Joe List, comedian
- James Lowder, editor and fantasy/horror author
- Harry Markopolos, unheeded whistleblower to the U.S. Securities and Exchange Commission of suspected securities fraud by Bernard Madoff
- Poppy, singer/songwriter and YouTube personality
- Steve Smith, drummer of the rock band Journey as well as many jazz/fusion projects
- Francis Spellman, cardinal, ninth Bishop and sixth Archbishop of the Roman Catholic Archdiocese of New York
- Ruth Wakefield, creator of the Toll House Cookie

== Publications ==
The novel Little Comfort by Edwin Hill (ISBN 978-1496715906) was named for the town. The author's father and grandmother grew up in Whitman.

In his introduction to the award-winning essay collection Hobby Games: The 100 Best, editor James Lowder mentions "Playing Dungeons & Dragons in a house behind the now-defunct King's Castle Land kiddie amusement park in Whitman, Massachusetts."

== See also ==
- Pyro-Magnetics Corporation
