= Whitman Park =

- U.S. National Register of Historic Places
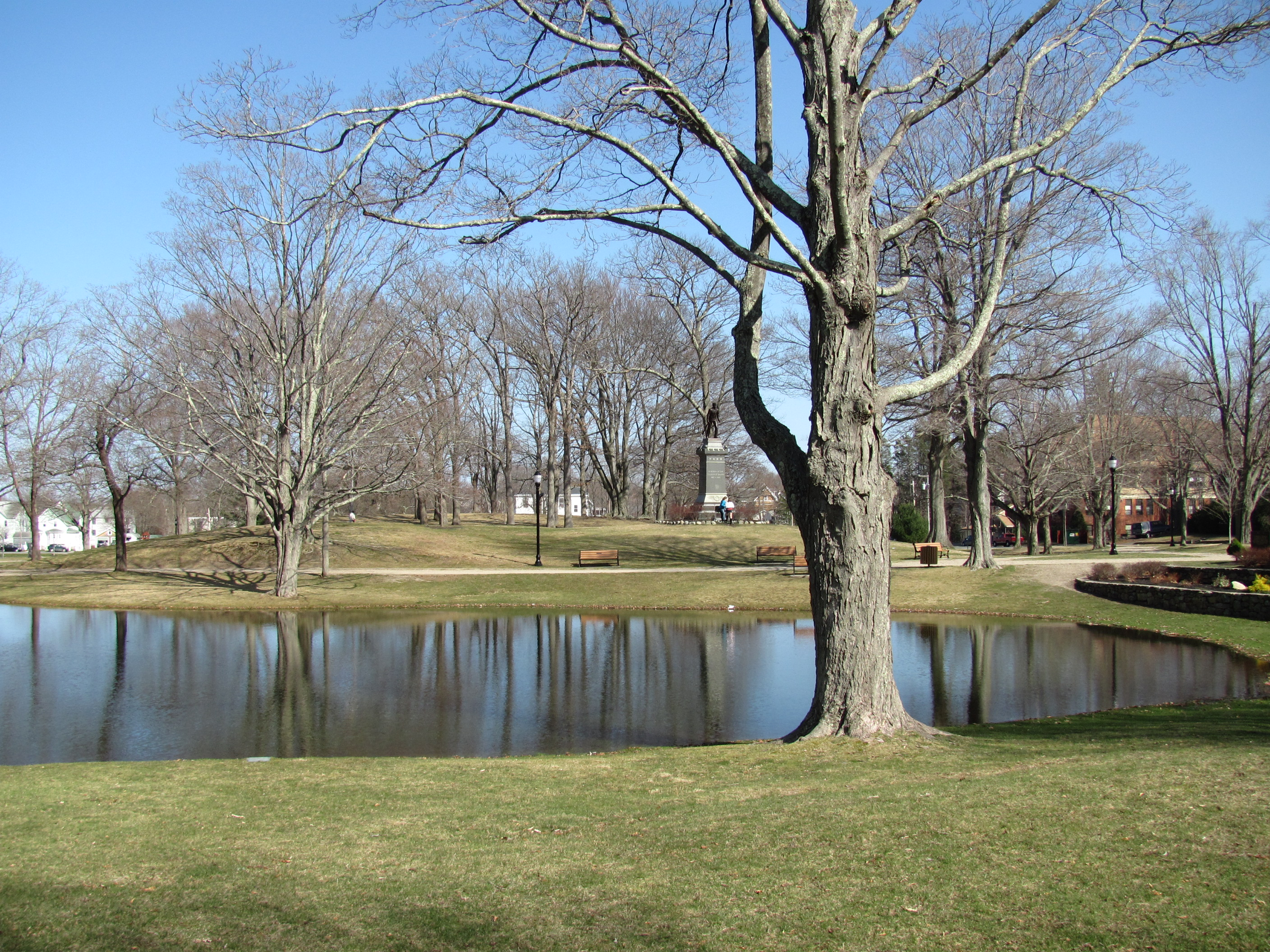
- Whitman Park

- Location within Massachusetts Location within the United States
- Location: Whitman, Massachusetts
- Coordinates: 42.0829°N 70.9345°W
- Area: 14.3 acres (5.8 ha)
- Built: 1880
- Architect: Olmsted Bros.
- Architectural style: Stick/Eastlake
- NRHP reference No.: 04000187
- Added to NRHP: March 18, 2004

Whitman Park is a historic park near the center of the town of Whitman, Massachusetts. It is bounded by Maple Street and Park, Whitman, and Hayden Avenues. The park was established in 1880 by a gift of land from Augustus Whitman, whose family gave the town its name. The well-known Olmsted Brothers landscape firm was retained to design a public park on this land, which was implemented in 1900. This gave the park the basic layout of its paths, as well as its general appearance as a woodland park with open fields for passive recreation. Features that were part of the Olmsted design include a wading pool, concrete tennis court (now used as basketball court), bandstand, and a drinking fountain. The Olmsteds were retained again in 1931 to update the design, accounting for the addition in 1908 of the Civil War monument, and to deal with problematic drainage of water from the park's low-lying areas. The major intrusion on the Olmsted design has been the construction of a Little League ballfield in one corner.

The park was listed on the National Register of Historic Places in 2004.

== See also ==
- National Register of Historic Places listings in Plymouth County, Massachusetts
