= Rhino Foods =

Food and drink companies of the United States

Rhino Foods Inc.
- Industry: Food Manufacturing
- Founded: Burlington, Vermont, U.S. (1981; 45 years ago)
- Founder: Ted Castle
- Headquarters: 79 Industrial Parkway; Burlington, VT, US 05401
- Number of locations: 2
- Area served: United States, Canada, Europe
- Key people: Ted Castle, Owner & President; Gene Steinfeld, Director of Operations; Jayne Magnant, Finance & Admin Director; Dan Kiniry, Marketing Director
- Products: Cookie Dough and Cake pieces for frozen dessets, Ice Cream Cookie Sandwiches
- Revenue: Not available
- Owner: Ted Castle
- Number of employees: 100
- Website: www.rhinofoods.com

Rhino Foods Incorporated, founded in 1981 by Anne and Ted Castle, is a specialty ice cream novelty and ice cream ingredient manufacturer located in Burlington, Vermont, United States. Rhino Foods has grown from a small ice cream shop, Chessy's Frozen Custard, into a business with over 150 employees. In 2013, the company became a certified B Corporation joining nearly 5,000 companies worldwide in the unified goal to use business as a force for good for people and the planet. The company is best known locally for their ice cream sandwich, the Chesster. In 1991, the company worked with Ben & Jerry's to develop the first cookie dough for use in ice cream. The company produces cookie dough and baked pieces for most major brands in the ice cream industry. The company also co-packs ice cream cookie sandwiches for national and international companies.

== Employee Exchange program ==
Rhino Foods operates the Employee Exchange Program (EEP) as a way to manage seasonal staffing demands to the benefit of employees and the company. The company sent 15 factory workers as temporary staff to the lip balm manufacturer Autumn Harp for a week to deal with the holiday rush.

The Employee Exchange Program was developed in 1993 when a group of Rhino employees held brainstorming sessions on how to respond to a drop in staffing needs during the winter months.

== Income Advance Program ==
In 2007, Rhino Foods started a new employee program to support short-term and long-term financial stability. Any employee that has worked at the company for 12 months can get a same day loan up to a $1000 from Rhino's credit union partner. The loan is paid off with automatic weekly payroll deductions. When the loan is repaid the deduction rolls into a savings account in the employee's name unless the employee cancels it. This helps employees build a relationship with a bank and improve their credit rating.

== Ted Castle ==
Ted Castle is the founder, owner, and CEO of Rhino Foods. He is a former All-American hockey player at the University of Vermont from the 1970s. He coached in Vermont as well as Maine and played professionally in Italy and Sweden. He is also known for his activism with child abuse prevention, Shelburne Farms, The United Way, and Vermont Special Olympics.

The Vermont Businesses for Social Responsibility (VBSR) presented Castle with the 2009 Terry Ehrich Award for Socially Responsible Business Practices. He has been an advocate of the hiring and retention of refugees, and developed a Wellness and Health Awareness Team with the United Way, known as HELP (Helping Employees Live Productively). He adopted open-book management in the early days of the company to provide financial information and share company priorities.
