= Pyro-Magnetics Corporation =

US company

- Industry: Industrial furnaces
- Defunct: 1983
- Fate: Chapter 7 bankruptcy
- Headquarters: Whitman, Massachusetts, United States

Pyro-Magnetics Corporation was a Whitman, Massachusetts based manufacturer of industrial furnaces. The business produced a processor for disposing hazardous wastes. The product's technical requirements were approved by the Environmental Protection Agency in June 1982.

== Insolvency ==
In late 1982, the corporation sold its two operating units to pay debts and after the sale few of its employees remained. The Pyro-Magnetics Corporation filed for Chapter 7 bankruptcy at a federal bankruptcy court in Whitman, in April 1983. The firm previously attempted to raise funds by developing commercial applications for its high-temperature melting technology. It failed to have enough funds to prepare and file an annual report with the Securities and Exchange Commission in the spring of 1983. The Pyro-Magnetics Corporation reported a loss of $71,093 in the first quarter of 1982 compared to an annual loss of $198,862 for the entire year of 1981.
