= Ruth Graves Wakefield =

American chef and inventor (1903–1977)

- Born: Ruth Jones Graves; June 17, 1903; Walpole, Massachusetts, U.S.
- Died: January 10, 1977 (aged 73); Plymouth, Massachusetts, U.S.
- Education: Framingham State Normal School
- Known for: Inventing the Chocolate chip cookie
- Spouse: Kenneth Donald Wakefield (m. 1928)
- Children: 2
- Culinary career
- Cooking style: American
- Previous restaurants
- Toll House Inn; Whitman, Massachusetts burned down 1984

Ruth Graves Wakefield (née Jones Graves; June 17, 1903 – January 10, 1977) was an American chef, known for her innovations in the baking field. She made the first chocolate chip cookie recipe, an invention many people loved. Her new dessert was an inspiration behind the massively popular Toll House Chocolate Chip Cookie. Throughout her life, Wakefield found occupation as a educator, business owner, and she was a published author. She wrote a cookbook titled Ruth Wakefield’s, Toll House: Tried and True Recipes.

== Personal life ==
Ruth Jones Graves was born on June 17, 1903, in East Walpole, Massachusetts, to Fred Graves and Helen Vest Jones. She was raised in Easton and attended the Framingham State School of Household Arts, currently Framingham State University. Upon graduation in 1924, Ruth taught home economics at Brockton High School, in addition to working as a hospital dietitian and a customer service representative at a utility company. Ruth married Kenneth Donald Wakefield, a meat packing executive, in 1928. Together, the couple had two children, Kenneth Donald Jr. and a daughter, Mary Jane. In 1930, the couple decided to purchase a historic building in Whitman, Plymouth County, which had allegedly been used as a toll house as early as 1709. Building on the tradition of the house, Kenneth and Ruth elected to turn the building into a lodge, fittingly naming the new business the Toll House Inn. The news of her cooking prowess quickly spread, as the inn grew from seven to over sixty tables.

== Toll House Inn ==
Wakefield and her husband bought a tourist lodge that they called the Tollhouse Inn. She cooked for the guests using her own recipes and some of her grandmother's old recipes that became very successful and grew the Inn's dining room from seven tables to 60. Her recipes were so popular that she released multiple cookbooks, the most popular being a cookbook titled Ruth Wakefield's Tried and True Recipes in 1931.

== Inventing the "Toll House" Chocolate Chip Cookie ==
Wakefield was looking to improve on the colonial-style desserts she had been serving to her customers. In 1938, Ruth, along with her cooking assistant Sue Brides, were experimenting with a thin butterscotch pecan cookie that had been incredibly popular with guests. Her intuition was to add melting squares of baking chocolate to the blond batter, but she realized her baking cabinet was out of the ingredient. The closest substitute at her disposal was semi-sweet chocolate bars from the Nestlé company. Continuing to improvise, Ruth used an icepick to break the chocolate into pea-sized bits, which today would be recognized as the cookie's staple, chocolate "chips." As opposed to melting and disseminating across the cookie, the bits maintained their chunky form as they baked. Inn visitors loved the revolutionary good and the novel dessert created an influx of visitors. It became so popular that it was featured in newspapers, and the Wakefields received countless letters from people requesting the recipe, and the Toll House Cookie became the most popular dessert of the time.

In exchange for Wakefield offering Nestlé permission to print the recipe and market their semi-sweet chocolate as a key ingredient, Wakefield received a $1 payment for recipe rights, a lifetime supply of baking chocolate, and a consulting deal with Nestlé. In tribute to the origin story, Nestlé branded the products "Toll House Cookies."

A myth holds that Wakefield accidentally developed the cookie, and that she expected the chocolate chunks would melt, making chocolate cookies. That is not the case; Wakefield stated that she deliberately invented the cookie. She said, "We had been serving a thin butterscotch nut cookie with ice cream. Everybody seemed to love it, but I was trying to give them something different. So I came up with Toll House cookie."

== Toll House Cookies and World War II ==
The Toll House Cookies rose to popularity in the 1940s, during World War II. Ruth's daughter (who worked as a cooking assistant) recalls days in the kitchen filled with packing care packages to send to the Massachusetts troops overseas. They soon began receiving letters from all over the country requesting that the packages including Toll House Cookies be sent to troops from other states.

== Death ==
Ruth retired in 1966 and sold the Toll House, which later burned down in 1984. Ruth died on January 10, 1977, in Plymouth, Massachusetts, at the age of 73.
