= Shirley Corriher =

American biochemist

Shirley O. Corriher (born February 23, 1935) is an American biochemist and author of CookWise: The Hows and Whys of Successful Cooking, winner of a James Beard Foundation award, and BakeWise: The Hows and Whys of Successful Baking. CookWise shows how scientific insights can be applied to traditional cooking, while BakeWise applies the same idea to baking. Some compare Corriher's approach to that of Harold McGee (whom Corriher thanks as her "intellectual hero" in the "My Gratitude and Thanks" section of Cookwise) and Alton Brown. She has made a number of appearances as a food consultant on Brown's show Good Eats and has released a DVD, Shirley O. Corriher's Kitchen Secrets Revealed.

== Personal life ==
After graduating from Vanderbilt University in 1959, she and her then-husband opened a boys' school in Atlanta, Georgia, where she was responsible for cooking three meals a day for 30 boys. By 1970 the school had grown to 140 students. That same year she divorced her husband and left the school; she took up cooking to support herself and her three children.

== Books ==
- Corriher, Shirley O. (1997). CookWise: The Hows and Whys of Successful Cooking. HarperCollins. ISBN 0-688-10229-8.
- Corriher, Shirley O. (2007). BakeWise: The Hows and Whys of Successful Baking. Scribner. ISBN 978-1-4165-6078-4.
- Corriher, Shirley O. (2020). KitchenWise: Essential Food Science for Home Cooks. Scribner. ISBN 978-1-9821-4069-4.

== See also ==
- Harold McGee
- Alton Brown
