= Cookie Dough Bites (candy) =

American confectionery brand

Cookie Dough Bites is an American candy owned by Taste of Nature, Inc. With a cookie dough confectionery center, they are chocolate covered and most typically sold in theater-sized boxes. Although launched as a chocolate-chip cookie dough flavor, since their introduction there have been a variety of flavors released. Originally launched in movie theaters in the US in 1997 they are now available in many areas of the world including Canada, the Caribbean, Mexico, the UK, Europe/EU, several Middle Eastern countries, Australia and New Zealand.

== History ==
Scott Samet and Douglas Chu founded Taste of Nature, Inc. in 1992 to manufacture and sell healthier alternative snacks to the movie theater and bulk trade. A lack of growth caused the company to start experimenting with candy products in 1995, leading to their first chocolate-coated cookie dough product that was sold to the bulk trade. The company realized they could create a more appealing product by increasing the amount of dough in each piece and subsequently created their own brand and packaging, launching Cookie Dough Bites in 1997.

== Production process ==
The television show Unwrapped hosted by Mark Summers showcases how Cookie Dough Bites are made. Co-founder Douglas Chu states that they needed to keep their product shelf-stable, so one key ingredient in cookie dough had to be removed: "We have a special egg-free formula that allows the product to stay fresh on the shelf about a year." Choosing chocolate chip as their primary flavor was the obvious choice, as it is the USA's most popular cookie, and they developed an approach to replicate that: "We based our primary formula based on a chocolate chip cookie, we took it a step further by adding a coating of chocolate so that people could really get that burst of chocolate flavor to each piece they eat. Through extensive testing, we've found that an equal 1/1 ratio from chocolate coating to cookie dough center is what people prefer." Each cookie dough bite also sports a thin glossy coating. "One coat of gum arabic gives the bites a glossy sheen, allowing them to keep their shape and avoid sticking together." The factory can produce 20,000+ pounds of Cookie Dough Bites per day and while the recipe is similar to actual cookie dough, Chu warns that it is not; "It is ultimately candy and not meant to be baked."

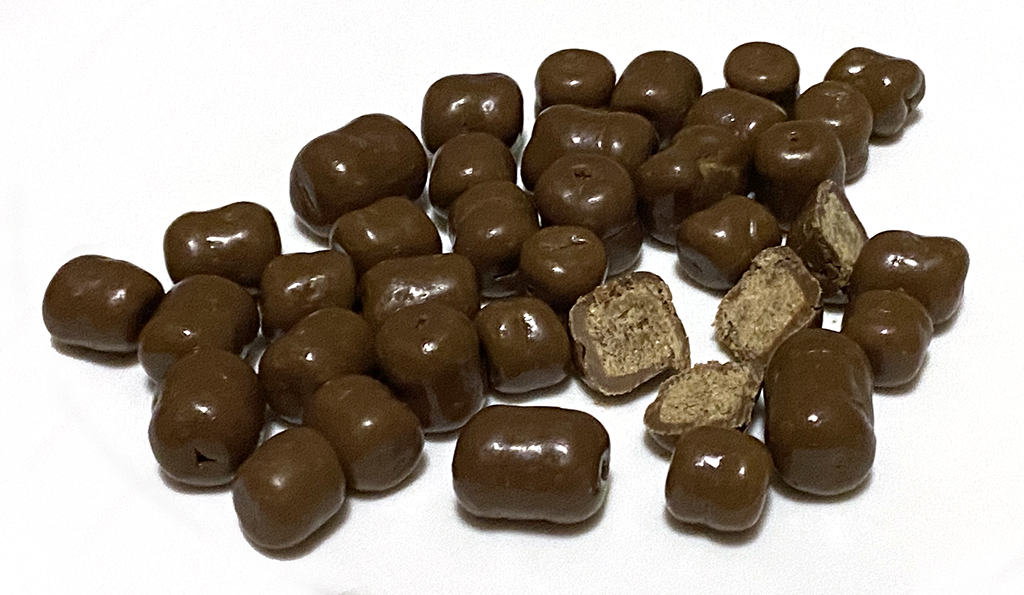

== Nutritional facts ==
The article "Cookie Dough Bites nutrition information" states, Cookie Dough Bites primarily consist of chocolate (sugar, whole milk, cocoa butter). There are 190 calories in a ½ package serving size of Chocolate Chip Cookie Dough Bites candy. The calorie breakdown is: 42% fat, 54% carbs, 4% protein.

== Variety ==
Cookie Dough Bites consist of various cookie and cake-inspired flavors and varieties. The variety differentiate themselves with its core cookie dough center, but also through its coating, utilizing dark chocolate and white crème (white chocolate) at times. There are even Chocolate Chip Cookie Dough Bites and Red Velvet bites-flavored sodas released in recent years.

== Flavors ==
Although not all of these flavors are currently in production, many remain in distribution:

- Chocolate Chip Cookie Dough Bites
- Mint Chocolate Chip Cookie Dough Bites
- Dark Chocolate Chip Cookie Dough Bites
- Peanut Butter Cookie Dough Bites
- Fudge Brownie Cookie Dough Bites
- Cookies 'n Cream Bites
- Red Velvet Cupcake Bites
- Cupcake Bites
- Strawberry Dream Bites
- Birthday Cake Cookie Dough Bites
- Cinnamon Bun Cookie Dough Bites
- S'moresels
- Moon Pie Bites
- Gingerbread

== Trivia ==
After launching exclusively in movie theaters, the first outlet that Cookie Dough Bites were sold in was Blockbuster.

Cookie Dough Bites candy was released in the late 1990s but they may have been ahead of their time. Eater.com reported that 2017 was "set to be the breakout year for edible cookie dough". Google Trends showed that search interest in "edible cookie dough" was at the highest index it had ever been in 2017.

Douglas Chu and Scott Samet started their company from scratch "in the back of Doug's parents house" with each contributing $5,000 of their own money.

In 2018, the manufacturer of Cookie Dough Bites candy became an actual cookie manufacturer when it took over the production and sales of Mrs. Fields pre-packaged cookies.
