= Chocolate chip cookie =

Drop cookie featuring chocolate chips

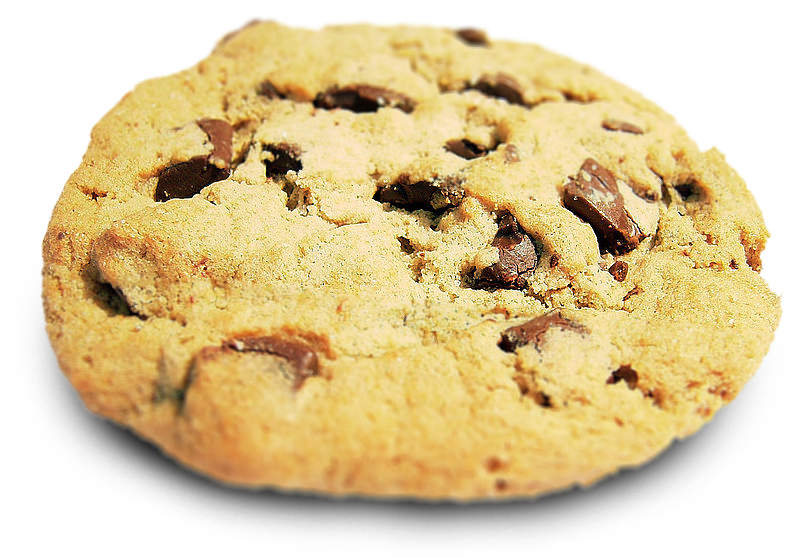
A chocolate chip cookie

A chocolate chip cookie is a drop cookie that contains pieces of chocolate mixed into the dough before baking. Texture and appearance vary with ingredients and preparation, ranging from moist, chewy cookies to ones that are crispy.

Chocolate chip cookies are closely associated with the United States, where they are the most popular cookie. Their invention is generally credited to Massachusetts chef and hotelier Ruth Graves Wakefield in the 1930s, although versions existed that preceded hers. Over the 20th century they gained popularity through their association with the Swiss company Nestlé, their distribution to American troops in World War II, and the development of new versions in the 1970s and 1980s by manufacturers such as Famous Amos and Mrs. Fields.

Chocolate chip cookies are made from eggs, white and brown sugar, flour, a leavener, fat, vanilla, and small pieces of chocolate. The starch in the flour is responsible for the cookie's ability to set, while brown sugar and the practice of adding eggs one at a time contribute to chewiness. Nuts and other inclusions are sometimes added, and spin-offs have been developed including chocolate chip cookie dough ice cream and an ice cream sandwich.

== Ingredients ==
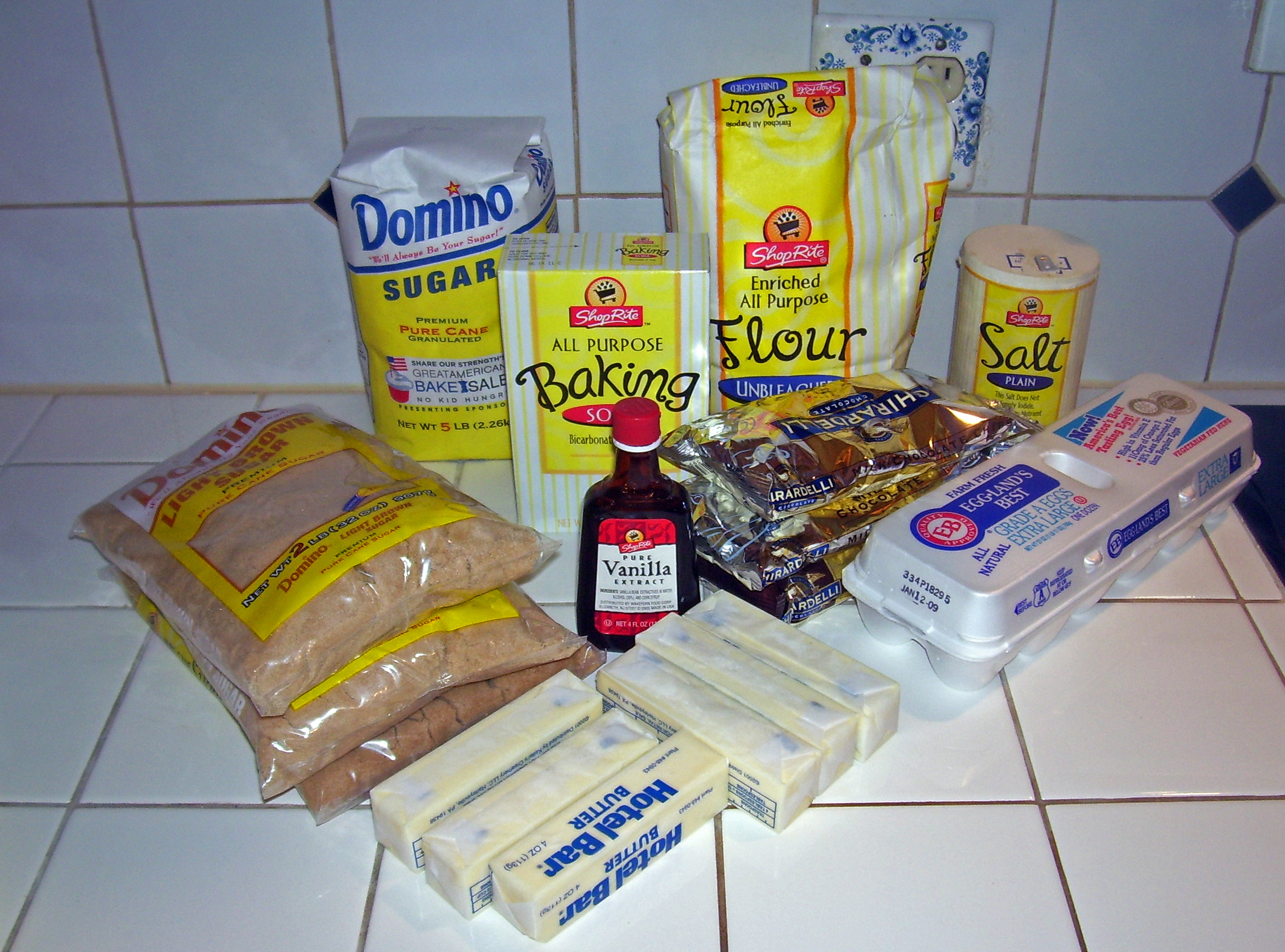
Standard ingredients

Chocolate chip cookies are commonly made with white sugar, brown sugar, flour, salt, eggs, a leavening agent such as baking soda, a fat, typically butter or shortening, vanilla extract, and chocolate pieces. Some recipes also include milk or nuts (such as chopped walnuts) in the dough. Choice and ratio of ingredients produce different cookies: some soft and chewy, others crispy.

The choice of sugar impacts crispiness and chewiness. Brown sugar is hygroscopic, absorbing liquid from the environment to produce a moist, chewy cookie. A chocolate chip cookie made exclusively from brown sugar has difficulty holding itself together, and for this reason, recipe writers often include both white and brown sugars, the white sugar contributing crispiness.

Baking soda makes chocolate chip cookies more brown and thick, neutralizing the dough's typically acidic environment. Most recipes call for more baking soda than is necessary for neutralization, although its presence is rarely detected due to the dominant flavors of chocolate, brown sugar, and vanilla. Eggs and shortening make cookies even more stout and puffy. In contrast with such a puffy chocolate chip cookie, adding milk to the dough or using butter as a fat produces thinner cookies.

Flour absorbs liquid, limiting cookie spread in baking. This is most pronounced in flours with high protein content. Such differences in absorption are credited by biochemist Shirley Corriher with the poor modern reputation of chocolate chip cookie preparations following the original Toll House cookie recipe. Wakefield, Corriher writes, was likely working with flours containing more protein than modern bakers, and her cookies would have spread as little as a modern chocolate chip cookie made with cake flour. (Note: To the end of a more dry dough that spreads less as it bakes, Corriher also notes Wakefield's practice of chilling cookie dough overnight.)

Flour also lends chocolate chip cookies their ability to set via its starch content. In the starch gelatinization process, starch granules are heated and absorb water until they rupture and form a paste. When chocolate chip cookies are prepared to accommodate a gluten-free diet, different starches are chosen, including corn, potato, and pea starches. The choice of starch is influenced by how similar the resulting dough flows to a typical cookie dough.

Chocolate typically comes in chip form, replacing some or all cocoa butter with vegetable fats to prevent deformation in baking. Other types of chocolate that appear in chocolate chip cookies include M&Ms, chocolate chunks, or bars cut into pieces. Variants of chocolate chip cookies are made by introducing other inclusions, such as broken pieces of candy, white chocolate, candied ginger, and macadamia nuts.

== Preparation ==
Video of preparation

Most chocolate chip cookies are made with the creaming process, wherein sugar and a soft fat are whipped together, producing a light, aerated mixture as sharp edges of sugar crystals produce bubbles throughout the fat. This is not the only method, however, and some chocolate chip cookies are made with melted butter, producing smaller yields. After the fat and sugar have been creamed, eggs are added one at a time, the bowl scraped between additions. Adding eggs in stages takes less time to combine than adding all at once and makes cookies that are more consistent, chewy, and less inclined to spread in baking.

At this point, some recipes call for the mixture to rest briefly, allowing some of the sugar to dissolve. During baking, this dissolved sugar caramelizes more readily, producing a cookie with a slight sheen, craggy surface, and chewy center. After the eggs, dry ingredients are added and mixed. Once the dough is partially mixed, chocolate chips are added, and mixing resumes until fully combined. When baked in a baking dish instead of a cookie sheet, a chocolate chip bar cookie, also known as congo bars or blondies, is produced.

== History ==
=== Early ===
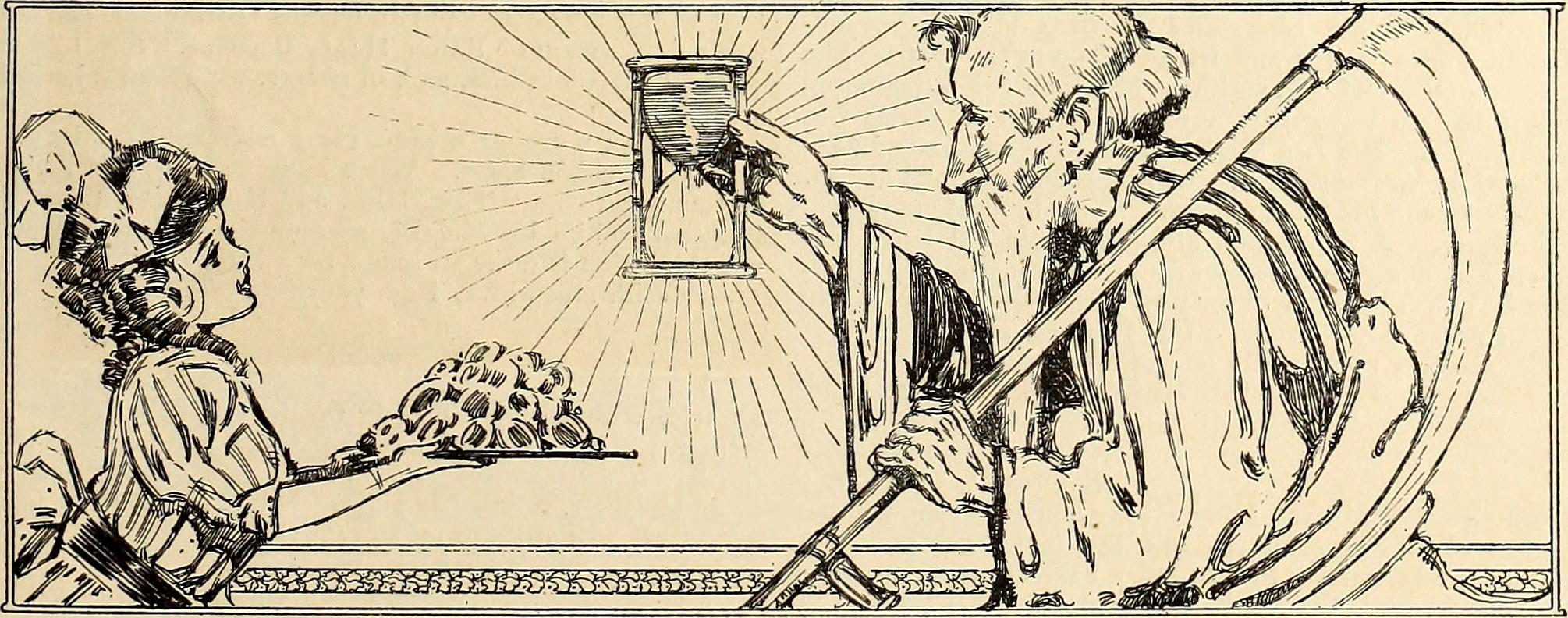
Illustration of a girl holding a pile of jumbles, 1873

The most common account of the creation of the chocolate chip cookie credits the American chef Ruth Graves Wakefield in the 1930s, though such accounts agree that chocolate had appeared in cookies earlier. Such earlier cookies contained chocolate in grated and melted forms, lacking the discrete pieces of chocolate that define chocolate chip varieties. These early cookies evolved from jumbles, a cookie popular in the late 1800s that was made by dropping unshaped dough onto a sheet pan. Bakers flavored jumbles with what was at hand, sometimes including chocolate. By the 1870s, chocolate jumbles emerged as a distinct form rather than a simple variation, helped by the price of chocolate dropping. The ingredient ratios in these cookies closely resembled those of modern chocolate chip cookies, and through the 1880s and 1890s, chocolate jumbles were very popular in America.

It is at this time that food writer Stella Parks suggests the first chocolate chip cookies appeared. Grating chocolate with 19th-century technology was a slow and laborious process, and not everyone had a grater. In her 2017 book BraveTart, Parks says, "at a time when bakers relied on intuition over explicit judgement, I think the recipe's popularity hinged on an unspoken shortcut: grabbing a knife." Although these recipes did not describe chocolate jumbles as drop cookies, by the early 1900s recipes for "Chocolate Drops" did, and Parks proposes that the dough's sticky quality meant "ain't no way folks tried to roll it out". By 1928, chocolate chip cookies were being sold commercially in Wisconsin, and throughout the early 1930s, supermarkets in the Midwest and northeastern US were selling versions, with corporate manufacturers in Illinois, Michigan, and Pennsylvania producing chocolate chip cookies by 1937.

=== Toll House cookie creation ===
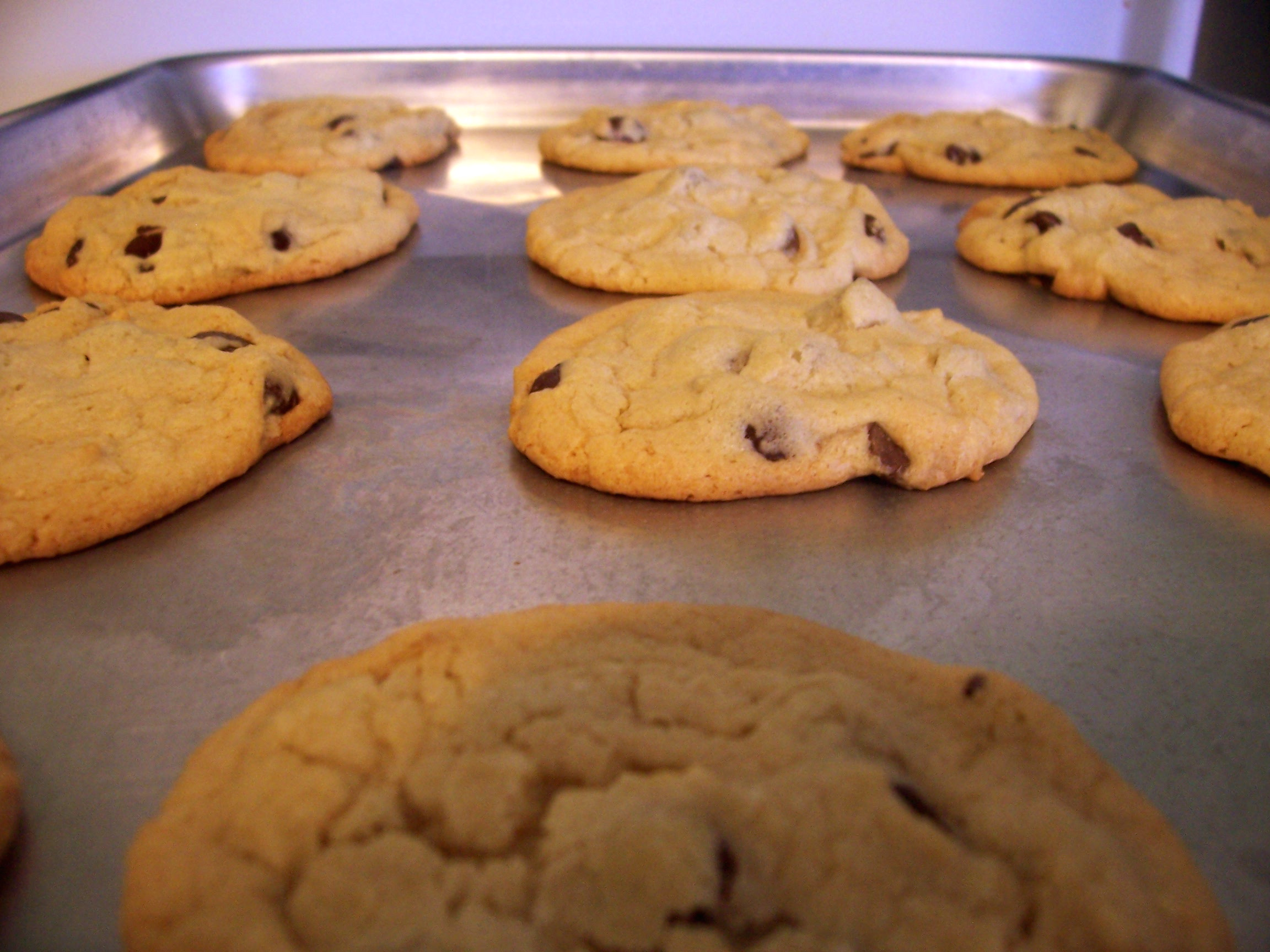
Toll House cookie

Ruth Wakefield created her recipe for chocolate chip cookies in the 1930s, although sources differ on the specific year. With her husband Kenneth, Wakefield owned and ran the Toll House Inn, a hotel and restaurant in Whitman, Massachusetts, that was well-known in the region. Several accounts exist of how Wakefield created her recipe for chocolate chip cookies, with older versions describing an accidental invention and more modern versions arguing that Wakefield created it intentionally.

In the most popular version of an accidental creation, Wakefield is said to have been preparing a cookie studded with nuts but realised she had run out, either due to poor stock management or Depression shortages. On the spot, Wakefield substituted chocolate for the nuts, chopping a bar of chocolate into pieces. In other versions, the chocolate was added to provide cocoa butter when the Toll House Inn was out of butter, in a frugal effort to use up excess stock, or in the hope that the chocolate would melt during baking when there was not the time to melt it ahead of time. One ex-employee, dissenting from the narrative popular among her colleagues that it was created during a nut shortage, describes vibrations from a mixer causing chocolate to drop into cookie dough, with the ex-employee crediting her father with convincing Wakefield to bake the cookies regardless.

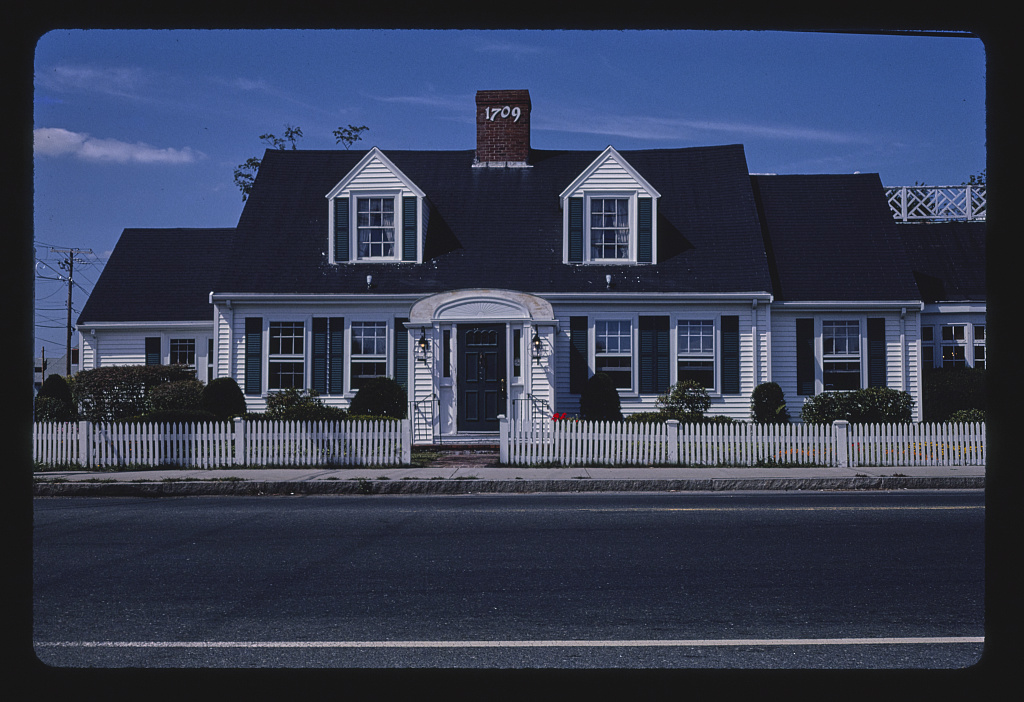
Toll House Inn, photographed in 1984

Modern food writers argue that such accounts are improbable, highlighting Wakefield's training in home economics and how organized her kitchen was. Wakefield did not comment on the recipe's creation until the 1970s when she said, "we had been serving a thin butterscotch nut cookie with ice cream. Everybody seemed to love it, but I was trying to give them something different. So I came up with Toll House cookie." To other reporters around the same time, she elaborated: The recipe was formed while Wakefield was returning from Egypt. It was made by breaking up a Nestlé semi-sweet chocolate bar with an ice pick and adding it to a brown sugar dough, which had appeared in some contemporary cookbooks by Wakefield and others. She was inspired by college classes in food chemistry and was assisted by the Toll House Inn's pastry chef, Sue Brides.

The Toll House cookies were first published in Wakefield's 1938 edition of Toll House Tried and True Recipes under the name Toll House Chocolate Crunch Cookies. The ratios of ingredients were like that of the earlier chocolate jumbles but contained half the eggs and a sugar that was half brown and half white. The dough was chilled overnight, shaped with metal rings, baked until crisp and brown, and served with ice cream.

==== Original recipe ====
In 2017, Brides's daughter shared what she said was the original recipe:

- 1 1/2 cups (350 mL) shortening
- 1 1/8 cups (265 mL) sugar
- 1 1/8 cups (265 mL) brown sugar
- 3 eggs
- 1 1/2 teaspoon (7.5 g) salt
- 3 1/8 cups (750 mL) of flour
- 1 1/2 teaspoon (7.5 g) hot water
- 1 1/2 teaspoon (7.5 g) baking soda
- 1 1/2 teaspoon (7.5 g) vanilla
- chocolate chips (and walnuts)

=== Later ===
Before its 1938 publication in Toll House Tried and True Recipes, recipes for the Toll House chocolate chip cookie were already being distributed. The first of these were to customers, who received a printed copy upon request. One of these was Marjorie Husted, a home economist who created and for a time voiced the Betty Crocker character for General Mills. Husted soon organized an appearance for Wakefield on the first episode of her new radio show, where Wakefield discussed her cookies and inn. The recipe soon gained prominence in Boston newspapers under various names, including, by February 1939, "chocolate chip cookies". Explanations vary for how the name "chip" arose: food historian Carolyn Wyman describes it as a possible reference to pieces of the chocolate being chipped away with an ice pick, while Parks suggests chips could connote the "shards and shavings" left behind after chopping chocolate.

By this time in 1939, Wakefield was fielding multiple offers from chocolate manufacturers looking to receive Wakefield's endorsement after noticing sales in the New England area had been recently inflated. In March, she formed such an agreement with a New York licensed manufacturer of Nestlé chocolate who committed to featuring the Toll House recipe on chocolate wrappers. A year later, this was expanded into an agreement with Nestlé itself to feature the recipe on all chocolate packaging, as well as in advertisements across America. For her deals with Nestlé, Wakefield said she was promised a dollar, and in some anecdotes, she is described as receiving a lifetime supply of chocolate.

Now with the right to publish the recipe, Nestlé faced the problem that home bakers did not need to use Nestlé chocolate specifically to make chocolate chip cookies, especially as other chocolate and pantry staple manufacturers began including their own recipes for chocolate chip cookies on packaging. By late 1939, Nestlé was selling chocolate bars broken into 160 segments, and the following year they began selling small, tear-shaped pieces of chocolate under the name morsels. As the United States entered World War II, much of the chocolate supply went to soldiers, and advertising positioned baking chocolate chip cookies as a patriotic act. The Toll House Inn began sending cookies to stationed soldiers, and the son of a then-employee credits this period with nuts being dropped from the original recipe due to their tendency to go bad in transit. As they were served to soldiers from across the US, their popularity extended beyond the eastern states.

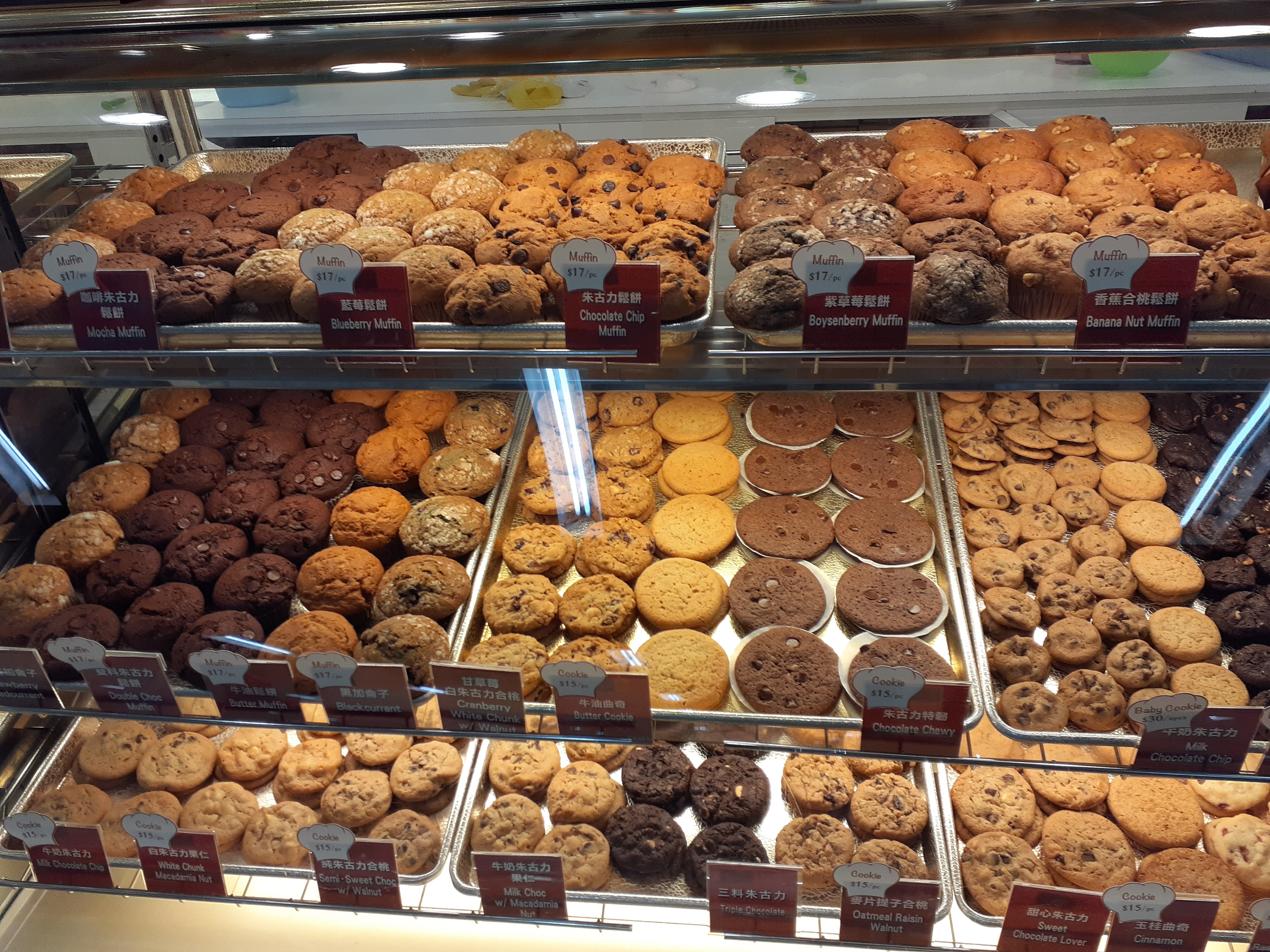
Mrs. Fields store in 2020

In the 1950s, chocolate chip cookie baking mixes were released by Pilsbury and Nestlé, and in 1959, Pilsbury released a refrigerated cookie dough to market. By the 1970s, chocolate chip cookies were the most popular cookie in America, and a series of entrepreneurs began selling their versions of the cookies, starting with Famous Amos in 1975, followed by Mrs. Fields in 1977, and David Liederman's in 1979. The chocolate chip cookies these businesses produced varied: Amos made small cookies out of margarine and pecans, while Fields made large cookies with macadamia, (Note: According to Wyman, Fields began making larger cookies after her mother questioned her as to how many cookies she was eating.) the latter bringing about a home baking trend of large chocolate chip cookies. 1979 also marked the end of Nestlé's agreement with Wakefield to put her recipe on their packaging, and they took the opportunity to modify it for the modern kitchen, omitting steps to sift flour and produce a paste of baking powder and water. Throughout the 1980s, over a thousand stores baking chocolate chip cookies competed with each other and producers mass-producing for supermarkets. Pepperidge Farm released a larger chocolate chip cookie, and the chocolate chip cookie ice cream sandwich was created.

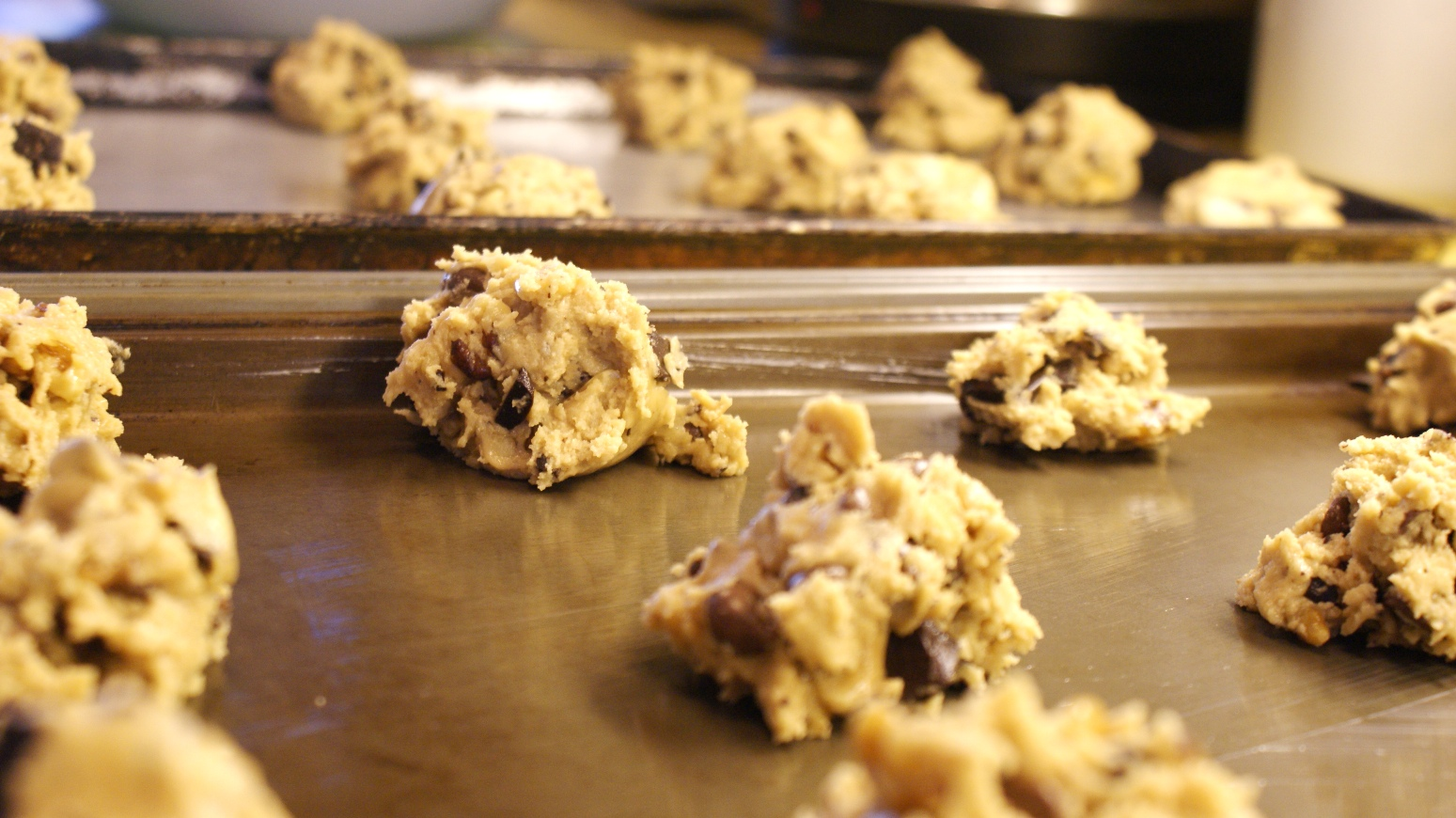
Raw chocolate chip cookie dough

In late 1987, the US economy crashed, and stores selling chocolate chip cookies shuttered. During the following decade, this trend continued as health concerns gained prominence. Through the 1990s, supermarket product lines selling chocolate chip cookie dough expanded, upending the dominance of products branded with the Pillsbury Doughboy. Ben & Jerry's released an ice cream variety containing raw chocolate chip cookie dough, the eggs pasteurized to counter the risk of salmonella infection. In the late 2000s and early 2010s, large chunks of chocolate and the practice of eating raw cookie dough became subjects of popular discourse, the latter making the news in 2009 when 77 people fell ill eating refrigerated cookie dough, the source traced to unpasteurized flour. Later in the 2010s, large, flat, rippled chocolate chip cookies became popular on social media, produced by removing the baking sheet from the oven midway through cooking and striking it against a surface several times. Chocolate chip cookies also became popular in France in the same period, although as of 2015 they were still less dominant than the classic French baked goods.

== In culture ==
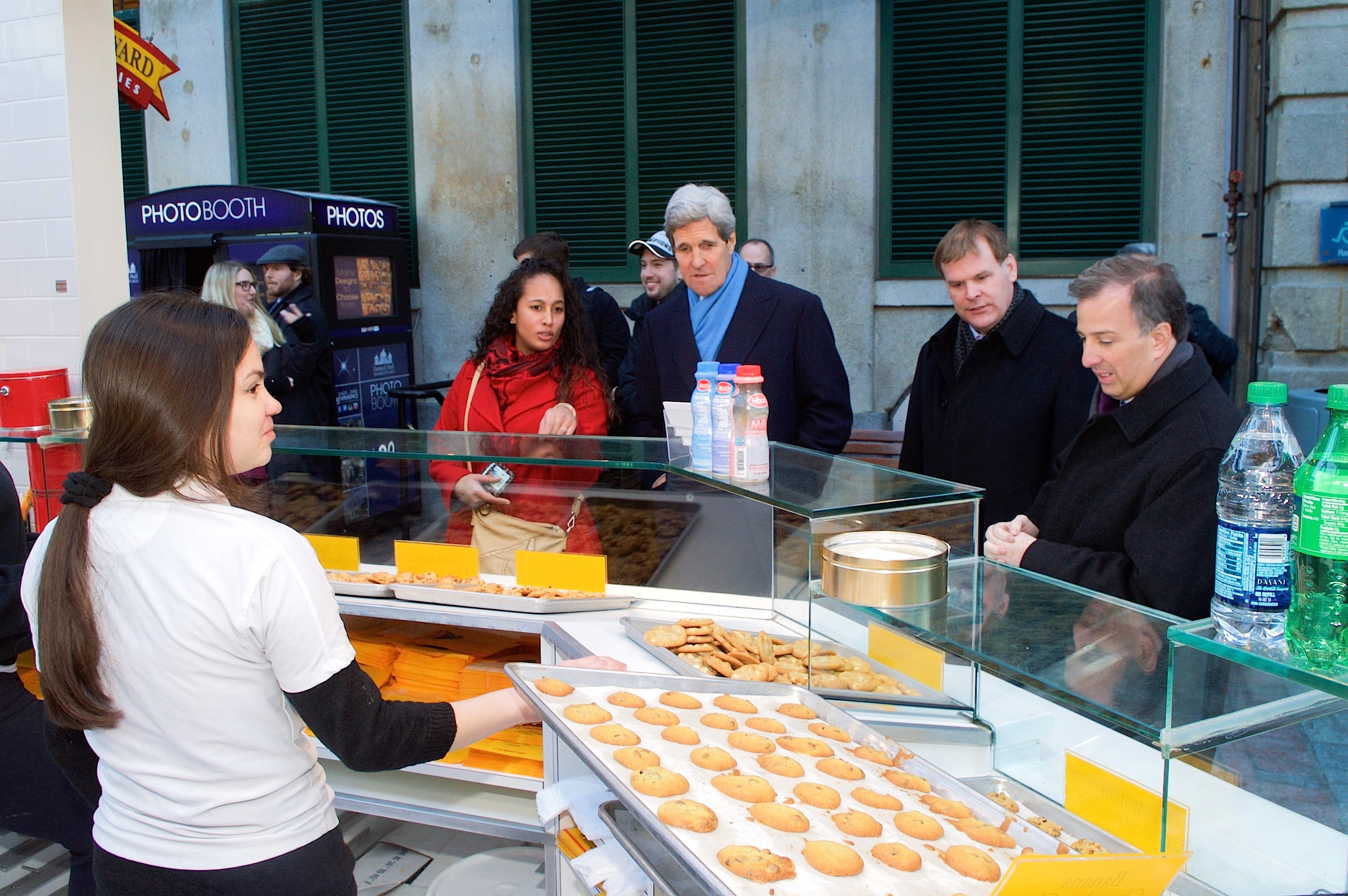
Politicians John Kerry, John Baird, and José Antonio Meade buy chocolate chip cookies

The chocolate chip cookie is closely associated with the United States. As of the early 2010s, it was the country's most popular, particularly in a home baking context. They are sold in supermarkets, bodegas, and bakeries, by themselves or in ice cream, or ice cream sandwiches. Among tourists from some countries, eating an American chocolate chip cookie is an important part of a trip, and as of 2014, Nestlé only printed recipes in English on the side of their chocolate chips to maintain the association.

Multiple food writers have described chocolate chip biscuit consumption and manufacture as gendered. In 2006, food writer Bunny Crumpacker described men having a preference for large, chewy cookies containing chunks of chocolate and nuts. Eight years later, Wyman posited that many men approach "chocolate chip cookie making with the same fetishism previously reserved for chili or barbecue." Women, specifically moms, are identified as most of those purchasing chocolate chips and refrigerated chocolate chip cookie dough by Nestlé representatives.

Several businesses provide chocolate chip cookies to patrons as a marketing device. DoubleTree hotels are known for this practice, providing guests with warm cookies on arrival, and Midwest Airlines baked their chocolate chip cookies in flight. The distinctive scent of freshly baked chocolate chip cookies has also been used by marketers; including in the Got Milk? campaign, wherein bus stop billboards released smells until their cancellation after complaints. In Massachusetts, the chocolate chip cookie was designated as the Official State Cookie in 1997 in reference to the story of Ruth Wakefield creating the cookie in a Massachusetts inn.

== See also ==
- Cookie Dough Bites (candy)
- List of cookies
- Oatmeal raisin cookie
- Peanut butter cookie

== Sources ==
- Amendola, Joseph; Rees, Nicole (2003). Understanding Baking: The Art and Science of Baking (3rd ed.). Hoboken: Wiley. ISBN 0471405469.
- BeMiller, James N; Whistler, Roy L (1996). "Carbohydrates". In Fennema, Owen R (ed.). Food Chemistry. New York: Marcel Dekker. ISBN 0-8247-9346-3.
- Casper, Jeffrey L; Atwell, William A (2014). Gluten-Free Baked Products. St. Paul, Minnesota: AACC Worldwide. ISBN 978-1-891127-80-9.
- Civitello, Linda (2017). Baking Powder Wars: The Cutthroat Food Fight that Revolutionized Cooking. Urbana, Illinois: University of Illinois Press. ISBN 978-0-252-04108-2.
- Corriher, Shirley (1997). CookWise: The Hows and Whys of Successful Cooking (1st ed.). New York: William Morrow & Company, Inc. ISBN 0-688-10229-8.
- Corriher, Shirley (2008). BakeWise: The Hows and Whys of Successful Baking with Over 200 Magnificent Recipes. Simon and Schuster. ISBN 978-1-4165-6078-4.
- Crosby, Guy; et al. (Editors at America's Test Kitchen) (2012). The Science of Good Cooking. America's Test Kitchen. ISBN 978-1-933615-98-1.
- Crumpacker, Bunny (1999). Old-Time Brand-Name Desserts. New York: Smithmark. ISBN 0-7651-1653-7.
- Crumpacker, Bunny (2006). The Sex Life of Food: When Body and Soul Meet to Eat. New York: Thomas Dunne Books. ISBN 978-0-312-36376-5.
- Deutsch, Jonathon M (2007). "Airline Food". In Allen, Gary; Albala, Ken (eds.). The Business of Food: Encyclopedia of the Food and Drink Industries. Greenwood Press. ISBN 978-0-313-06917-8.
- Goldstein, Darra, ed. (2015). The Oxford Companion to Sugar and Sweets. Oxford University Press. ISBN 978-0-19-931339-6.
  - Dodge, Jim. "Drop Cookies". In Goldstein (2015).
  - Willan, Anne. "France". In Goldstein (2015).
- Dutch, Jennifer Rachel (2018). The Rhetoric of American Home Cooking Traditions in the Twenty-First Century. Jackson, Mississippi: University Press of Mississippi. ISBN 978-1-496-81876-8.
- Kanner, Allen D (July 2009). "The Piracy of Privacy: Why Marketers Must Bare Our Souls". Tikkun. Vol. 24, no. 4.
- Miller, Tim (2017). American Home Cooking: A Popular History. London: Rowman & Littlefield. ISBN 978-1-442-25345-2.
- Parks, Stella (2017). BraveTart: Iconic American Desserts. W. W. Norton & Company. ISBN 978-0-393-63427-3.
- Patent, Greg (2002). Baking in America: Traditional and Contemporary Favorites From the Past 200 Yeares. Boston & New York: Houghton Mifflin Company. ISBN 0-618-04831-6.
- Rinsky, Glenn; Rinsky, Laura Halpin (2009). The Pastry Chef's Companion. Hoboken, New Jersey: John Wiley & Sons. ISBN 978-0-470-00955-0.
- Smith, Andrew F., ed. (2013). The Oxford Encyclopedia of Food and Drink in America (2nd ed.). New York: Oxford University Press. ISBN 978-0-19-973496-2.
  - Lovegren, Sylvia. "Historical Overview". In Smith (2013).
  - Mercuri, Becky. "Cookies". In Smith (2013).
- Suas, Michel (2009). Advanced Bread and Pastry: A Professional Approach. Clifton Park, New York: Delamar Cengage Group. ISBN 978-1-4180-1169-7.
- Wyman, Carolyn (2014). The Great American Chocolate Chip Cookie Book. Countryman Press. ISBN 978-1-581-57162-2.
