= Toll House Inn =

1930–1984 hotel in Whitman, Massachusetts

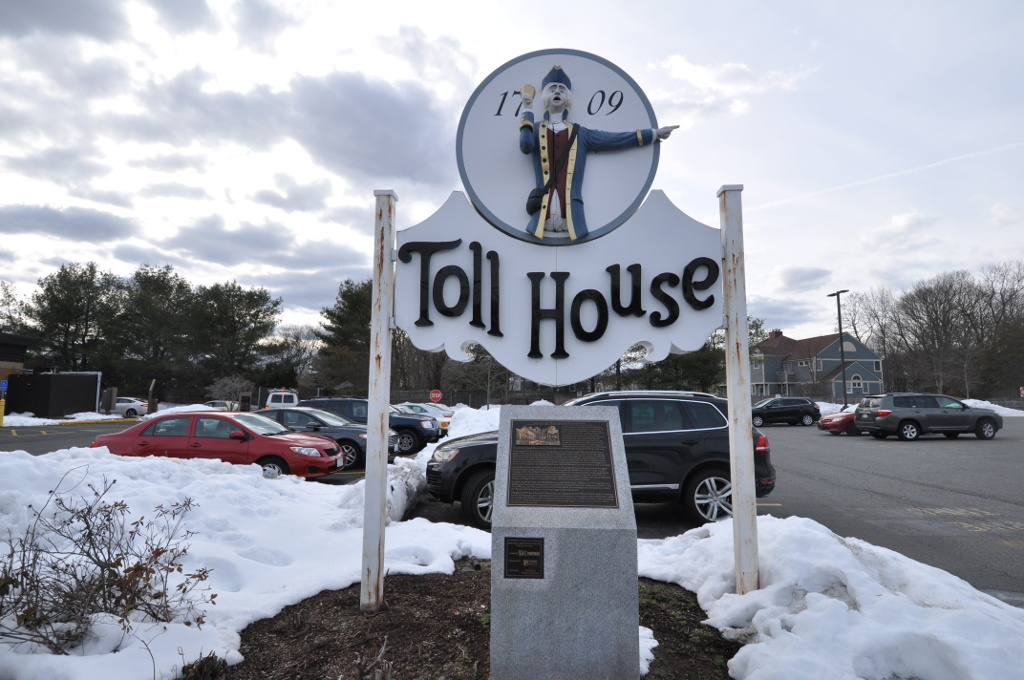
- The restored sign of the Toll House Inn, with a commemorative plaque underneath
- Interactive map of the Toll House Inn area

General information
- Location: 362 Bedford Street, Whitman, Massachusetts, U.S.
- Coordinates: 42.0709°N 70.94825°W
- Opened: 1930
- Demolished: 1984; 42 years ago
- Owner: Ruth Graves Wakefield

The Toll House Inn was an inn located in Whitman, Massachusetts, established in 1930 by Kenneth and Ruth Graves Wakefield. The Toll House chocolate chip cookies are named after the inn.

== History ==
Contrary to its name and the sign, which still stands despite the building having burned down in 1984, the site was never a toll house, and it was built in 1817, not 1709. The use of "toll house" and "1709" was a marketing strategy.

Ruth Wakefield cooked all the food served and soon gained local fame for her desserts. According to early accounts, Wakefield created the first chocolate chip cookie using a bar of semi-sweet chocolate made by Nestlé while adapting her butter drop dough cookie recipe. In 1938, Wakefield and her assistant, Sue Brides, used chocolate after wanting to "do something a little more interesting with" their already popular butterscotch nut cookie.

The new dessert soon became very popular. Wakefield contacted Nestlé and they struck a deal: the company would print her recipe on the cover of all their semi-sweet chocolate bars, and she would get a lifetime supply of chocolate. Nestlé began marketing chocolate chips to be used especially for cookies. Wakefield wrote a cookbook, Toll House Tried and True Recipes, that went through 39 printings.

Wakefield died in 1977, and the Toll House Inn burned down from a fire that started in the kitchen on New Year's Eve 1984. The inn was not rebuilt. The site, at 362 Bedford Street, is marked with a historical marker and mounted restored sign. Although there are many manufacturers of chocolate chips today, Nestlé still publishes Wakefield's recipe on the back of each package of Toll House Morsels.

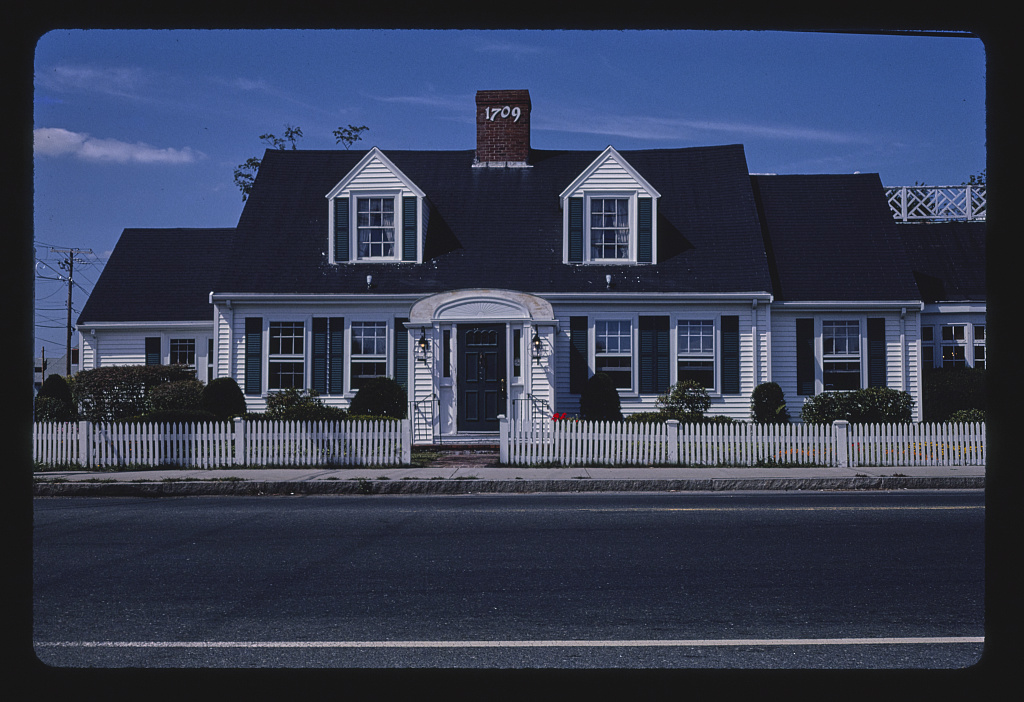
Toll House Inn Restaurant, Route 18, Whitman, Massachusetts, prior to destruction in 1984 fire
