= FFV =

FFV may refer to:

== Entertainment ==
- FLOWERS for VASES / descansos, studio album by Hayley Williams from Paramore
- Family Force 5, an American band
- Fatal Frame V, a 2014 video game
- Final Fantasy V, a 1992 video game

== Transportation ==
- Fairfield–Vacaville station, Amtrak station code FFV
- Fast Flying Virginian, a defunct American passenger train
- Fly540, a Kenyan airline
- Ford-Utilimaster FFV, an American light transport truck model

== Science and technology ==
- Flexible-fuel vehicle, a type of vehicle
- Feline foamy virus, a pathogen of cats

== Other uses ==
- First Families of Virginia
- Famous Foods of Virginia, also known as the Southern Biscuit Company
- Football Federation Victoria, in Australia
- Franciscans of Life (Latin: Fratres Franciscani Vitae)
- French Sailing Federation (French: Fédération Française de Voile)
- Försvarets fabriksverk/Förenade fabriksverken, the Swedish arms manufacturing agency
