= Food for the gods =

Filipino dessert

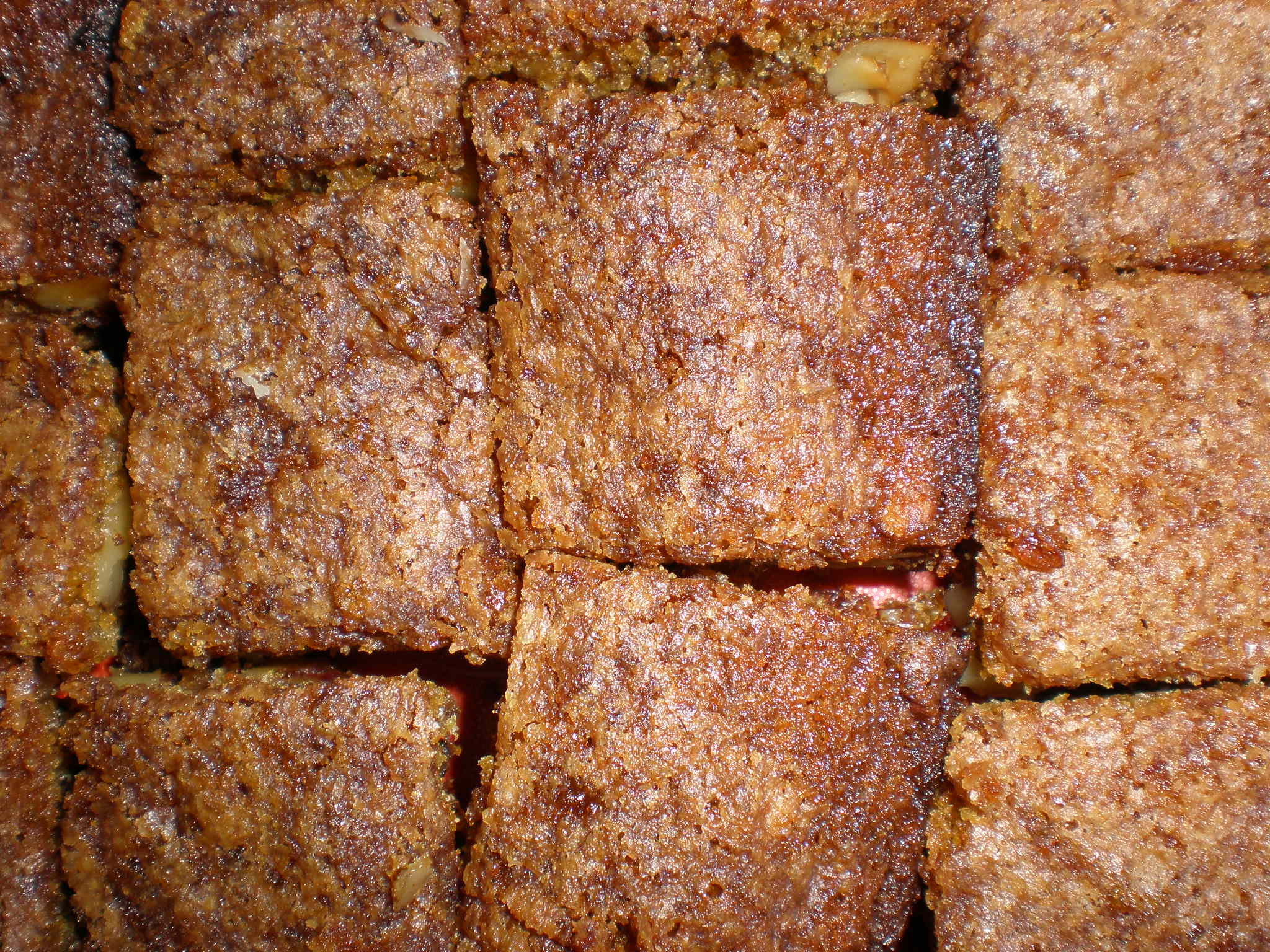
- Alternative names: Pagkain para sa mga diyos
- Type: Dessert bar
- Course: Dessert
- Place of origin: Philippines, Spain, United States
- Associated cuisine: Filipino
- Invented: 1900s

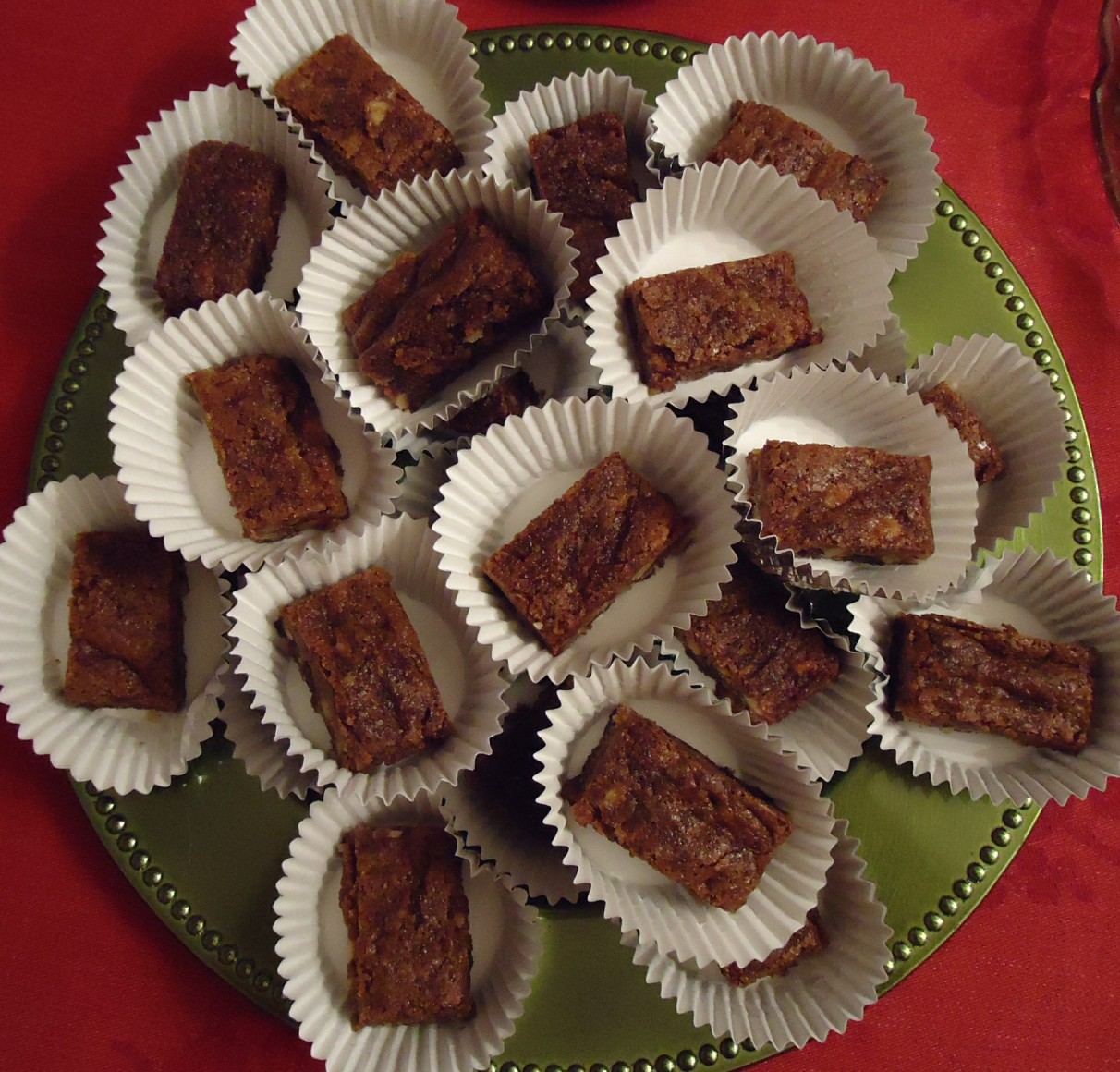
Pieces of food for the gods served at a party

Food for the gods, sometimes known as a date bar or date and walnut bar, is a Filipino pastry dessert similar to the American dessert bar. Dates and walnuts are some of the main ingredients. The food is popular during the Christmas season, when they are wrapped in colored cellophane and sometimes given as gifts.

== History ==
It is unknown how food for the gods originated, but an early written account of a "food for the gods" pudding with dates and walnuts appears in a 1909 community cookbook for a Michigan branch of the General Federation of Women's Clubs. One theory posits it came from the Spanish pan de dátiles, date bread, when they colonized the Philippines. When the United States took over control, the recipe may have been altered to where it is today. Another theory states that the dessert was entirely American and was adapted into Philippine cuisine during that time instead. They may have also been inspired by American date squares. At the time, dates and walnuts were very luxurious and were considered only for divine consumption. Alternatively, the gods may have referred to the wealthy or those with superiority. Food for the gods has been recorded to be popular in the Philippines since the 1900s and became even more so during the 1930s.

== Description ==
Food for the gods is similar to the American blondie in that it is a firm but soft, cookie-like pastry. Some of the main differences are the addition of dates and walnuts and the harder crust around the top and bottom in contrast with the softer middle. It is buttery and chewy. Medjool dates and chopped walnuts are commonly added. It may also be eaten with vanilla ice cream or whipped cream.

== Preparation ==
Chef Isa Fabro, writing for The Washington Post, explained that the flour, baking powder, baking soda, and salt were first mixed in a bowl, then combined with the dates and chopped, toasted walnuts to coat them. Next, the butter, sugars, vanilla extract, and eggs were mixed separately, with the coated chunks being added when done. The mixture will be then poured into a pan and baked for around 40-45 minutes. The final result should have a golden crust with a softer middle.

== See also ==
- List of Philippine desserts
- Date and walnut loaf
- Date square
