= Girl Scout Cookies =

Cookies sold by the Girl Scout Organization

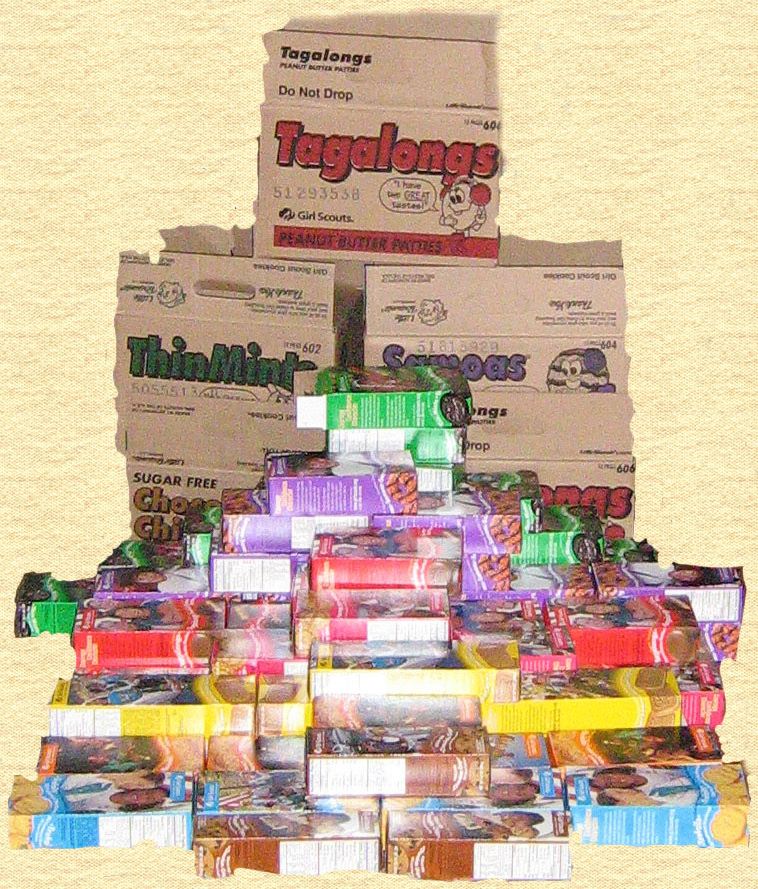
A variety of Girl Scout Cookies

Girl Scout Cookies are cookies sold by Girl Scouts in the United States to raise funds to support Girl Scout councils and individual troops. The cookies are widely popular and are commonly sold by going door-to-door, online, through school or town fundraisers, or at "cookie booths" set up at storefronts. The program is intended to both raise money and improve the financial literacy of girls. During an average selling season (usually January through April), more than one million girls sell over 200 million packages of cookies and raise over $800 million. The first known sale of cookies by Girl Scouts was in 1917. Cookie sales are organized by 112 regional Girl Scout councils who select one of two national bakeries to buy cookies from.

The bakery selected determines which cookie varieties are available, when girls can begin selling cookies in their area, and cookie price. The bakery is paid about 25 to 35 percent of the profits; 45 to 65 percent is used by the regional council to cover programming costs; and 10 to 20 percent is kept by the local troop whose members decide how to spend their portion of the funds. A regional council receives up to 60 percent of its budget from cookie sales.

== History ==
The 5 skills the “cookie program" is intended to develop:

- Goal Setting
- Decision Making
- Money Management
- People Skills
- Business Ethics

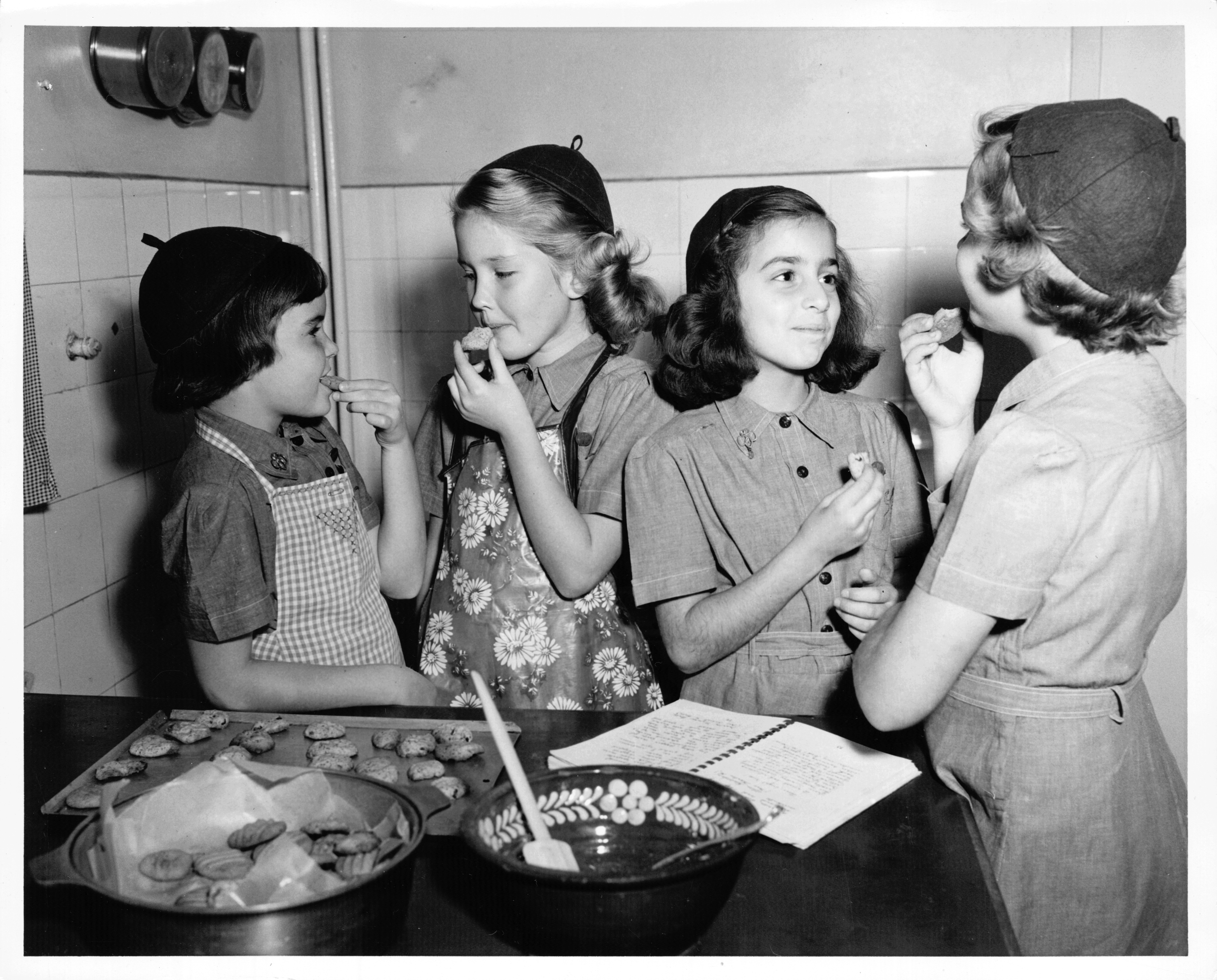
Four Girl Scouts sample the cookies they have been baking

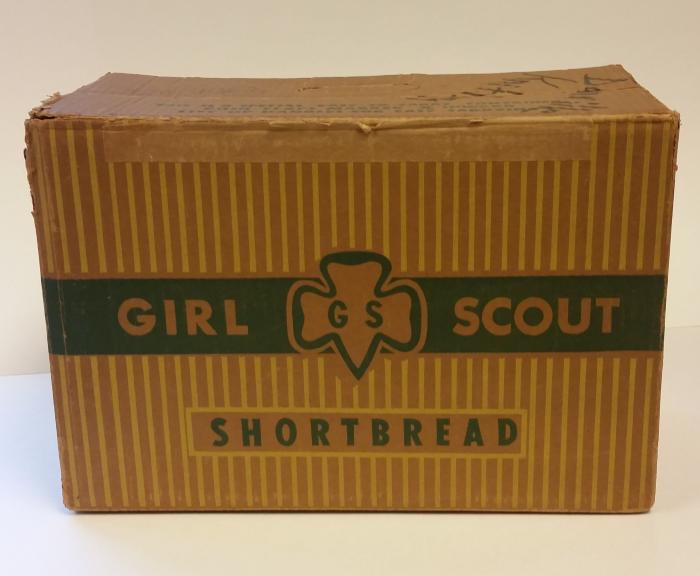
Girl Scout cookie box of Girl Scout Shortbread cookies, baked by Weston Biscuit Company

The first known cookie sales by an individual Girl Scout unit were by the Mistletoe Troop in Muskogee, Oklahoma, in December 1917 at their local high school. In 1922, the Girl Scout magazine The American Girl suggested cookie sales as a fundraiser and provided a simple sugar cookie recipe from a regional director for the Girl Scouts of Chicago. In 1928, the Girl Scout manual suggested sales of cookies to make a troop self-supporting. In 1933, Girl Scouts in Philadelphia organized the first commercial sale, selling homemade cookies at the windows of the Philadelphia Gas and Electric Company (PGE). In 1934, the first official cookie sale was by the Girl Scout Council, in Philadelphia, contracting with a commercial bakery. From 1933 to 1935, organized cookie sales rose, with troops in Philadelphia and New York City using the cookie-selling model to develop the marketing and sales skills of their local troops. In 1936, Girl Scouts of the USA began licensing commercial bakers to produce cookies, in order to increase availability and reduce lead time, starting with Keebler-Weyl Bakery. Southern Biscuit Company and Burry Biscuit, both later acquired by the Interbake Foods division of George Weston Limited, were added in 1937. One hundred twenty five troops launched cookie sales that first year.

During World War II, the Girl Scouts sold calendars in addition to cookies because of shortages of flour, sugar, and butter. In 1943, there were 48 cookies per box. They also collected fat in cans to aid the war effort and sold war bonds at no profit. In the 1950s, three more cookie recipes were added: "Shortbreads"/"Scot-Teas", "Savannahs" (today called "Peanut Butter Sandwich" in the west of the US or “Do-si-dos” in the east of the US), and "Thin Mints". Six types of cookies were being sold nationwide by 1956. In the 1960s, greater cookie sales occurred due to the Baby Boomer generation entering Girl Scouts. In the 1970s, "Samoas" were added and in 1978, the National Council reduced the number of bakeries providing cookies to four and standardized the packaging and pricing of the cookies.

In the 1990s, the National Council limited the bakeries providing cookies to just ABC Bakers (a division of Interbake Foods) and Little Brownie Bakers (a division of the Keebler Company). In 1998, cookie sale awards were instituted.

The Girl Scouts moved to eliminate trans fat from its cookies in 2005, and started providing nutritional information on the cookie box.

In January 2015, Girl Scouts began to offer customers the ability to purchase cookies using an online portal through a mobile app called "Digital Cookie". The app can only be used by Girl Scouts themselves with parent supervision, and Girl Scouts can share an individual link to their online cookie business with friends and family only. In January 2018, both the number of cookies in a box, and, in some cases, the size of a cookie, was reduced, due to rising costs of ingredients, and rising transportation costs.

In June 2021, about 15 million boxes of cookies remained unsold, due to onset of the COVID-19 pandemic, compared to normal sales of about 200 million boxes.

== Sales ==
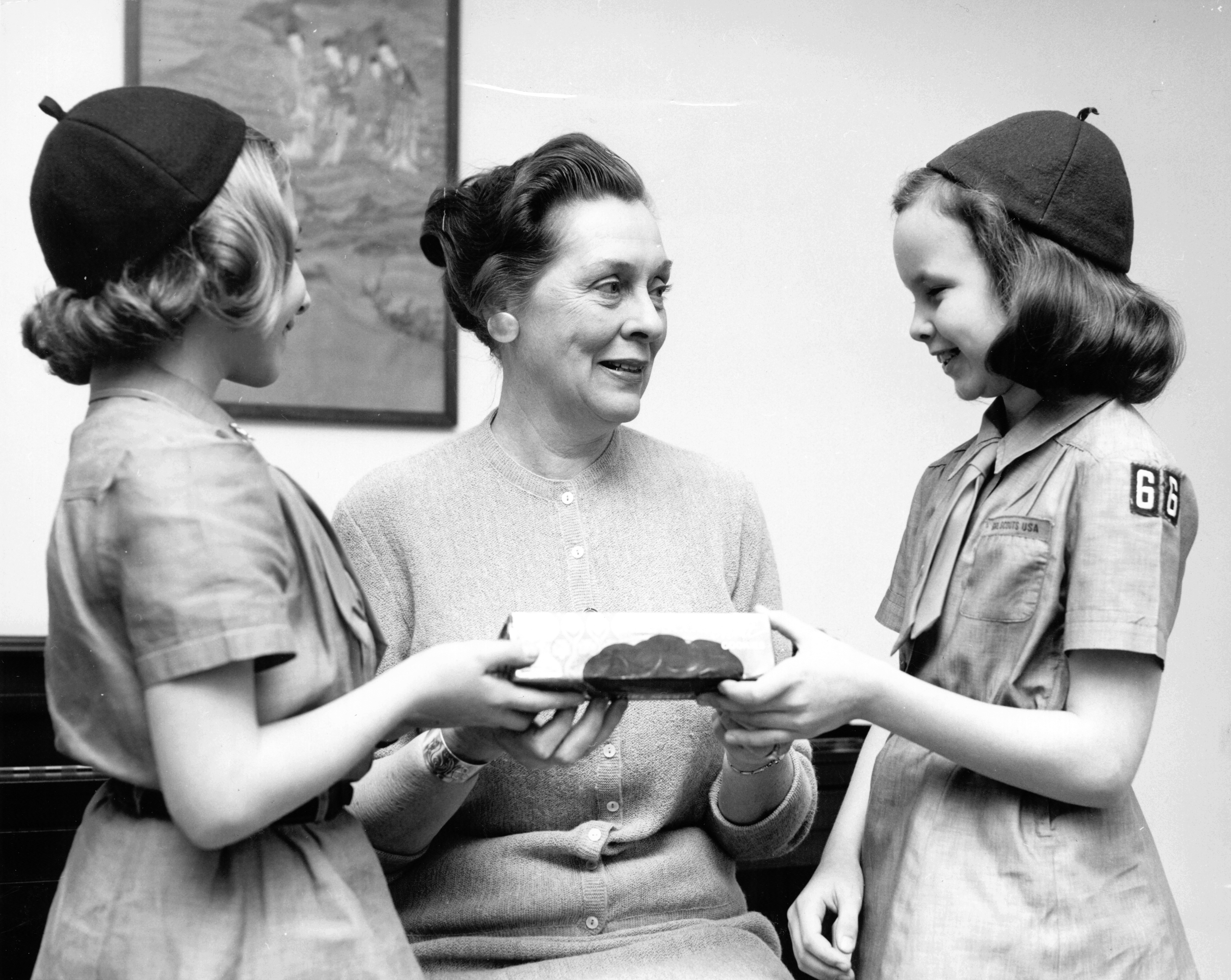
Two Girl Scout Brownies present a box of cookies to a woman in 1963

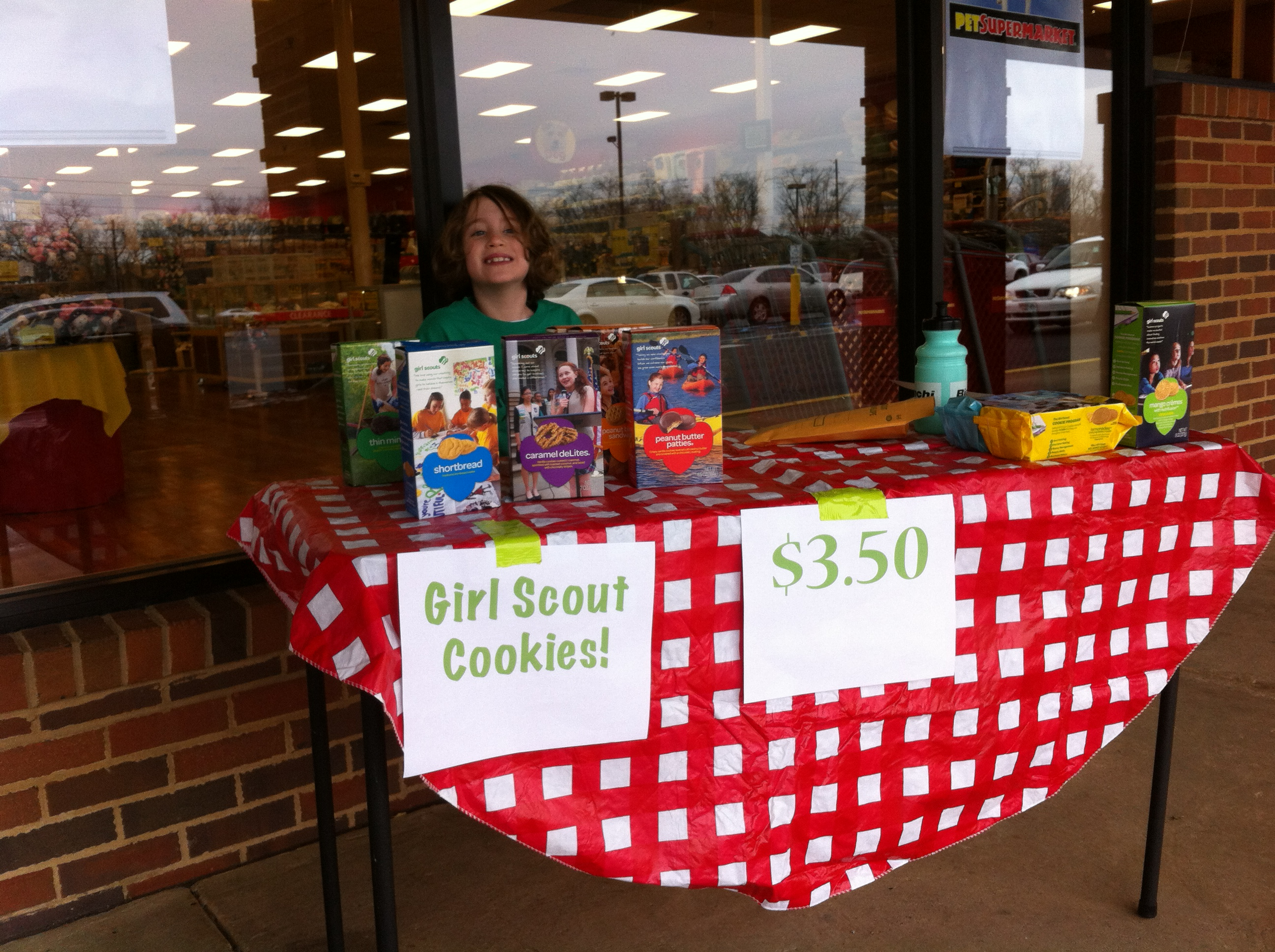
A girl selling Girl Scout cookies in 2013

=== Program ===
Girl Scouts sell cookies to relatives, friends, neighbors, and others in their town or city. Some councils offer the option for customers to sponsor boxes of cookies sent to U.S. servicemen and women. The Girl Scout organization asks that members adhere to strict safety guidelines, including the cookie sale. For example, Girl Scouts, depending on their age, must be accompanied or supervised by an adult when selling Girl Scout Cookies and must always use the buddy system. As of 2015, Girl Scouts can also sell cookies online through the Digital Cookie mobile app. Each Girl Scout council decides which licensed baking company to use for cookie sales in that council, thus determining which varieties are available in the area covered by the council.

=== Benefits and incentives ===
According to the GSUSA, the program is the largest girl-run and girl-led financial literacy program in the world, teaching girls skills like goal setting, decision making, money management, people skills, and business ethics. These skills are reinforced with Girl Scout badges, such as "Cookie CEO".

As an incentive to sell, Girl Scouts are offered recognitions and rewards, such as stuffed animals, trinkets, coupons, or credits toward Girl Scout camp, activities, or uniforms. These recognitions and rewards vary from Girl Scout council to council. The rewards are usually cumulative, so that a girl who earns the reward for selling 50 boxes of cookies will also get the 25- and 20-box items. In some councils, girls may choose to earn more money for their troop instead of recognitions if they are working toward a troop goal such as a trip or other expensive activity. This type of fundraising is intended to teach Girl Scouts valuable entrepreneurial skills such as planning, teamwork, financial literacy, organization, communication, and goal setting.

Award badges also exist for sales, including Count It Up, Talk It Up, Meet My Customers, Give Back, Cookie CEO, Customer Insights, Think Big, Business Plan, Marketing, My Portfolio, P&L, Customer Loyalty and Research and Development.

=== Individual accomplishments ===
Elizabeth Brinton, also known as the "Cookie Queen", sold a record 18,000 boxes of cookies in 1985, and more than 100,000 boxes in her time as a girl scout. She is known for selling cookies to sitting president Ronald Reagan. Her record held for more than twenty-nine years, until Katie Francis, 12, sold 18,107 boxes in 2014. In 2017, Charlotte McCourt, a girl scout from New Jersey, sold over 25,000 boxes of cookies, breaking the record. In 2021, Lilly Bumpus, a childhood cancer survivor, broke the record by selling 32,484 boxes.

== Profits ==
The Girl Scouts say their sale of cookies is the largest annual fundraiser in the world dedicated to girls.

Traditionally each regional Girl Scout council set the prices for cookies sold in that council. A 2006 article in The Boston Globe noted that price "is hardly ever a factor, until buyers find out that the same box of cookies is selling for less in the next town over." The Globe found that a box of Thin Mints sold for $3.50 in Rockland, Massachusetts, and $4.00 in neighboring Norwell.

Each Girl Scout council operates its own cookie sale. Approximately 70% of the proceeds stay in the local Girl Scout council to support Girl Scouting in that area, including a portion, approximately 15%, that goes directly to the group selling the cookies. The profits are divided by a formula, with local troops receiving about 10–15% of the retail price, the council more than 50%, and the manufacturer the remainder. In 1992, Girl Scouts sold 175 million boxes of cookies nationwide. As of 2018, more than 200 million boxes are sold each cookie selling season for $800 million, leaving approximately $600 million in net revenue to the Girl Scouts to be distributed. Revenues at all levels are used to pay for events and activities for the Girl Scouts, maintenance of the councils' Girl Scout camps and other properties, cookie sale incentives, and Council administrative costs.

== Production ==
Girl Scout cookies are made by large national commercial bakeries under license from Girl Scouts of the USA. The bakers licensed by the organization may change from year to year, though this is not common. In 2008 the licensed companies were Little Brownie Bakers (LBB), a subsidiary of Keebler, which is owned by Ferrero SpA; and ABC Bakers, a subsidiary of Interbake Foods, which is owned by George Weston Limited. In 2023, the same two companies were producing all Girl Scout cookies.

=== Varieties ===
Up to 12 varieties of Girl Scout cookies are offered. The same cookies may be sold under different names by different bakeries, with the choice of bakery determining the name. There has been no move to standardize names. The merger of many councils (from 312 to 109) following the August 2006 reorganization resulted in many councils changing bakeries, thus causing some confusion at that time.

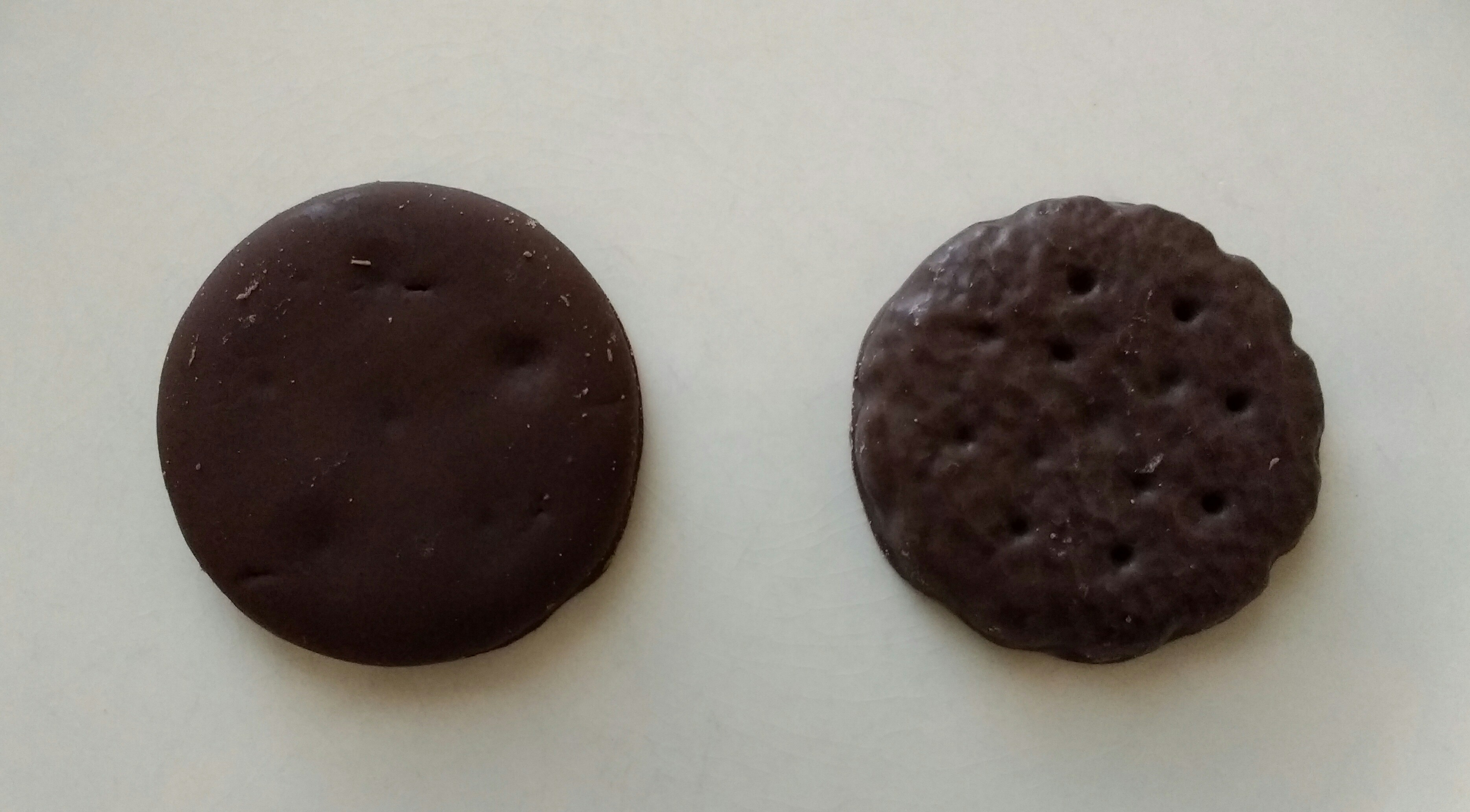
Thin Mints by Little Brownie Bakers (left) and ABC Bakers (right)

Thin Mints are the most popular Girl Scout Cookies. About 50 million boxes of Thin Mints were sold in 2013. Thin Mints average at about 32 cookies per box.

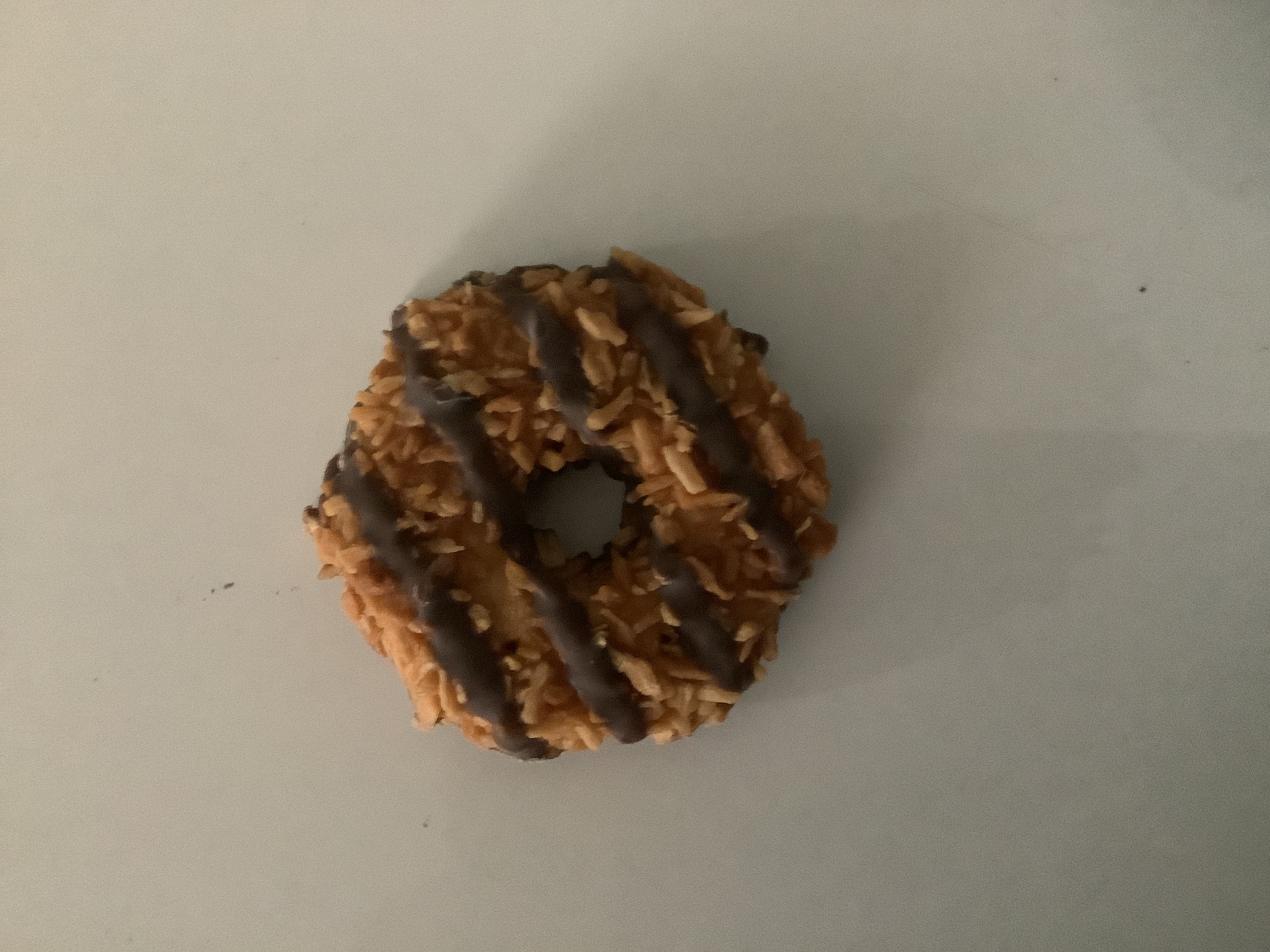
Caramel DeLites cookie

Samoas/Caramel deLites are the second most popular Girl Scout Cookies. About 38 million boxes of Samoas were sold in 2013. Samoas contain about 15 cookies per box.

Girl Scout cookie varieties include:

ABC Bakers (Interbake)	Little Brownie Bakers (Keebler)	Sales	Flavor
Thin Mints	Thin Mints	25%	Thin, peppermint-flavored chocolate wafers dipped in a compound chocolate coating. One of five vegan offered Girl Scout cookies. Keebler makes a similar cookie known as a Fudge Mint Delight (formerly called Grasshoppers), which is produced in the same factory as Little Brownie Bakers's Thin Mints.
Caramel DeLites	Samoas	19%	Vanilla cookies coated in caramel, sprinkled with toasted coconut and laced with compound chocolate stripes. Keebler also sells a similar cookie called Coconut Dreams.
Peanut Butter Sandwiches	Do-si-dos	16%	Peanut butter filling sandwiched between oatmeal cookies.
Peanut Butter Patties	Tagalongs	13%	Vanilla cookies layered with peanut butter and covered with a compound chocolate coating.
Lemonades	Lemon-Ups	9%	ABC: Shortbread cookie with lemon icing.
Lemonades	Lemon-Ups	6%	LBB: Crispy lemon cookies with a layer of glaze on one side, introduced in 2020.
Trefoils	Trefoils	7%	A traditional shortbread cookie made in the shape of the Girl Scout trefoil. The first Girl Scout Cookie made by LBB.
	Toffee-tastic		Gluten-free butter cookies with toffee bits. (Pilot, not offered everywhere until .)
Caramel Chocolate Chip			Gluten-free caramel chocolate chip cookies.
Adventurefuls	Adventurefuls		Indulgent brownie-inspired cookies topped with caramel flavored creme and a hint of sea salt.
Exploremores	Exploremores		Rocky Road ice cream-inspired cookies filled with flavors of chocolate, marshmallow and toasted almond crème.

=== Discontinued varieties ===
- All Abouts (LBB): The LBB version of Thanks-A-Lot. Shortbread cookie dipped in chocolate with a message proclaiming values that Girl Scouts are "all about", such as Respect, Friendship, etc. Sold from 2001 to 2008.
- Aloha Chips (LBB): Included white chocolate chips and macadamia nuts.
- Animal Treasures: Rectangular shortbread with a fudge bottom; cookie stamped with endangered animals. Sold from 1995-2005; replaced by Thanks-A-Lot.
- Apple Cinnamons (LBB): Apple-shaped sugar cookies with cinnamon sugar. Sold from 1997 to 2001.
- Cabana Cremes (LBB): Vanilla creme and lemon creme in a vanilla sandwich. 1989
- Cafe Cookies (LBB): Shortbread with a cinnamon topping; sold from 2005 to 2007.
- Cartwheels(ABC): Oatmeal and cinnamon cookie; sold 2005-2007.
- Chalet Creme Assortment (LBB): Shortbread cookie with embossed chalet picture with two sleeves of cookies, one with lemon-filled and the other with vanilla-filled cookies. Sold from 1990 to 1995.
- Chocolate Chunks (LBB): Old-style chocolate chip recipe. Sold from 1979 to 1981.
- Cinna-Spins (LBB): Cinnamon-flavored cookies shaped like miniature cinnamon rolls that came in 100-calorie packs. Replaced by Daisy Go Rounds.
- Cinnamon Oatmeal Raisin Bar: 1996
- Cranberry Citrus Crisps (ABC): Whole grain cookie with cranberry bits and citrus flavoring.
- Coconut Creams (LBB): Sandwich cookie filled with coconut cream. Box had one row vanilla, one row chocolate; sold in the purple box theme. Sold in Broken Arrow (suburb of Tulsa, Oklahoma) by Girl Scout of the former Magic Empire Council by Little Brownie Bakers from 1981-1983.
- Country Hearth Chocolate Chip (LBB): Low-fat chocolate-chip cookie made with oatmeal. Sold from 1988 to 1990.
- Daisy Go Rounds (ABC): Cinnamon-flavored cookies shaped like daisies; replaced Cinna-spins for the 2009 sale; replaced with Shout Outs! in 2011.
- Double Dutch (LBB): Chocolate cookies with chocolate chips. Sold from 2004 to 2005.
- Dulce de Leche (LBB): Cookies with milk caramel chips and caramel stripe drizzle on top. Sold from 2008 to 2009.
- Dulce de Leche (LBB): Cookies with milk caramel chips (no caramel drizzle). Sold from 2009 to 2014.
- Echo (LBB): Dark chocolate cookies with vanilla filling. Sold from 1987 to 1989.
- Five World Cinnamon (ABC): Savory cinnamon sugar cookies featuring Girl Scouting's Five Worlds of Interest. Sold from 1996 to 2001.
- Forget-Me-Nots (LBB): Granola cookie. Sold from 1979 to 1981.
- Friendship Circles (ABC): "friend" embossed on vanilla cookie sandwich with chocolate filling, in 18 languages
- Golden Nut Clusters (LBB): Caramel pecan cookies with a maple-flavored coating. Sold from 1991 to 1993.
- Golden Yangles (Burry): Triangular cheddar crackers; sold in the 1980s.
- Granola (LBB): Rolled Oat cookies. Sold from 1977 to 1978.
- Hoedowns (Burry): Burry-LU's version of peanut butter patties/Tagalongs.
- Iced Berry Pinatas (ABC): Sugar cookies with a berry jam center and icing.
- Iced Ginger Daisies: Reduced fat cookie
- Juliettes (LBB): Two sleeves of cookies. One sleeve with a daisy shaped shortbread cookie with a lemon-coated bottom, and the second sleeve with a pecan-praline coating on the bottom. Sold from 1984 to 1985.
- Juliettes (LBB): Caramel-pecan cookie with a fudge coating. Sold from 1993-1995.
- Golden Nut Clusters: Milk chocolate, caramel, and pecans. Sold from 1993 to 1996.
- Kookaburras (Burry): Layers of crispy rice wafers and caramel coated in milk chocolate; sold from 1983-1986.
- Le Chips (LBB): Chocolate chip cookies with hazelnut. Sold from 1996 to 1997 by LBB. Replaced by Aloha Chips in 2000.
- Lemon Chalet Cremes: Rectangular cinnamon sandwich cookies with lemon creme filling. Sold from 2007 to 2011; changed to round cookies in 2009; replaced by Savannah Smiles in 2012.
- Lemon Cremes (Burry): Vanilla sandwich cookie with lemon filling; replaced by Cabana Cremes (LBB); sold 1973-1989.
- Lemon Coolers (LBB): Reduced-fat vanilla wafers with lemon zest, dusted with powdered sugar; similar to Savannah Smiles. Sold from 2003 to 2006.
- Lemon Drops (LBB): Sugar cookie with lemon-flavored chips. Sold from 1998 to 1999.
- Little Brownies (LBB): Sugar-free square chocolate cookie. Sold from 2008 to 2009.
- Mango Cremes with NutriFusion (ABC): Vanilla and coconut cookies filled with a tangy mango-flavored creme with nutrients derived from fruits; replaced by Cranberry Citrus Crisps in 2013.
- Medallions (LBB): Introduced for 1983–1984 and celebrating 50 years of Girl Scout Cookies, two flavors: shortbread with cocoa coating on the bottom ("Colonial Shortbread Supremes") pecan shortbread with brown sugar coating ("Southern Pecan Praline").
- Olé Olés (LBB): Powdered-sugar cookies with pecans and coconut; sold from 2001 to 2003.
- Pecan Shortees (LBB): Shortbread cookies with pecans. Sold from 1985 to 1987.
- Pinatas (ABC): Oatmeal cookie with fruit filling and topped with cinnamon and sugar glaze; sold 2003-2005.
- Praline Royale (ABC): Soft vanilla cookie with a praline filling and striped with chocolate; introduced by ABC for the 1992–93 season.
- Rah-Rah Raisins (LBB): Oatmeal cookies with raisins and Greek yogurt-flavored chunks. Sold from 2014 to 2016.
- Raspberry Rally: Thin, crispy cookies infused with raspberry flavor, dipped in chocolatey coating. Introduced and discontinued in 2023. (Online-exclusive with very limited supply.)
- Reduced-Fat Chalet Creme (LBB): 30% less fat lemon creme and vanilla creme sandwich cookies. Sold from 1995 to 1997.
- Savannahs (Burry): A peanut butter sandwich cookie, similar to peanut butter sandwich (ABC) and Do-si-dos (LBB) .
- Savannah Smiles (LBB): Lemony wedges coated with powdered sugar. Sold from 2011 to 2019. Replaced by Lemon-Ups (LBB) in 2020.
- Scot-Teas (Burry): Shortbread cookies with sprinkled sugar. Sold from 1959-1980.
- Shout Outs! (ABC): Belgian-style caramelized cookie. Sold from 2010-2012.
- S'mores (ABC): Graham cracker double dipped in creme icing and finished with a chocolatey coating; discontinued in 2022.
- S'mores (LBB): Crunchy graham sandwich cookies with creamy chocolate and marshmallow filling. Features embossing of the Girl Scout S’mores logo on the front and one of the 5 Girl Choice Outdoor Badges on the back. Sold from 2016 to 2025, replaced by Exploremores in 2026.
- Snaps (LBB): Iced oatmeal raisin. Sold from 1993 to 1997.
- Strawberries & Creme (ABC): Sandwich cookie with a vanilla creme and a strawberry jam; available in mid-1990s.
- Striped Chocolate Chip & Pecan (LBB): Chocolate Chip and Pecan Cookie made with Oatmeal and a chocolate bottom coating. Sold from 1997 to 1999.
- Sugar-Free Chocolate Chip (LBB): Small sugar-free cookies. Sold from 2009 to 2011.
- Sugar-Free Chalet Cremes (LBB): Lemon pastry cream sweetened with aspartame. Sold from 1997 to 1998.
- Sugar-Free Little Brownies (LBB): Brownie-shaped cookies with sugar-free chocolate chips.
- Thanks-A-Lot (ABC): Shortbread cookies dipped in fudge with a thank-you message in different languages, replaced by Toast-Yay in 2021.
- Thank U Berry Munch (LBB): Cookies with cranberries, rice crispies, and white fudge chips. Sold from 2009 to 2014.
- Toast-yay (ABC): French toast-inspired cookies dipped in icing (discontinued after 2025).
- Trail Mix (LBB): Trail mix in a cookie. Sold from 1990 to 1991.
- Trios (ABC): Gluten-free peanut butter oatmeal cookies with chocolate chips. Replaced by Caramel Chocolate Chips.
- Upside Downs (ABC): Oatmeal cookies with frosting on the bottom; discontinued in 1990.
- Vanilla and Chocolate Sandwich Cremes (Burry): Vanilla and chocolate sandwich cookies; sold 1949-1973 and rebranded as Van'Chos in 1974.
- Van'chos: Vanilla and chocolate cremes. These cookies came in an assorted box and were sold from 1974 to 1983.

=== Nutrition ===
Federal guidelines issued in early 2005 called for people to minimize their consumption of trans fat. Concerned parents urged the Girl Scouts to address this and other health concerns about the cookies, suggesting that the cookie program was at odds with the Girl Scouts' healthy living initiative. The Girl Scout organization replied that the cookies were a treat which "shouldn't be a big part of somebody's diet", and said that they are "encouraging" the companies that bake the cookies to find alternative oils.

In 2007, following reformulation of the recipes for a number of varieties, Girl Scouts of the USA announced that all their cookies had less than 0.5 grams of trans fat per serving, allowing them to meet the Food and Drug Administration (FDA) requirements for "zero trans fat" labeling.

High-fructose corn syrup is not used in any of the cookies.

=== Palm oil ===
In September 2011, GSUSA released a new policy on palm oil in Girl Scout cookies to take effect from the 2012–13 cookie season. Amongst the pledges made, GSUSA announced it would purchase GreenPalm certificates to support the sustainable production of palm oil. The certificates offer a premium price to palm oil producers who are operating within the guidelines for social and environmental responsibility set by the Roundtable on Sustainable Palm Oil.

The 2011 policy was formed in response to a prolonged campaign by two Girl Scouts, Madison Vorva and Rhiannon Tomtishen. In 2007, as 11-year-olds, Vorva and Tomtishen earned their Girl Scout Bronze Award by raising awareness of the endangered orangutan and their rapidly diminishing rainforest habitat in Indonesia and Malaysia. When they discovered that the Girl Scout Cookies contained palm oil, an ingredient whose production results in rainforest destruction and human rights abuses, the two girls launched a variety of campaigns in order to convince GSUSA to remove this ingredient from their cookies. Vorva and Tomtishen were awarded the UN Forest Heroes Award in 2011.

== Lawsuit ==
In March 2025, a class-action lawsuit was filed against Girl Scouts, alleging toxic metals and pesticides found present in several popular Girl Scout cookies. Girl Scouts denied these claims. The lawsuit, which did not claim anyone was harmed in consumption of these cookies, cited a flawed, non-peer-reviewed study from advocacy groups Moms Across America and GMO Science, which claimed to have found high levels of aluminum, arsenic, cadmium, lead, and mercury in some cookies.

== See also ==
- Girl Guide Cookies, sold by Girl Guides of Canada
- Trail's End Popcorn, sold by the Boy Scouts of America and Scouts Canada
