= Food of the gods =

The Food of the Gods may refer to:

- Food of the gods (mythology), a substance in Greek mythology
- Food of the gods (plant), a species of Ferula and an Indian spice
- Food of the Gods (book), a non-fiction book by Terence McKenna
- "The Food of the Gods" (short story), a science fiction short story by Arthur C. Clarke
- The Food of the Gods and How It Came to Earth, a British science fiction novel by H.G. Wells
  - The Food of the Gods (film), a 1976 giant monster film loosely based on the Wells novel.
  - Food of the Gods II, the 1976 film's 1989 sequel

== See also ==
- Food for the gods, a Filipino dessert
