= Forest Hero Award =

Award

- Description: Recognises individuals who have devoted their lives to protecting forests
- Presented by: United Nations
- Website: http://www.un.org/esa/forests/forest-heroes/index.html

The United Nations Forest Hero Award was established in 2011, the International Year of Forests, to recognise individuals who have devoted their lives to protecting forests. Awards are given annually to one person in each of five regions: Africa, Asia and the Pacific, Europe, Latin America and the Caribbean, and North America.

== 2011 ==
The 2011 winners were announced at the 2012 UN Forum on Forests in New York. Selected from 90 nominees in 41 countries, the winners were:

- Africa: Paul Nzegha Mzeka, Cameroon
- Asia and the Pacific: Shigeatsu Hatakeyama, Japan
- Europe: Anatoly Lebedev, Russia
- Latin America and the Caribbean: Paulo Adario, Brazil
- North America: Rhiannon Tomtishen and Madison Vorva, USA for their successful campaign to remove palm oil from Girl Scout Cookies

A special award recognised the work of a deceased couple, José Claudio Ribeiro and Maria do Espírito Santo, Brazil.

== 2012 ==
The 2012 winners were:

- Africa: Rose Mukankomeje, Rwanda
- Asia and the Pacific: Preecha Siri, Thailand
- Europe: Hayrettin Karaca, Turkey
- Latin America and the Caribbean: Almir Narayamoga Surui, Brazil
- North America: Ariel Lugo, Puerto Rico

== See also ==
- Champions of the Earth
- Heroes of the Environment
- List of environmental awards
