= Franciscans of Life =

- Fratres Franciscani Vitae
- Abbreviation: FFV
- Formation: 2009
- Founder: Br. Jay, FFV
- Type: Private association of Catholic men
- Legal status: 501(c)3 Public Charity
- Region served: Miami-Dade, Broward, and Monroe Counties (Florida)
- Members: Regular and Extern Brothers
- Official language: English
- Main organ: General chapter
- Parent organization: Catholic Church
- Website: Franciscansoflife.org
- Remarks: Rule of the Brothers and Sisters of Penance of 1221

The Franciscans of Life (Fratres Franciscani Vitae) is a Catholic community in the territory of the Archdiocese of Miami (Miami-Dade, Broward, and Monroe Counties). Founded in 2009 by a professed Franciscan, it is a brotherhood of Catholic laymen consecrated to living the Gospel according to their Constitutions and the Rule of 1221 of the Brothers and Sisters of Penance.

== Origins ==
The FFV is an autonomous outgrowth of the Franciscan family, composed of regular and extern brothers who form one family, as did the first generation Franciscans, who gathered around Saint Francis to follow the Gospel according to the Rule of Penance.

The fraternity combines the monastic life with itinerant preaching of penance and conversion, in obedience and submission to the authentic and timeless Magisterium of the Roman Catholic Church, subject to the Roman Pontiff, always under the guidance and authority of the local Ordinary.

=== Regular Brothers ===
The term “regular”, from the Latin regula, "rule", identifies brothers of common life who are celibate and live the consecrated life in community.

The regular brothers live in a community house, under the guidance of a superior known as guardian. The ideal number of brothers is three per community house, not to exceed five, in order to preserve the spirit of fraternity. They are to own nothing. They rent their home, share their material resources, and work to provide for their material needs as prescribed by Saint Francis in his Testament. When the income is not enough, the brothers beg.

At the current stage of canonical development, the brothers have permission from the ordinary to profess private vows. They profess the Evangelical Counsels and a fourth vow to proclaim the Gospel of life to the voiceless. Upon entering novitiate they receive a new name.

The Constitutions make provision for regular brothers who are called to live as hermits according to the Franciscan tradition.

=== Extern Brothers ===
The extern brothers "live in the secular world, but are not of the world". They are husbands, fathers, and single men wishing to marry. They are full members of the fraternity. They come together with each other and the regular brothers at the weekly family meeting, liturgical functions, prayer, and apostolic activities. The extern brothers do not profess vows, but solemnly promise to live according to the Rule of Penance and the Constitutions for one year at a time.

== Way of Life ==
The Franciscans of Life strive to proclaim the Gospel of life in an intense life of prayer, penance, and poverty, and to atone for those who embrace the culture of death. The brothers freely serve the voiceless, paying special attention to the preborn child and his family, the chronically and terminally ill and their families and caregivers, and the immigrant poor. They propose to do whatever is in their power to work with the Catholic Church to proclaim the Gospel of life and to protect the inalienable right to life of every human being.

In keeping with Franciscan tradition, the fraternity is governed by an elected Superior General who is the servant of all, and to whom the brothers owe loving obedience, respect, and attention as a legitimate successor of St. Francis and as the voice of Christ. Through his example and effort he leads his brothers in the observance of the Rule, Constitutions, and Modus Procedendi, stimulating continuity in the Catholic and Franciscan tradition. The founder of the community is the current superior general, with the motto "Deus eligit stultus" ("God chooses the foolish").

The community chapter is the highest authority to which all the brothers must give submission with good will and trust, including the superior general.

=== Rule ===
The Rule of 1221 is the foundation Rule of the Brothers and Sisters of Penance. Its tenets were the basis of many medieval penitential groups and the life-path of many saints and blessed. It is in no way incompatible with any human culture or historical situation.

Penance is a special characteristic of the Seraphic Father and the legacy that he left to his sons and daughters. The Rule guides the practice of outward and inward acts of penance for the benefit of the brothers and for those who do not do penance. Embraced out of love and with joy, penance is practiced discretely so as not to call unnecessary attention to self and not to make others feel uncomfortable.

=== Constitutions ===
The Constitutions pave the community's living of the Rule of St. Francis in accordance with the foundational charism of the community and the needs of the local Church. They received the blessing of the local ordinary. The brothers are to observe them faithfully.

Rooted in the Capuchin tradition, the Constitutions "look back in order to move forward", including elements such as the Roman Franciscan Breviary in English and Latin, a monthly Day of Prayer, a weekly chapter of faults, the keeping of an individual Culpa notebook, the application of the Discipline, the grand silence after Compline, the sharing of a small dormitory called cella which is reserved to the brothers and is a place of silence, and the total consecration to the Immaculate.

The fraternity is a lay community. Clerics may be admitted with the consent of their ordinary, their number never to exceed ten percent to preserve the lay character of the community. Separate chapters are provided for the extern brothers suitable to their state of life.

By reason of the same vocation the brothers are equal, whether regular or extern, lay or cleric, and regardless of academic achievement. No brother may go by titles such as “Father, Doctor, Master, Professor, Engineer, or Don”, but all are called "brother" without distinction.

=== Modus Procedendi ===
Details on the ways in which the regular brothers are to carry out their daily lives are delineated in the Modus Procedendi, from the Latin "manner of proceeding". A short handbook rooted in the Capuchin traditions, it is a guide to practices, customs and regulations that are not part of the original Rule and Constitutions.

The Modus Procedendi can only be interpreted by the superior general. The external behaviors delineated are rooted in charity towards God and neighbor, aim at avoiding singularization and establishing structure, and ultimately help the brothers acquire internal virtues needed to mirror the perfection of the Gospel.

=== Admission ===
Membership to the Franciscans of Life is limited to Catholic males age 18 and older who are in full communion with the Catholic Church and with the local ordinary, and who firmly submit to the authentic Magisterium of the Church, holding firmly to the one true Faith.

No married man may be admitted as an extern brother without the written consent of his wife. Clerics may be admitted with the consent of their ordinary.

Formation includes the stages of aspirancy (up to six months), postulancy (up to 12 months), and novitiate (one year). The regular brothers make temporary profession for three years, then perpetual profession. The extern brothers bind themselves annually through a promise to follow the Rule and Constitutions.

=== Vows ===
At the current stage of canonical development, the brothers have permission from the ordinary to profess private vows. The regular brothers profess the Evangelical Counsels of obedience, poverty, and celibate chastity. They also profess a fourth vow to freely proclaim the Gospel of life to the voiceless.

The extern brothers bind themselves through an annual promise to observe the spirit of the Evangelical Counsels in accordance with their state of life. The Constitutions provide separate chapters to guide them in this endeavor.

== Ministry ==
The Franciscans of Life are involved in anti-abortion education, street evangelization, days of recollection, pilgrimages, spiritual direction, religious education, and other ministries with a focus on the sanctity of life.

=== Preborn Child ===
The foundational charism of the Franciscans of Life includes ministering to the preborn child and his family. The brothers pay special attention to fathers, by supporting and creating programs and services for them.

==== Project Joseph ====
"Don’t let me catch you talking badly about my Project Joseph dads! These men are good people. No one has shown them that being fathers begins at the moment of conception. And it does not end there! Project Joseph offers them the opportunity to mature and grow as men and as fathers.”

— Director of Project Joseph, Respect Life Congress, 11/7/2015

In joint venture with Respect Life Ministry Archdiocese of Miami, the founder of the Franciscans of Life created "Project Joseph", a Franciscan outreach ministry for fathers in at-risk pregnancies. The program, first of its kind in the nation, offers individual counseling, group education, and material assistance to fathers. "Project Joseph" also shows that the services of the Pregnancy Help Centers are not just for the women, but also for their partners, dispelling the mindset according to which pregnancy is a mother's issue.

The program welcomes fathers from the moment of conception until the child is one year old and it does not discriminate based on religion or marital status. Project Joseph mentors are particularly welcoming of dads who think that they will be in the way and feel that they do not know what to do with the new baby, because of inexperience, difficult life situations, and many other reasons. The outcome of the program often goes beyond developing paternity skills. Dads who had dropped out of school, had legal trouble, and even experienced homelessness, spoke of how their lives changed after attending Project Joseph. Several clients have manifested an interest in becoming Project Joseph mentors after completing the program.

The program consists of three, six-week-long series of classes focusing on what it means to be a father, fetal development, and wise use of time and money, as well as communication skills. Given the Franciscan spirituality of the program, mentors receive initial and ongoing formation from the Franciscans of Life.

Founded in 2009, Project Joseph has evolved into an archdiocesan network of formation and service for men who are in crisis pregnancies, present in all of the Archdiocesan Pregnancy Help Centers. In January 2014 it was extensively featured in the Florida Catholic. In June 2015 the Institute on Religious Life published an article featuring the ministry of the Franciscans of Life in Project Joseph. In October 2014 Project Joseph was assigned its first administrative office, inaugurated in January 2016. In November 2015 the director of Project Joseph spoke at the first Hispanic Respect Life Conference in the Archdiocese of Miami, emphasizing the role model of the project patrons, Saint Joseph, and Saint Maximilian Kolbe, a Franciscan who, while prisoner in Auschwitz, offered his life to save a husband and a father. Catholic organizations from other states and from abroad have reached out to Respect Life Ministry Archdiocese of Miami to start Project Joseph in their dioceses. Project Joseph and Franciscans of Life were featured on several national Catholic media in August and September 2016, including Catholic News Service.

==== University ====
The Franciscans of Life supported the collaboration between the new South Dade Pregnancy Help Center and the Catholic Campus Ministry of Florida International University. In November 2015, they helped organize a groundbreaking university-wide panel presentation titled "The Right to Be Born", on the inviolability of human life, how crisis pregnancies affect men and women, and what the FIU community can do to help. The event was not religious or political, and featured local community leaders along with FIU alumni, students, and staff members. The topics included a medical and philosophical overview of human life from conception to natural death, post-abortion fatherhood, the journey from grief to healing, including men in crisis pregnancies, journey from pro-choice to pro-life, and the work carried out by local Pregnancy Help Centers. The event was extensively featured by FIU Student Media and by the FIU newspaper The Beacon. In Fall 2016, "Panthers for Life", the FIU student chapter of Students for Life, was established at FIU in collaboration with FIU Campus Ministry.

=== Immigrant Poor ===
The Franciscans of Life serve the immigrant poor regardless of their status, reaching out to individuals in need or welcoming their request for assistance. If they cannot alleviate their poverty, they try to alleviate their loneliness and fear, and help them meet their spiritual needs.

In 2015 the fraternity published an online Spanish directory of services for immigrants and refugees in Miami-Dade and Broward. The directory lists resources such as health, public services, public transit, internet access, legal aid, prison ministry, food and clothing, pregnancy help, aid for minors, housing and shelters, and education. In just a few months accesses to the directory rose to hundreds of monthly visits.

=== Elderly and Sick ===
The sick and the elderly have a special place in the way of life of the FFV. The brothers minister to them and provide education to their family members and healthcare providers. While the brothers may not administer a healthcare facility, they work for the creation of education programs on end of life issues that proclaim the moral law.

Brothers who are nurses work in nursing homes and hospices, taking particular care of the dying. Others meet the spiritual needs of the sick by volunteering through nearby parishes to bring them Holy Communion.

=== Other Activities ===
The writings of the Franciscans of Life have been featured locally and abroad. A book on the Gospel of Life from the Franciscan perspective is in progress. The brothers have also been guests at Radio Paz and EWTN Radio programs. The community was featured in August 2016 in an article on the Florida Catholic.

While the regular brothers are only allowed to use technology for education, the apostolate, and care of the sick brothers, the community itself has several social media outlets, including a community blog, a YouTube page, and a Facebook group.

In 2012 the Franciscans of Life supported the Second General Synod of the Archdiocese of Miami participating in the Adult Faith Formation focus team. The team is part of the area of conversion, education, and formation.

== Status ==
=== Canonical Status ===
Founded in 2009 in the territory of the Archdiocese of Miami, the Franciscans of Life are a private association of Catholic men with the support and blessing of the local ordinary to recruit members, establish a formation program, open houses of formation, profess private vows, and freely exercise their ministry in the territory of the Archdiocese. The fraternity is to serve in a special way the unborn children, the chronically and terminally ill, and the immigrant who is poor and feels hopeless. In 2017 the Franciscans of Life were listed in Georgetown University's "Directory of Emerging U.S. Communities of Consecrated Life Since Vatican II".

==== Franciscan Succession ====
The Franciscans of Life is an outgrowth from the Franciscan family, founded by a canonically professed (OFS) Franciscan and former Capuchin friar. Every branch of the Franciscan family is legally autonomous, but all are related through the same spiritual father, St. Francis of Assisi and the observance of one of his four Rules. The Franciscans of Life seek to maintain a fraternal and cooperative relationship with other Franciscans.

=== Civil Status ===
The Franciscans of Life is separately incorporated as a nonprofit corporation under the law of Florida, and so has a separate civil legal existence from the Archdiocese. Franciscans of Life is tax-exempt under IRC section 501(a) and described in section 501(c)(3) as a public charity.
