= Preecha Siri =

Karen Thai conservationist and environmentalist

Preecha Siri (Thai: ปรีชา ศิริ; RTGS: Pricha Siri) is a Karen Thai conservationist and environmentalist who is a community leader and role model for indigenous natural resource management.

In 2013 he was awarded a United Nations Forest Hero Award on behalf of his community for their work pioneering recognition for sustainable indigenous-led forest management in Thailand, including traditional rotational farming, rice farming, beekeeping and tea and bamboo farming methods. With his guidance, his community developed a successful model of ecosystem management generating community funds and building community resilience.

Before being recognised internationally as a hero, he spent 11 years working with his community to protect their ancestral lands from development associated with deforestation and advocating for indigenous peoples human rights. The United Nations said Preecha:

"...is a community leader with a vision for forest management. He is a source of inspiration for his community in revitalizing sustainable forest management systems. He has dedicated his life to demonstrating his belief that protecting nature is protecting a way of life".

Through translators, Siri said he:

"... believes that rights with responsibilities are inseparable when it comes to protecting and promoting sustainable resource management systems and self-sufficient traditional livelihood practices."
