= Burry's =

American food manufacturing company

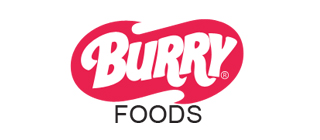
- Founded: 1888 in Elizabeth, New Jersey
- Headquarters: 1750 East Main Street, Suite 260, Saint Charles, IL 60174 U.S.
- Key people: George W. Burry
- Products: Cookies, donuts, bagels, muffins, pizza, croutons, English muffins, artificial sweeteners
- Website: Burry's

Burry's is a food manufacturer, founded as Burry's Biscuit Corporation by George W. Burry in 1888 in Elizabeth, New Jersey. It became a division of the Quaker Oats Company in 1962. The company was one of the manufacturers of Girl Scout cookies from 1936 until 1989.

== History ==
=== Burry's Biscuit Corporation ===
Burry Biscuit dates to 1888, when Christina Burry began manufacturing cookies in Toronto, then restructured by George W. Burry into the Burry Biscuit Corporation in 1933, based in Chicago before moving to Elizabeth, New Jersey. It manufactured Girl Scout Cookies, which it called Plantation cookies. The cookies were packed in a sealed cardboard cylinder, and later the cookies were packed in cans. The company began manufacturing Girl Scout cookies in 1936.

In 1944, Burry's manufactured Girl Scout Cookies including "Thin Mints", a sugared shortbread cookie called "Scot-Teas", and "Savannahs", an oatmeal sandwich cookie with peanut butter filling.

In 1944, the Burry Biscuit expanded into cleaning and hygiene products. As of 1946, the company produced pretzels and pioneered a machine-made pretzel to automate the process.

In 1950, Burry's Biscuit Corporation purchased Independent Biscuits Inc. of Davenport, Iowa for $125,000. Burry's continued to operate Independent Biscuits as a division of Burry's. On March 29, 1954, the company purchased LeRoy Foods, a Brooklyn-based food company. It also purchased Empire Biscuit around the same time. These two purchases doubled Burry's sales. Around 1960 Burry Biscuit purchased Cal-Ray Bakeries, a baking corporation based in the Western United States. In January 1962 the company became a division of Quaker Oats Company, in a takeover valued at around $25,000,000. At the time of purchase, Burry Biscuit had 1,600 employees, profits of around $730,000 on revenue of $22,525,874, and offered over 40 products.

In 1962, Burry's was the largest producer of Girl Scout cookies in the nation. One of their marketing managers, J.R. McAllister Borie, is credited with popularizing the 'Thin Mint Cookie'. In 1980, the food division of Burry's was sold to Générale Biscuit and its name was changed to Burry-Lu, to reflect LU, Générale Biscuit's international brand. In 1985, Burry-Lu and the Salerno-Megowen Biscuit Company were merged, forming General Biscuit Brands. The new company produced 13,000 tons of food, and 30% of Girl Scout cookies. In 1989, ABC Cookie Bakers purchased Burry's Girl Scout cookie division. In 1991, the rest of the company was purchased by Sunshine Biscuits.

=== Burry's Foods ===
The "Gaucho" peanut butter sandwich cookie produced by Burry was the same cookie as the Savannah, produced for the consumer market; Gauchos came in a coarse cardstock box that was covered in a wax-coated paper label. These cookies had a small hole in the oatmeal wafer top that allowed any excess peanut butter filling to escape during production, thereby avoiding the filling being pushed out between the cookie layer sides.

A small retail store offered baked-that-day but broken/defective cookies in bulk for discounts. A shopping-bag-size bag of thin mints cost $1.00.

The Scooter Pie consisted of two large round graham cracker cookies with a thick layer of marshmallow between and coated with chocolate, similar to the Moon Pie or choco pie.

According to Candy and Snack Industry, the company was recognized as an established leader and competitor in the cookie and cracker industry.

They had a diverse list of products. These included Burry's Tart and Entree Shells, Burry's Gourmet Crackers and Cookies, and Famous Euphrates Wafers and Shells, Burry's Vended Cookies and Snacks The company claimed the "secret" of its process was "Slow baking".

== See also ==
- List of bakery companies in the US
- List of baked goods
- List of food companies
