= Rose Mukankomeje =

Rwandan politician, biologist and environmental activist

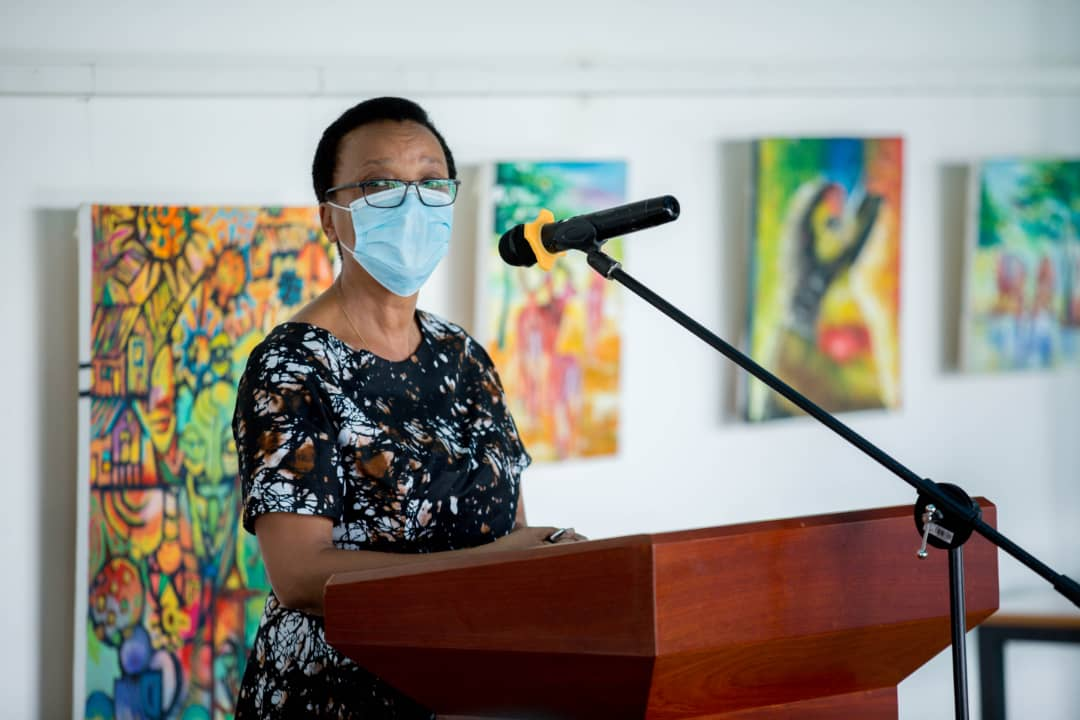
- Born: Rwandan
- Education: PhD in biology in 1992.
- Occupations: Politician, biologist, environmental activist
- Awards: 2013, Mukankomeje received a Forest Hero Award from the United Nations Forum on Forests

Rose Mukankomeje is a Rwandan politician, biologist, and environmentalist, whose work addresses conservation of Rwandan forests.

== Career ==
Mukankomeje served as a member of the Rwandan parliament from 1995 to 2001.

Mukankomeje served as Director General of the Rwandan Environment Management Authority (REMA). Her work led to a 2011 Future Policy Award for Rwanda’s National Forest Policy, which cited Rwanda's "major reversal in the trend of declining forest cover."

In 2013, Mukankomeje received a Forest Hero Award from the United Nations Forum on Forests. The award cited her development of Umuganda, a monthly community-based tree-planting project, her promotion of sustainable agriculture, and her work on a national plastic bag ban.

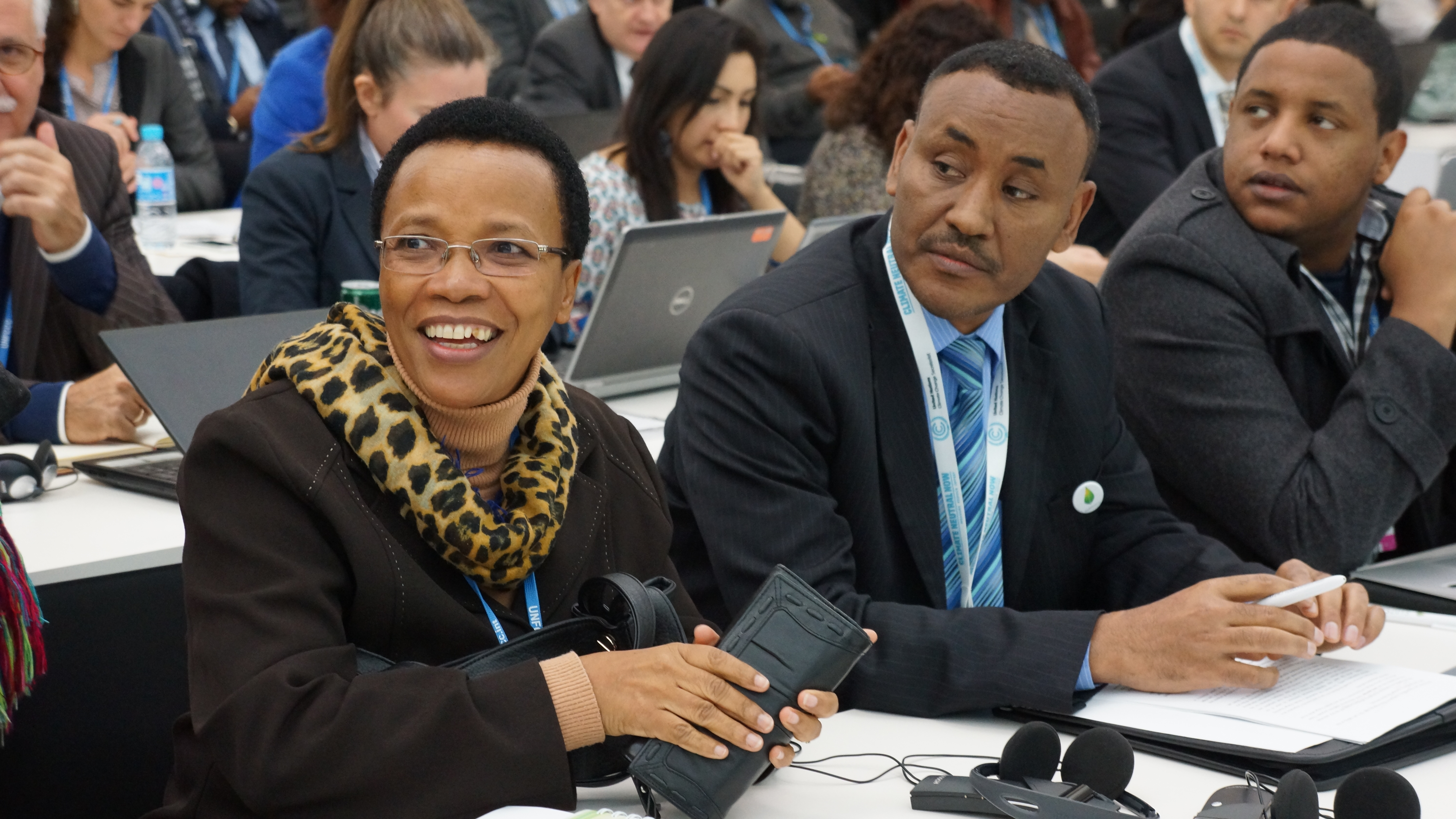
Mukankomeje as part of Rwanda's delegation to Paris Climate Talks (COP21), 2015

In 2019, Mukankomeje was appointed Director General of High Education Council (HEC) in Rwanda.

== Personal life ==
Mukankomeje was studying abroad during the Rwandan genocide, in which her parents and siblings were killed. When she returned to Rwanda, she became a foster parent to 24 children who had lost their families.

Mukankomeje earned a PhD in biology in 1992.

== Selected publications ==
- Mukankomeje, R., F. Laviolette, and J-P. Descy. Régime alimentaire de Tilapia, Oreochromis niloticus, du lac Muhazi (Rwanda). Annales de Limnologie-International Journal of Limnology 30.4 (1994).
- Mukankomeje, R., Plisnier, PD., Descy, JP. et al. Lake Muzahi, Rwanda: limnological features and phytoplankton production. Hydrobiologia 257, 107–120 (1993). https://doi.org/10.1007/BF00005951
- Mukankomeje, R., Micha, J. C., Descy, J. P., & Frank, V. Potential production of an introduced species (Protopterus aethiopicus Heckel, 1871) based on ecosystem Lake Muhazi (Rwanda) modelling. Mededelingen der Zittingen-Koninklijke Academie voor Overzeese Wetenschappen (1996).
