= PantherNOW =

- Type: Monthly student newspaper
- Format: Compact
- Owner: Florida International University
- Editor-in-chief: Jonathan Suarez
- Founded: University-run: 1972; Student-run: 1990 Founding Editor Patrick Hackshaw '90 and Founding Advertising Manager Tracey Green Spiegelman '90
- Headquarters: School of Communication, Architecture and the Arts; University Park, Florida, U.S.
- Circulation: 7,500
- Website: panthernow.com

PantherNOW (formerly The Beacon) is the student-run newspaper of Florida International University in Miami, Florida and has a circulation of 7,500. PantherNOW is published monthly in a compact format during the fall and spring semesters. It is split into four sections, News, reporting mainly on campus and local events, Entertainment, Sports, and Opinion. PantherNOW is available free campus-wide mainly in the residence halls, Graham Center and campus buildings and usually contains a mix of campus, local, national, and international news coverage.

PantherNOW staffers air radio programs on WRGP "The Roar", FIU's student radio station, which is commonly run with PantherNOW.
