= Date square =

Canadian date cookie

Date squares
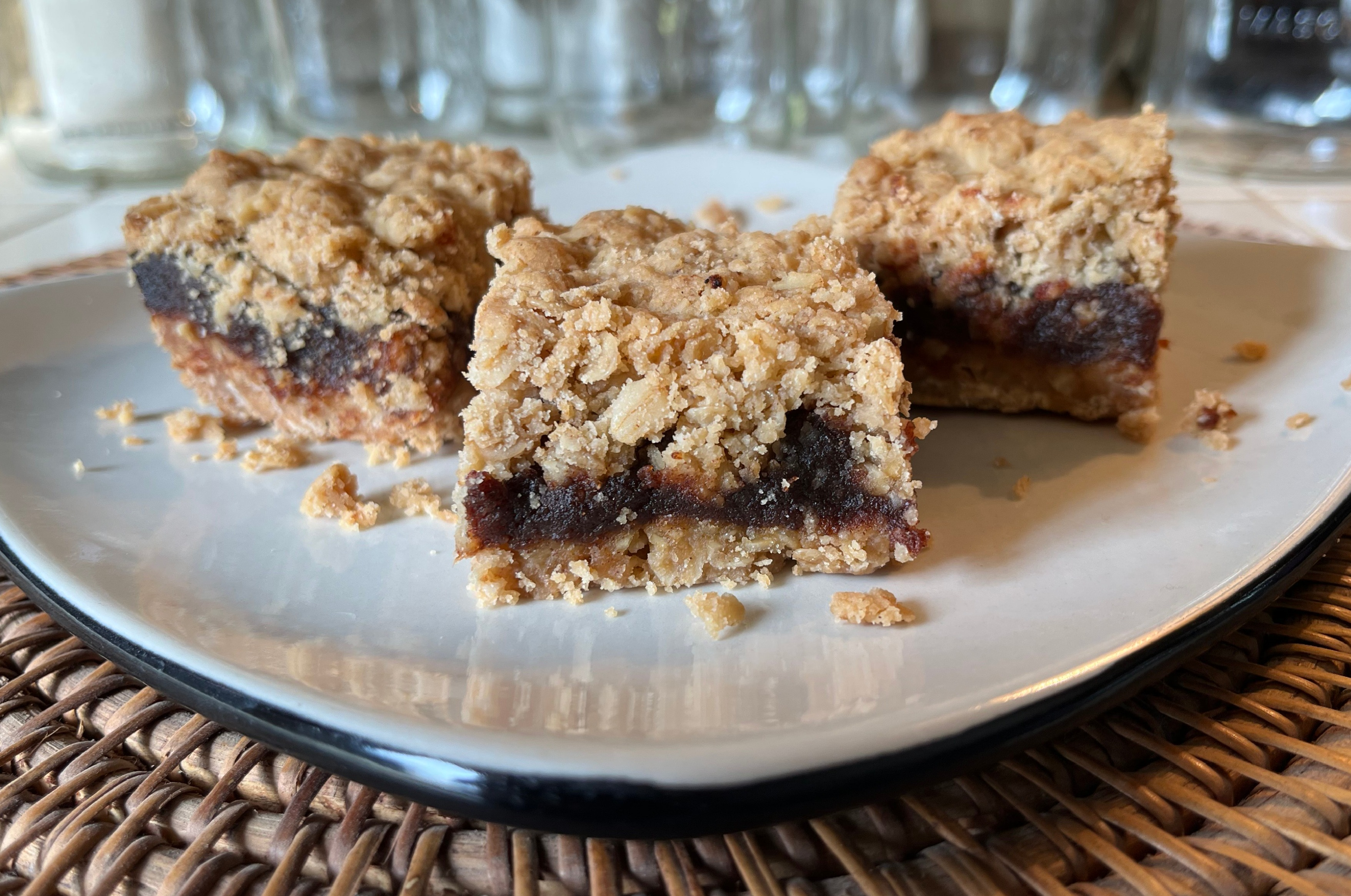
- Alternative names: Matrimonial cake, date crumbles
- Type: Dessert
- Place of origin: Canada
- Main ingredients: Dates, oatmeal
- Variations: Partridgeberry squares

A date square is a Canadian dessert or bar cookie made of cooked dates with an oatmeal crumb topping. In the western provinces it is known as matrimonial cake. In Eastern Canada, it can also be known as date crumbles. It is often found in coffee shops as a sweet snack food. Sometimes nuts are added to the base layer or crumb topping, or other alterations. There can also be candied peel added to the date stuffing for a contrasting texture.

== History ==
The date square is known as a traditional dish of Newfoundland.

== See also ==
- List of desserts
- Canadian cuisine
- List of cakes
