= Date and walnut loaf =

British bread

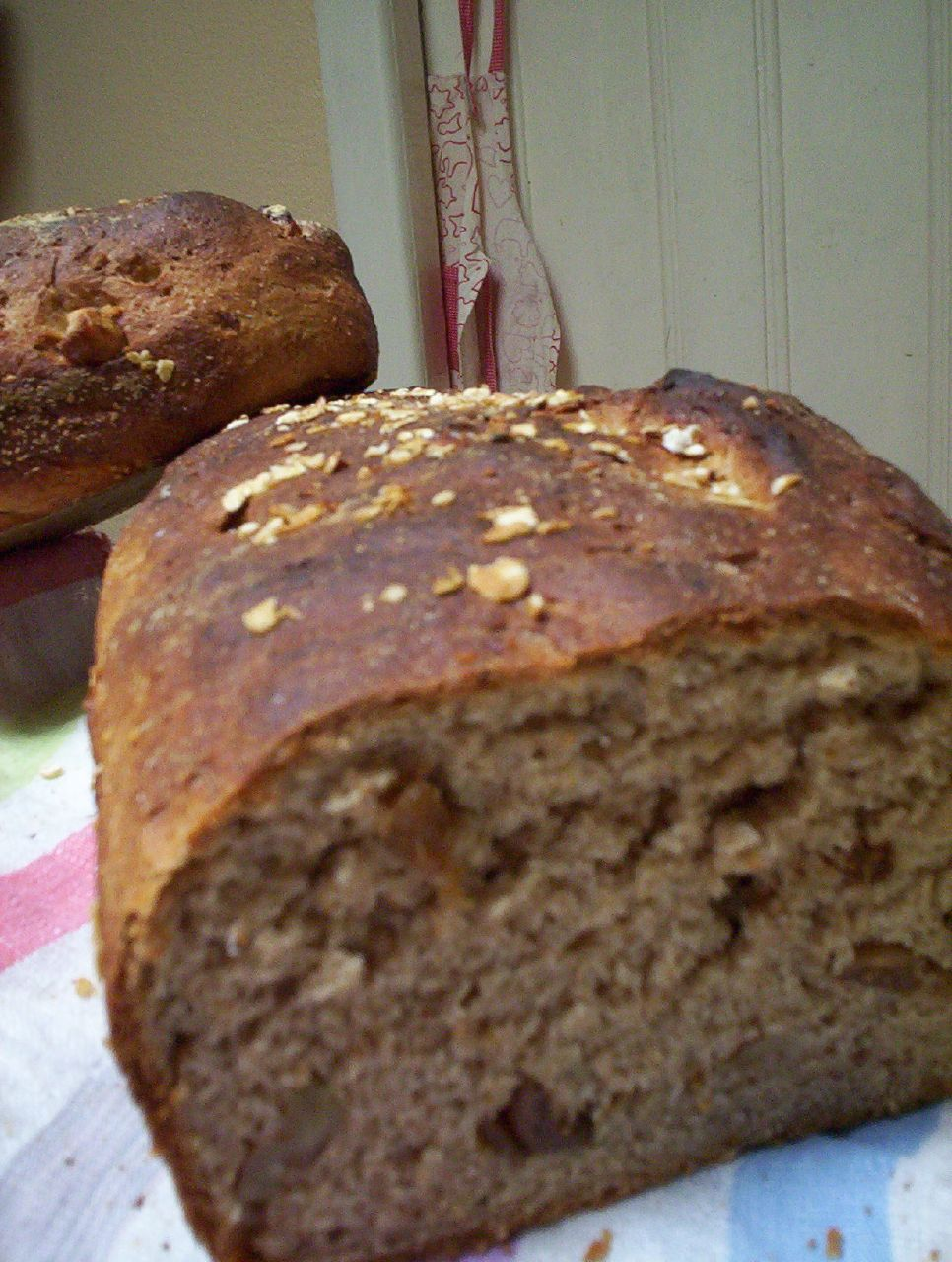
- Place of origin: United Kingdom
- Region or state: Scotland
- Main ingredients: Dates, walnuts, treacle

Date and walnut loaf is a traditional bread eaten in Britain, made using dates and walnuts. It is often made with treacle or tea to give it a dark brown colour.

Traditionally from Scotland, date and walnut loaf remains enjoyed in many tea rooms around the country. It is also enjoyed in cafes, bakeries and tea rooms in Australia, New Zealand and across the Commonwealth. Date bread was first recorded as a recipe in 1939, and is most popular around holidays like Christmas and Thanksgiving.
