= Southern Biscuit Company =

- U.S. National Register of Historic Places
- Virginia Landmarks Register
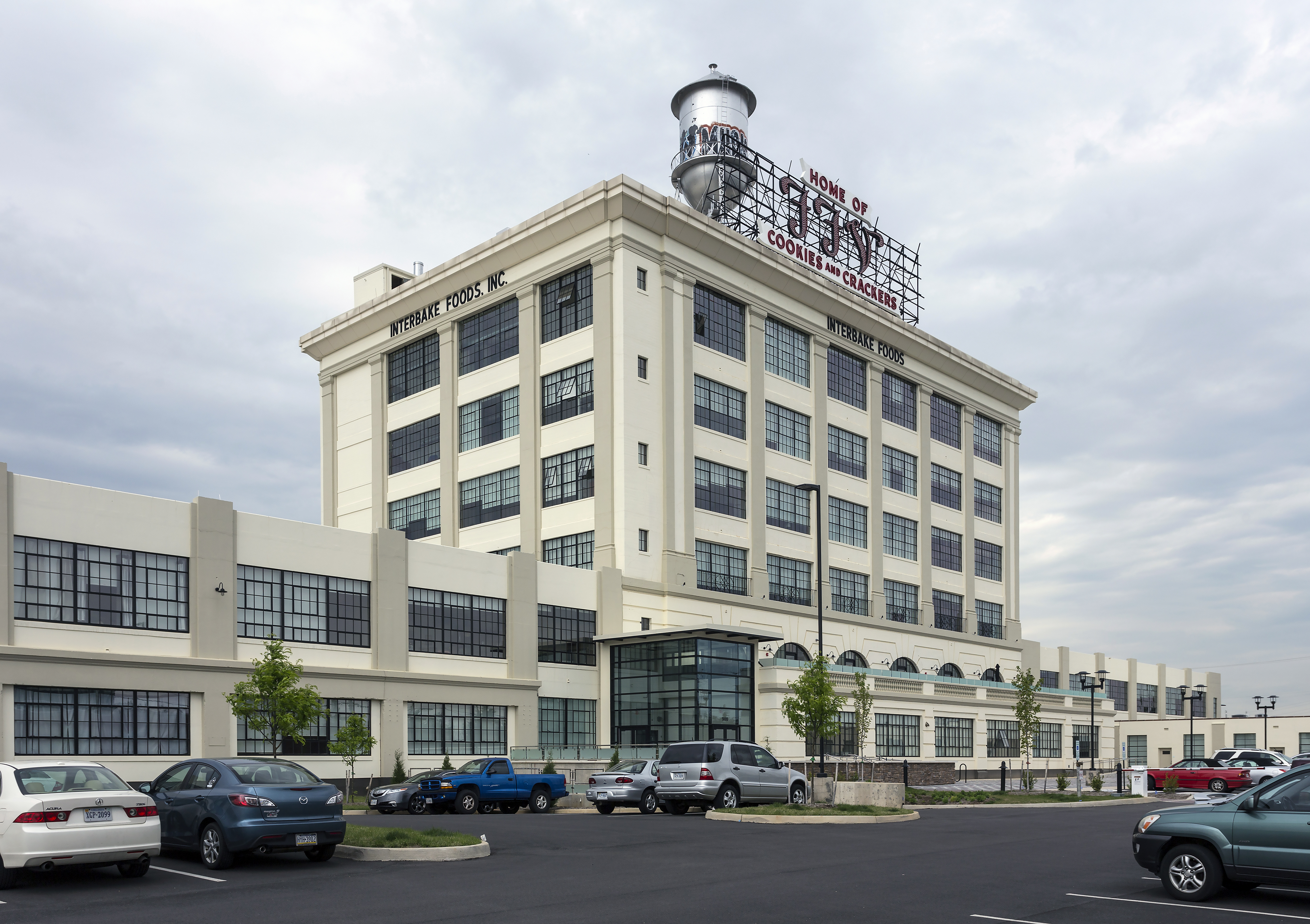
- Southern Biscuit Company post-renovation in 2015

- Location within Virginia Location within the United States
- Location: 900 Terminal Pl., Richmond, Virginia
- Coordinates: 37°33′46″N 77°28′04″W
- Area: 3.295 acres (1.333 ha)
- Built: 1927
- Architect: Francisco & Jacobus, Engineers and Architects
- NRHP reference No.: 12000546
- VLR No.: 127-6165

Significant dates
- Added to NRHP: August 22, 2012
- Designated VLR: June 21, 2012

Southern Biscuit Company, also known as Interbake Foods, Inc. and Famous Foods of Virginia (FFV), is a historic factory building located in Richmond, Virginia. The original section was built in 1927, and is a six-story, reinforced concrete building. It was subsequently expanded four times through 1951. The building features a water tower and distinctive roof-top sign. The sign has three rows of letters spelling "HOME OF", "FFV", and "COOKIES AND CRACKERS". The facility closed in 2006.

A 2014 renovation transformed the factory into a 178-unit apartment building. The Cookie Factory Lofts complex covers 240,000 square feet (22,000 m^{2}) and incorporates unique features of the former bakery.

The Southern Biscuit Company Building was listed on the National Register of Historic Places in 2012.
