= List of biscuits and cookies =

This is a list of notable cookies, crackers (American English) and biscuits (British English). Cookies are typically made with flour, egg, sugar and some type of shortening such as butter or cooking oil and baked into a small, flat shape.

== Cookies ==
Name	Image	Origin	Description
Aachener Printen		Germany (Aachen)	Aachener Printen are a type of Lebkuchen. The term is a protected designation of origin and so all manufacturers can be found in or near Aachen. Printen are made from a variety of ingredients including cinnamon, aniseed, clove, cardamom, coriander, allspice and also ginger.
Abernethy		United Kingdom (Scotland)	Invented by Scottish doctor John Abernethy in the 18th century as a digestive. An adaptation of the plain captain's biscuit or hardtack, with the added ingredients of sugar (for energy) and caraway seeds.
Acıbadem kurabiyesi		Turkey	Traditional Turkish biscuit ("kurabiye") made of almonds, sugar and egg whites.
Afghan biscuit		New Zealand	Traditional New Zealand biscuit and is made from cocoa powder, butter, flour and cornflakes. It is then topped with chocolate icing and half a walnut. The origin of the recipe seems to be New Zealand but the name, while unknown, is likely derived from a 1920s colour description 'Afghan/Afghanistan Brown. The recipe has appeared in many editions of cookbooks sold in New Zealand.
Alfajor		South America, Philippines	Basic form consists of two round sweet biscuits joined with dulce de leche or jam and covered with powdered sugar. In most alfajores, there are two layers of cake and a filling in between.
Amaretti di Saronno		Italy (Saronno)	Italian biscuit similar to macaroons with a bitter ("amaro") aftertaste
Animal cracker		England	Small cracker or cookie baked in a shape of an animal, especially a lion, tiger, bear, or elephant.
Anzac biscuit		Australia; New Zealand	Anzac biscuits are a sweet biscuit made using rolled oats, flour, coconut, sugar, butter, golden syrup, bicarbonate of soda and boiling water. Named after the Australian and New Zealand Army Corps (ANZAC)
Aparon		Philippines	Filipino wafers drizzled with caramelized sugar and optionally, sesame seeds.
Apas		Philippines	Apas are oblong-shaped biscuits that are topped with sugar. Apas is a Tagalog term for wafer. They are a popular part of Filipino cuisine.
Apple cider cookie			A cookie that is prepared and flavored with apple cider.
Baci di dama		Northern Italy	Northern Italian sandwich cookie
Ballokume (from Turkish bal-lokum)		Albania (Elbasan)	Traditional Albanian dessert made of cornflour, butter and vanilla. This dessert is eaten on Spring Day (14 March).
Barquillo		Spain	A crispy rolled or folded wafer pastry originating from Spain. It was spread to Spanish colonies in the Americas and the Philippines, from there entering the cuisines of neighboring Asian countries as "biscuit rolls", "egg rolls", or "love letters".
Barquiron		Philippines	Variant of barquillos filled with polvoron from the Philippines.
Basler Läckerli; Leckerli, Läggerli		Switzerland (Basel)	Swiss traditional hard spice biscuit made of honey, almonds, candied peel and Kirsch. The dough is cut into rectangles while it is still hot and a sugar glaze is then added on top.
Bath Oliver		United Kingdom (Bath, England)	Hard dry biscuit made from flour, butter, yeast and milk and often eaten with cheese. It was invented by Dr William Oliver of Bath, around the year of 1750.
Berger Cookie		Germany	Buttery vanilla wafer topped with thick creamy fudge. The recipe is derived from Germany and are an iconic cultural icon of Baltimore. The recipe was first brought to the US from Germany by George and Henry Berger in 1835.
Berner Haselnusslebkuchen		Switzerland (Bern)	Traditional Christmas cake from Bern in Switzerland, made from ground hazelnuts. It is sometimes confused with another Bernese speciality, Berner Honiglebkuchen, due to its similar appearance.
Berner Honiglebkuchen		Switzerland (Bern)	Traditional Christmas cookies made with honey. It is distinguished from Berner Haselnusslebkuchen as it often has more elaborate sugar decorations.
Biscocho		Philippines	Twice-baked bread from the Philippines with numerous variations.
Biscotti		Italy	A type of hard almond-flavored biscuits traditionally served with vin santo.
Biscuit		Unknown	In the US: small soft leavened bread (scone); In the British Commonwealth: a small and hard, often sweet, baked product with different types of decorations, flavors and toppings. (cookie)
Biscuit roll egg roll (鸡蛋卷), love letters, kueh belandah, crispy biscuit roll, crisp biscuit roll or cookie roll		Spain	Derivative of barquillos. Biscuit snack commonly found in Asia. It is crunchy and can be easily broken into pieces. Made of wheat flour, butter, egg, sugar and vanilla flavor. The traditional Chinese characters (蛋卷) are same for "egg roll".
Bizcochito biscochito		United States (New Mexico)	Crispy butter cookie flavored with anise and cinnamon. It is served during special celebrations, such as wedding receptions, baptisms and religious holidays. It is usually eaten with morning coffee or milk.
Black and white cookie Half-Moon cookie		United States (New York City; Utica, New York)	Iced on one half with vanilla and on the other with chocolate as to resemble a half moon.
Boortsog boorsoq, or bawyrsak		Central Asia	Made by deep-frying small pieces of a flattened dough. Often eaten as a dessert, with sugar, butter, or honey. Mongolians sometimes dip boortsog in tea.
Bourbon biscuit Bourbon cream or Bourbon		United Kingdom (London, England)	Sandwich biscuit consisting of two thin oblong dark chocolate biscuits with a chocolate fondant filling. The biscuit was introduced in 1910, originally under the name "Creola" by the Bermondsey biscuit company in London.
Bredela; Bredele, Bredle or Winachtsbredele		France (Alsace)	Many varieties can include anisbredela (cake with egg white and aniseed) butterbredle, schwowebredle (orange and cinnamon), spritzbredle, small pain d'épices and spice cakes that are made with sugar rather than honey.
Broas		Philippines	Filipino ladyfinger biscuits
Butter cookie		Denmark	Danish cookies consisting of butter, flour and sugar. They are often categorized as a "crisp cookie" due to their texture, which is a result of specific quantities of flour and sugar being used. They are often flavored with vanilla, chocolate and coconut.
Butter pecan		United States	Cookie made with roasted pecans, butter and vanilla flavor
Camachile cookie		Philippines	Filipino ladyfinger cookies that are characteristically shaped like the fruits of the camachile tree (Pithecellobium dulce).
Caramel shortbread Millionaire's Shortbread		Australia	Rectangular shortbread based biscuit that consists of layers of caramel and chocolate. It is commonly known as caramel shortcake, caramel squares, caramel slice, or millionaires' shortbread. The term Millionaire originated in Scotland where it is also popular.
Carrot cake cookie			Prepared with ingredients that provide a flavor and texture similar to carrot cake.
Cat's tongue cookie (langues de chat, kue lidah kucing, lengua de gato)		Europe, Indonesia, Philippines	A sweet and crunchy cookie prepared in the shape of a cat's tongue.
Cavallucci		Italy	Chewy anise biscuit that contains almonds, candied fruits, coriander, flour and uses Tuscan millefiori honey. The version of these cookies sold today is similar to a pastry which was originally served to servants who worked in the stables of rich Italian aristocrats.
Caycay		Philippines	A Filipino crunchy layered cookie coated in syrup (latik) or honey and rolled in coarsely ground toasted peanuts.
Charcoal biscuit		United Kingdom (England)	Biscuit based on a powdered willow charcoal or activated carbon mixed with ordinary flour and made into dough with butter, sugar and eggs. They were originally made to cure stomach trouble and are nowadays eaten with cheeses.
Chinese almond biscuit		China	Small biscuits with no filling by default, with a crunchy texture, but sometimes crumbling on first bite. When they are sold in different countries, they are usually imported from Macau, where it is one of the most popular specialty products.
Chinese walnut cookie		China	Traditionally served at Chinese New Year.
Chocolate biscuit		United Kingdom	One of several types of biscuit not containing chocolate, such as a Digestive biscuit or Shortbread, coated with chocolate on one side or sometimes entirely encased in chocolate. They can be round, rectangular or finger-shaped. These differ from biscuits such as the Bourbon biscuit and the Chocolate chip cookie which contain chocolate in the biscuit itself.
Chocolate chip cookie		United States (Whitman, Massachusetts)	A drop cookie which features chocolate chips as its distinguishing ingredient, also containing flour, shortening, eggs and sugar. Variations include recipes with other types of chocolate or additional ingredients, such as nuts or oatmeal.
Chocolate-coated marshmallow treats Chocolate Teacake		Scotland	Tunnock's teacake is made with a shortbread base topped with marshmallow and coated in chocolate. There are regional variations.
Chocolate crinkle		United States (Saint Paul, Minnesota)	A chocolate cookie covered in white powdered sugar.
Christmas cookies		Europe	Sugar biscuits and cookies from various types of doughs. They all have in common that they are shaped and decorated in a way that has something to do with Christmas and its traditions. See also Gingerbread, Pfeffernüsse, Springerle and sugar cookies.
Cowboy cookies		United States	Drop cookies made with oats, chocolate chips, pecans and coconuts.
Cuchuflís or Cubanitos		Chile, Peru	Variant of barquillos filled with dulce de leche or chocolate from Chile and Peru
Coconut macaroon		Europe	Cookies that consist of a paste of egg whites with coconut that is placed on a wafer and then baked. Its main ingredients are egg whites, sugar and shredded dried coconut. It is closer to a soft cookie than its meringue cousin and is equally as sweet.
Cornish fairings		United Kingdom (Cornwall)	Soft, chewy biscuits flavored with ginger
Coyotas		Mexico	Large flat cookies usually made with brown sugar.
Cream cracker		Ireland	A flat, usually square savoury biscuit often eaten with cheese
Cuccidati		Italy (Sicily)	Fig-stuffed cookie traditionally served around Christmas time
Custard cream		United Kingdom	Vanilla fondant sandwiched between two plain biscuits.
Digestive biscuit		United Kingdom	Semi-sweet biscuit that typically contains coarse brown wheat flour (which gives it its distinctive texture and flavor), sugar, malt extract, vegetable oil, wholemeal, raising agents and salt. Usually consumed for tea. Sometimes sold under the name Hovis biscuit.
Drabbelkoek		Sneek, Netherlands	Crispy and airy cookie made out of wheat flour, butter, milk or buttermilk, cinnamon and sugar. Made by pouring dripping liquid dough into hot butter.
Dutch letter		Netherlands	Typically prepared using flour, eggs and butter or puff pastry as its base and filled with almond paste, dusted with sugar and shaped in an "S" or other letter shape.
Empire biscuit		United Kingdom	Typical Empire Biscuit has a layer of jam in between two biscuits. The top is covered with white water icing, usually decorated with a glace cherry in the centre.
Fig bar / Fig roll		Various	A biscuit filled with fig paste that dates back to ancient Egypt.
Finskepinner		Norway / Sweden	A biscuit characterized by its long shape, almond extract and slivered almonds or pearled sugar on top.
Florentine Biscuit		Italy (Florence)	Chocolate base topped with candied fruit and nuts.
Flour kurabiye (Un kurabiyesi)		Turkey	Butter and flour base topped with an almond or other nuts.
Fortune cookie		Japan	Folded sheet sweet cookie with a "fortune" (an aphorism or a vague prophecy) written on a paper slip inside.
Fudge cookie			A cookie prepared with fudge or that has the flavor, consistency or texture of fudge.
Galletas de bato (Rosquillos)		Philippines	Flat disc-shaped cookies from the Philippines. One of the two notable variants of a Rosquillo.
Galletas de patatas		Philippines	Square shaped biscuits from the Philippines
Galletas del Carmen		Philippines	Crenelated disc-shaped cookies from the Philippines. One of the two notable variants of a Rosquillo.
Galletas pesquera		Philippines	Thin disc-shaped crackers from the Philippines.
Garibaldi biscuit		United Kingdom	Currants sandwiched between two oblong biscuits
Gazelle ankles		Algeria	Crescent shaped cookies made of flour, butter and egg, filled with ground almonds, sugar, cinnamon and orange blossom water. Known as Kaab el Ghazal in Arabic and Cornes de Gazelles in French.
Ghorabiye		Iran	Made of almond flour, sugar, egg white, vanilla, margarine and pistachio.
Ghoriba		Maghreb, Middle East	Made with flour, sugar, butter and often almonds
Gingerbread		Europe	Commonly a soft dough cookie that is made with potassium carbonate and/or baker's ammonia instead of yeast, flavored with ginger and other ingredients such as nuts and succade.
Gingerbread man		Europe	Made of gingerbread and shaped like flat humanoid figures.
Ginger snaps		Europe	Hard twice-baked biscuits that are flavored with powdered ginger, cinnamon, nutmeg and other spices, but predominantly ginger. They are also known as Ginger biscuits, Ginger thins or "Ginger Nuts" (a term popular for them in the United Kingdom). They are called "brunkage" in Danish (literally meaning "brown biscuits"), pepparkakor in Swedish, piparkakut in Finnish, piparkūkas in Latvian, piparkoogid in Estonian and pepperkaker in Norwegian (literally, pepper cookies). They may be rectangular or disc-shaped in shape (when they are called "ginger nuts", they are normally circular in shape).
Hallongrotta		Sweden	Similar to shortbread and are filled most often with raspberry jam.
Hamantash		Jewish (Ashkenazi)	Triangular cookie featured in the holiday of Purim. Shape is associated with the biblical villain Haman and his ears or hat. Fruit, cheese, poppyseed or other sweets are used as a filling.
Jacobina		Philippines	Thick square biscuits from the Philippines
Jammie Dodgers		United Kingdom	Jam sandwiched between two biscuits, with a heart in the middle.
Janhagel	(center top cookie)	Netherlands	Rectangular, brittle cookie, seasoned with cinnamon, covered with granulated sugar and usually almond shavings
Joe Frogger		United States (Massachusetts)	Invented by a former black slave sometime in the late 1700s, but still a popular recipe today. Recipe is a rolled cookie containing molasses, rum, crushed cloves, allspice and cinnamon.
Jodenkoek		Netherlands	Large, flat, round shortbread cookies.
Jumble		England, possible roots in Italy	Cookie-like pastries whose simple recipe comprises nuts, flour, eggs and sugar, with vanilla, anise, or caraway seed used for flavoring.
Kaasstengels		Netherlands and Indonesia	In Indonesia, Kaasstengels usually eaten on Christmas and Lebaran celebrations.
Kahk		Egypt	Small round cookies filled with 'agameya (عجمية, a mixture of honey, nuts and ghee), lokum, nuts, or dates and dusted with powdered sugar. Traditionally eaten on Eid al-Fitr and Easter.
Khapse		Tibet	Simple cookies made of flour, butter, eggs and sugar that come in various shapes with various decorations.
Kiâm-piánn		Taiwan (Penghu)	Taiwanese salty biscuits with crispy texture, made with low-gluten flour, scallions and sesame seed toppings.
Kichel		Eastern Europe	Jewish sweet cracker or cookie commonly made with egg and sugar rolled out flat and cut into large diamond shapes. They are typically eaten with a savory dip or topping.
Kleicha		Iraq, Saudi Arabia	National cookie of Iraq that contains a filling of dried fruit (usually dates) and is flavored with cardamom and sometimes rose water.
Koulourakia		Greece	Butter-based pastry that is traditionally hand-shaped in a ring form, glazed with egg and sprinkled with sesame. It is usually made at Easter to be eaten after Holy Saturday.
Kourabiedes		Greece	Butter cookies (biscuits) that resemble light and airy shortbread, but are typically made with the addition of almonds. They may be flavored with vanilla, rose water, or liquors such as metaxa.
Krumiri		Italy	Made without water from wheat flour, sugar, butter, eggs and vanilla, in the form of a slightly bent, rough-surfaced cylinder.
Krumkake		Norway	Cookie batter is cooked on a special iron.
Kue gapit		Indonesia (Cirebon)	An Indonesian cookie made from Rice flour, Wheat flour, Chicken egg, Coconut water, salt, sugar and cinnamon.
Kue satu		Indonesia	Kue satu or Kue koya is a popular traditional cookie of white-colored sweet mung beans that is crumbled when being bitten.
Ladyfingers		Europe	Light, sweet sponge cakes that are shaped like fingers and are commonly used to prepare desserts such as tiramisu, trifle and charlotte.
Lebkuchen		Germany	Gingerbread with many regional varieties and specialities.
Lincoln biscuit		United Kingdom	Short dough biscuit and a kind of shortcake biscuits. It has a pattern of dots on the top in concentric circles and was brought to America by British expats.
Linga		Philippines	Flat cookies with sesame seeds from the Davao del Sur in the Philippines.
Linzer cookie		Austria	Linzer cookies (German: Linzer Augen, "Linzer eyes") or Linzer tarts are a sandwich cookie version of the Linzertorte, topped with a layer of dough with a characteristic circle shaped cut-out exposing the fruit preserves and dusted with confectioner's sugar.
Ma'amoul		Arab world	Ma'amoul is an ancient Arab filled pastry or cookie made with dates, nuts such as pistachios or walnuts and occasionally almonds, or figs.
Macaroon		Europe	Consists of a paste of egg whites with other ingredients such as almond, hazelnut and/or coconut that is placed on a wafer and then baked.
Macaron		France	A macaron (/ˌmækəˈrɒn/ mak-ə-RON; French: [ma.ka.ʁɔ̃]) is a sweet meringue-based confection made with egg white, icing sugar, granulated sugar, almond meal and food colouring. The macaron is traditionally held to have been introduced in France by the Italian chef of queen Catherine de Medici during the Renaissance. Since the 19th century, a typical Parisian-style macaron is presented with a ganache, buttercream or jam filling sandwiched between two such cookies, akin to a sandwich cookie. The confection is characterized by a smooth squared top, a ruffled circumference—referred to as the "crown" or "foot" (or "pied")—and a flat base. It is mildly moist and easily melts in the mouth. Macarons can be found in a wide variety of flavours that range from traditional (raspberry, chocolate) to unusual (foie gras, matcha).
Malted milk (biscuit)		Uttoxeter, England	First produced by Elkes Biscuits of Uttoxeter (now owned by Fox's Biscuits) in 1924. They are named after their malt flavouring and milk content.
Mamón tostado		Philippines	Twice-baked crunchy sponge cupcakes from the Philippines
Mandelbrot		Eastern Europe	A type of cookie found in Ashkenazi Jewish cuisine.
Maple leaf cream cookie		Canada	Sandwich cookie with a maple-flavored cream filling.
Marie biscuit		United Kingdom	Rich cookie made with wheat flour, sugar, vegetable oil and vanilla flavoring. It is usually eaten for tea and dunked in tea or coffee.
Masa podrida		Philippines	Dry crumbly shortbread cookie from the Philippines made from flour, salt, sugar, shortening and eggs
Milk arrowroot biscuits		Australia	A soft, oval-shaped biscuit that originated in Australia, combining the plain milk biscuit and arrowroot biscuit.
Moravian spice cookies		United States	Very thin cookie that contains various spices and molasses.
Nankhatai		Indian subcontinent	Shortbread biscuits made with wheat and rice flour, and optionally semolina, among other ingredients.
Nice biscuit		United Kingdom	Coconut flavored, this is otherwise a plain biscuit which does not contain cream or jam.
Nocciolini di Canzo		Italy (Canzo, Lombardy)	Small biscuits similar to dry Amaretto, with hazelnut flour. Typical of the town of Canzo.
Oat crisps		Unknown	Small, round and flat baked biscuits made from oat, sugar and butter and sometimes flour with additional flavoring such as ginger and syrup.
Oatmeal raisin		United Kingdom (Scotland)	Oatmeal cookies are the descendants of oat cakes made by the Scots, going back to the time when the Romans attempted to conquer Scotland. Oat cakes first appeared when they began harvesting oats as far back as 1,000 B.C. It isn't known how or when raisins were added to the mix, but raisins and nuts have been used since the Middle Ages. The first recorded oatmeal raisin cookie recipe was written by Fannie Merritt Farmer in 1896 and billed as a "health food".
Otap		Philippines	Oval-shaped puff pastry cookie from the Philippines
Paciencia		Philippines	Filipino meringue eggdrop cookies
Paborita		Philippines	Filipino disc-shaped biscuits with a flaky texture.
Panellets		Spain	Small cakes or cookies in different shapes, mostly round, made mainly of marzipan (almond paste). They are often decorated with pine nuts and varnished in egg white.
Paprenjak		Croatia	Typical Croatian cookie that is known for containing pepper beside sugar syrup or honey, butter, various nuts and other spices.
Party ring		United Kingdom	Commercial circular cookie with a central hole that comes in various colour combinations. Each biscuit is topped with a layer of hard icing with "wiggly" lines in a different colour.
Peanut butter cookie		United States	Features peanut butter as a main ingredient.
Peanut butter blossom cookie		United States	Features peanut butter as a main ingredient and is topped with a piece of chocolate candy.
Petit-Beurre		Nantes, France	A type of butter cookie
Pepernoot		Netherlands	Baked traditionally during Sinterklaas, a feast on December 5
Pignolo		Italy (Sicily)	Moist, soft and chewy cookie that is of a light golden color, made from almond paste and studded with golden pine nuts (also called pignoli). (At the left in the picture.)
Picnic biscuit		Turkey and Romania	A type of biscuit that is small and rectangular.
Piñata cookie			Multicolored hollow cookies that are filled with various candies.
Polvorón		Spain	Very soft shortbread. Crumbles at the first bite
Pineapple tart		Southeast Asia	A shortbread cookie topped or filled with pineapple jam, commonly found in Taiwan and Southeast Asia.
Pizzelle		Italy	Waffle or wafer cookies made from flour, eggs, sugar, butter or vegetable oil, and flavoring (often vanilla, anise, or lemon zest) that can be hard and crisp or soft and chewy depending on the ingredients and method of preparation.
Puto seco		Philippines	A dry powdery cookie made from cornstarch and flour
Putri salju		Indonesia	A kind of Indonesian cookie which is crescent-shaped and coated with powdered sugar covered like snow. In Indonesian language, Putri salju means "snow princess"
Qurabiya		Turkey	Shortbread-like cookies found in the cuisines of the former Ottoman Empire. Versions are found in most Arab, Balkan and Ottoman cuisines, with various different forms and recipes.
Rainbow cookie		United States	Small cake with layers of almond-based sponge cake in different colours, apricot and/or raspberry jam and a chocolate coating. A variation resembles the Italian flag and is called Italian Flag Cookie.
Reshteh khoshkar		Iran	Made of rice, flour, sugar, walnut, cardamom, cinnamon, ginger and spice that is slowly fried in hot oil or fat.
Ricciarelli		Italy (Siena)	Flavored with ground almonds and topped with icing sugar.
Rich tea		United Kingdom	Sweet biscuit whose ingredients generally include wheat flour, sugar, vegetable oil and malt extract. Due to its consistency it is ideal for being dunked into coffee or tea and is therefore usually consumed with tea (see Dunking (biscuit)).
Rosca or biscocho de rosca		Philippines	or biscocho de rosca. Philippine cookies shaped like an elbow
Rosette		Scandinavia	Thin, deep-fried wafers
Rosquillo		Philippines	Philippine cookies made from flour, eggs, shortening, sugar and baking powder.
Rum ball		Unknown	Ground biscuits with rum and binders like chocolate
Russian tea cake		Russia	Jumble-like pastry that generally consists entirely of ground nuts, flour and water or, more commonly, butter. After baking, it is coated in powdered sugar while still hot, then again once the cookie has cooled.
Sablé		France (Sablé-sur-Sarthe)	A popular round shortbread cookie named because of its crumbly and fine texture ("Sablé" means "sandy" in French). Generally, the baker begins the process by rubbing cold butter into flour and sugar to form particles of dough until the texture resembles that of breadcrumbs or sand.
Sandie		United States	A type of sugar cookie or shortbread cookie. Pecans are often used as a main ingredient, and may be crushed and included in the batter, or else placed atop the cookie whole.
Semprong		Indonesia	Semprong, kue semprong, Sapit, Sepit, Kue belanda or Kapit is a traditional wafer snack (Kue or kuih) made by clasping egg batter using an iron mold.
Shortbread		United Kingdom (Scotland)	Very rich unleavened biscuit that is made from one part white sugar, two parts butter and three parts flour. It is available in different shapes and flavors (e.g. lemon flavor). See List of shortbread biscuits and cookies for a list of varieties.
Silvana		Philippines	A frozen cookie made from a layer of buttercream sandwiched between two cashew-meringue wafers coated with cookie crumbs
Snickerdoodle		United States (New England)	Sugar cookie made with butter or oil, sugar and flour rolled in cinnamon sugar. Most distinctive feature is the cracked surface that can be crisp or soft depending on preparation.
Speculaas		Netherlands; Belgium; Germany	Very flat Christmas shortcrust biscuit that contains typical Christmas spices such as cinnamon, nutmeg, white pepper, cardamom, ginger and cloves.
Speculoos		Belgium	A biscuit made from wheat flour, candy syrup, fat and sometimes cinnamon. In Europe, Lotus Speculoos (branded as Lotus Biscoff in the United States and the United Kingdom) is the most recognized brand.
Springerle		Germany	Very hard anise cookie made from eggs, flour and sugar with an embossed design that is impressed before baking. It is a typical treat for Christmas.
Spritzgebäck		Germany	Christmas cookies that consist of a shortcrust pastry that is squirted onto the baking sheet in various shapes and then baked. The finished product is very fragile, crisp, dry and buttery and is sometimes partly coated with chocolate.
Square cookie		Taiwan (Chiayi)	Traditional Taiwanese cookie, originating from Chiayi County.
Stroopwafel		Netherlands	Waffle cookie made from two thin layers of baked batter with a caramel-like syrup filling in the middle.
Sugar cookie		Europe	Very simple cookie made from sugar, flour, butter, eggs, vanilla and either baking powder or baking soda. They are often glazed with icing and decorated with chocolate or sprinkles and may be themed according to season (e.g. Halloween cookies or Christmas cookies).
Tahini cookie		Arab world	The traditional way to cook tahini cookies is to mix the flour, sugar and butter until there is crumbly mixture and then add the raw tahini and continuing to mix. Shap into round, flat cookies and add cookie almonds or pine nuts and then cook.
Tareco		Brazil	Little tough disk-shaped biscuit that is made of wheat flour, eggs and sugar.
Teiglach		Lithuania	Small, knotted Jewish pastries boiled in a honeyed syrup and often filled with nuts or raisins and topped with shredded coconut.
Tirggel		Switzerland	Very thin, hard and sweet Christmas biscuits that are made from flour and honey
Toruń gingerbread		Poland	Polish gingerbread that can be filled and is often glazed with chocolate or icing depending on variety
Ugoy-ugoy		Philippines	Filipino rectangular layered biscuits coated in granulated sugar
Uraró		Philippines	Filipino cookies made from arrowroot flour.
Vanillekipferl		Austria	Small, crescent shaped biscuits that are made from a pastry that contains hazelnut and/or almonds and vanilla sugar and are rolled in vanilla sugar after baking
Wafer		Unknown	Crisp, often sweet, very thin, flat and dry biscuit, often used to decorate ice cream. Wafers can be made into cookies with cream flavoring sandwiched between them.
Wibele		Germany (Langenburg)	Small, sweet biscuits made from egg white, icing sugar, flour and vanilla sugar.
Zaleti		Italy (Veneto)	Small, yellow and oblong cornmeal biscuits made with milk, raisins and rum. They are often eaten after being dipped in a sweet wine.

=== Unsorted ===
- Almond biscuit
- Cookie sandwich
- Hadji bada
- Icebox cookies
- Stuffed cookie

== See also ==
- List of baked goods
- List of candies
- List of crackers
- List of desserts
- List of pastries
- List of shortbread biscuits and cookies
