= Nocciolini =

Nocciolini may refer to:

- Nocciolini di Canzo, sweet crumbly small cookies from Canzo, Italy
- Nocciolini di Chivasso, round biscuits from Chivasso, Italy
- Manuel Nocciolini (born 1989), Italian footballer
