= Half-moon cookie =

Half-moon cookie could mean:

- Half-moon cookie (Philippines), a crescent-shaped cookie from the Philippines
- Black and white cookie, a cookie frosted half with vanilla and half with chocolate frosting, found in New York City and Central New York

== See also ==
- List of cookies
