= Piñata cookie =

Sugar cookie with candy fillings

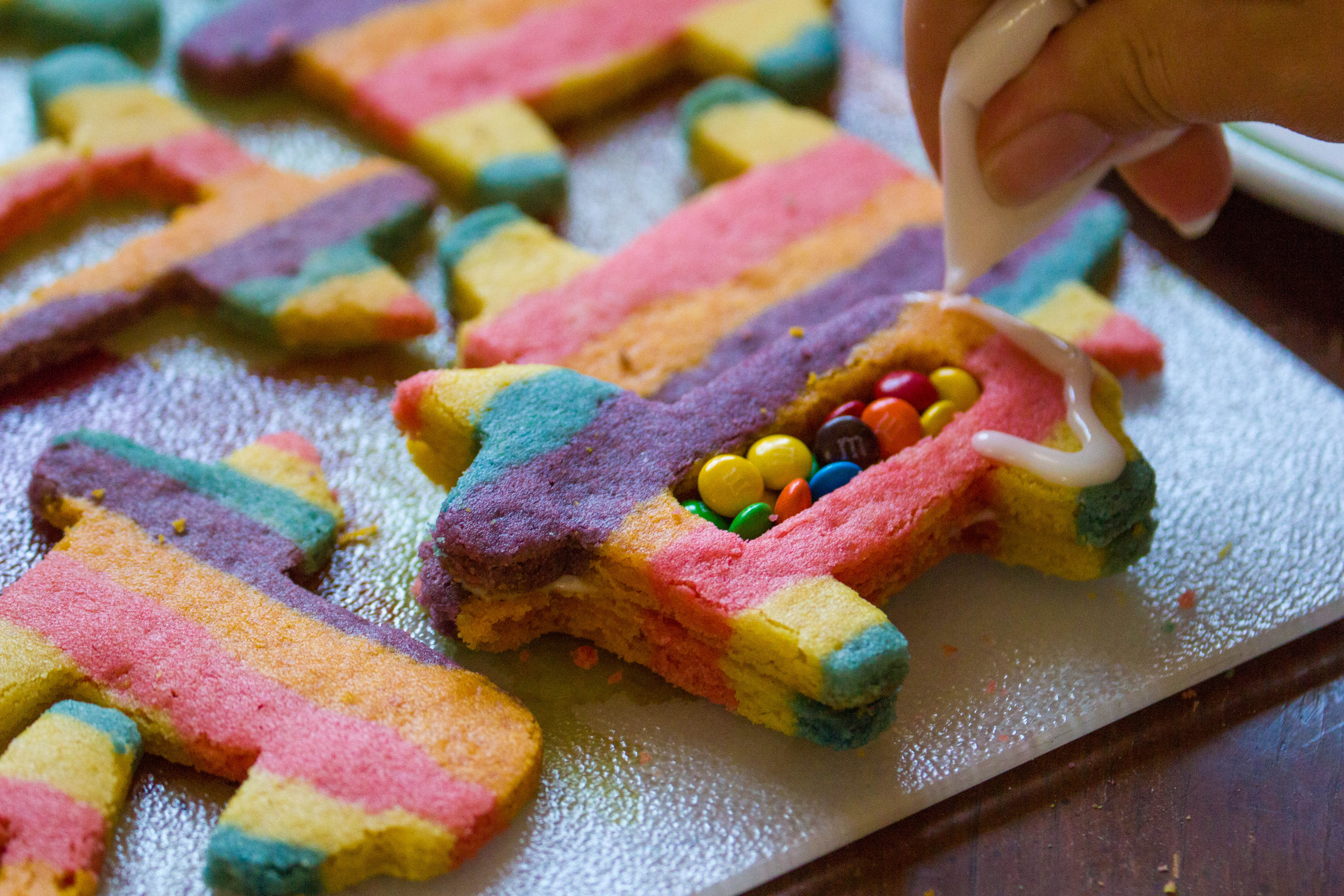
A Piñata cookie being assembled

A piñata cookie is a sugar cookie that is shaped and colored like a piñata and filled with various small candies which spill out when the cookie is broken. Piñata cookies may be multicolored, which involves preparing separate batches of cookie dough and dyeing them different colors. The dough is then layered into a loaf with the various colors being separated A cookie cutter may be used to create various shapes. After the cookies are baked, they are further prepared by creating a hollow pocket, inside which the fillings are placed. They may be filled with candies, such as miniature M&Ms candy, chocolate buttons, or other ingredients. They are then sealed using frosting.

Piñata cookies are sometimes prepared for Cinco de Mayo.

Common ingredients in the dough's preparation include flour, vegetable oil, butter, sugar, powdered sugar, eggs, vanilla, salt, food coloring and baking soda.

The piñata cookie was invented by Sandra Denneler in 2011, with the recipe going viral online the next year.

== Similar desserts ==
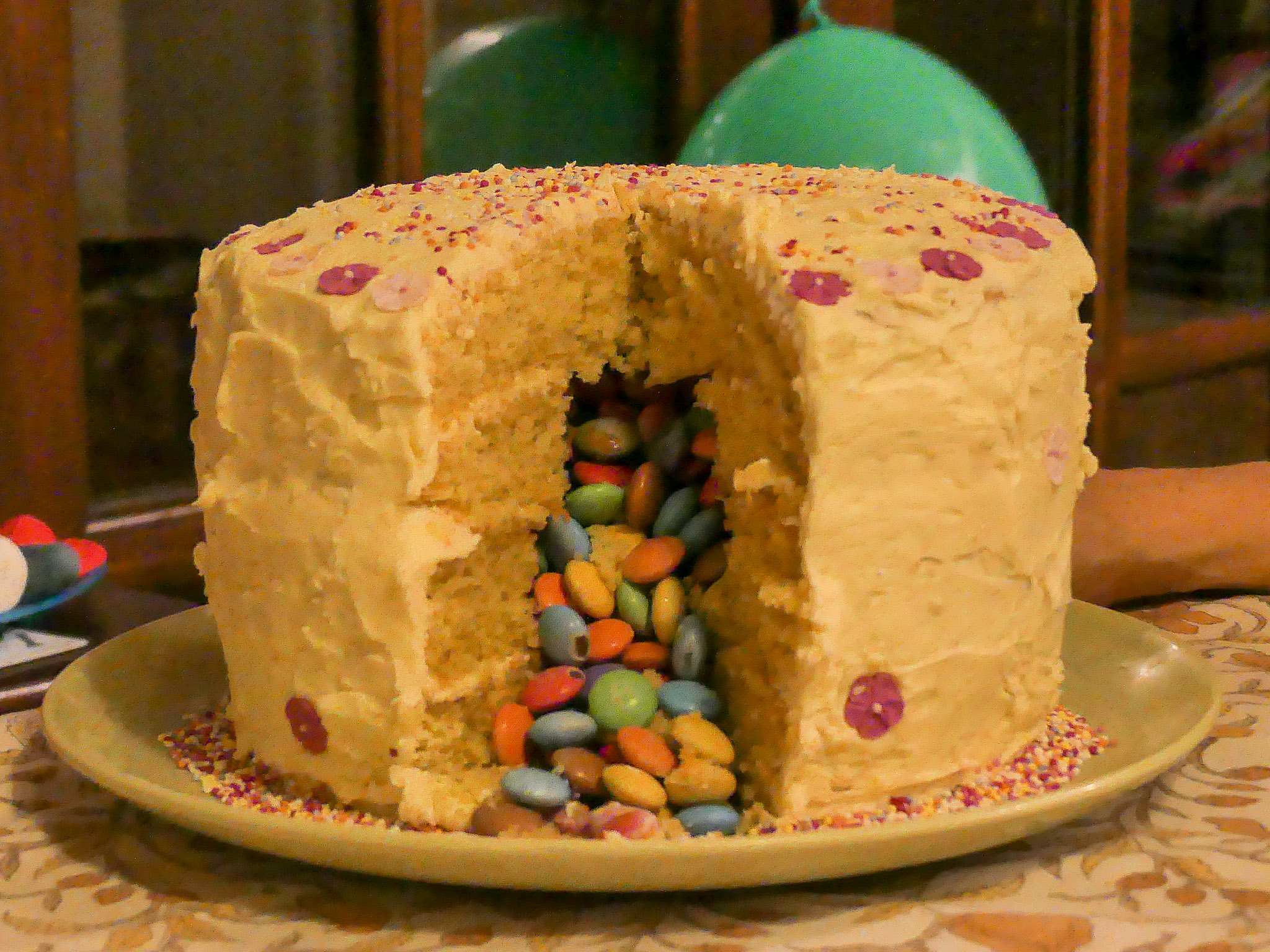
In a piñata cake, a layer cake has a hidden center area that is filled with loose candy before the cake is decorated.

Similar desserts with a piñata-style filling include cakes, cupcakes and ice cream cones.

== See also ==
- Cookie decorating
- List of cookies
