= Malacrianza =

- Film poster
- Directed by: Arturo Menéndez
- Written by: Arturo Menéndez
- Starring: Salvador Solis; Karla Valencia
- Cinematography: Francisco Moreno
- Edited by: Federico Krill; Emilio Santoyo; David Torres
- Music by: Adhesivo; Akumal; Cartas a Felice; Amando Lopez; Pescozada
- Production companies: Itaca Films; Meridiano 89; Sivela Pictures; Unos Cuantos Perros
- Release date: October 4, 2014
- Countries: El Salvador; Canada
- Language: Spanish

Malacrianza, also known as The Crow's Nest, is a Salvadoran/Canadian film written and directed by Arturo Menéndez. The film tells the story of a lowly piñata vendor from a small town in El Salvador and the struggles that befall him after an extortion letter is left on his doorstep.

Malacrianza is the first fiction film from El Salvador since 1969 which has also had the first worldwide release. It is also the first film of the Salvadoran Cinematic Universe, a shared universe of salvadoran drama films. The film was released on October 4, 2014 at the AFI Silver Latin American Film Festival.

== Plot ==
Don Cleo is a humble piñata vendor from a small town in El Salvador who receives an extortion letter at his doorstep. The letter instructs him to deliver $500 in 72 hours or he will be killed. The amount seems near impossible for the seemingly destitute Don Cleo, as he navigates through his reality, neighborhood, relationships and the few aspirations he still has.

Don Cleo exhausts every opportunity to raise the money, gathering as much as possible from friends and acquaintances. Yet, as much as he tries, Don Cleo finds himself in more trouble than when he started. With no other hope to survive, Don Cleo decides to face his fears and stands up to his transgressors.

== Production ==
The film was shot on location in El Salvador. Many scenes from the film were shot in gangster-dominated areas, and reflect the violence that the director saw in his own life. The script was based on a collection of real stories collected by Arturo Menéndez.

== Cast ==
- Salvador Solis – Don Cleo
- Karla Valencia – Araceli
- Demetrio Aguilar
- Rodrigo Calderon
- Gerardo Chinchilla
- Emis Cruz
- Herbert de Paz
- Mercy Flores
- Guillermo Menendez
- Brenda Samour
- Marcela Santamaria
- Leandro Sánchez
- Milton Torres
- Hector Vides
- Giancarlo Villeda
