= Janhagel =

Old-fashioned Dutch cookie

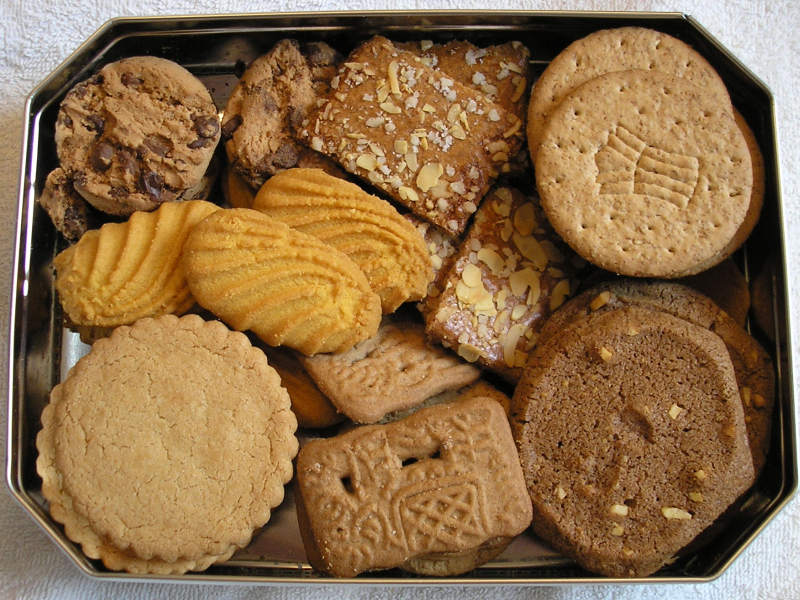
- Janhagels (center-top) in a cookie tin
- Alternative names: Jan Hagel, stroopjanhagel, strontjanhagel
- Type: Cookie
- Place of origin: Netherlands
- Main ingredients: Sugar confectionery, almond shavings, cinnamon

Janhagel or Jan Hagel is a typical Dutch cookie. It is a rectangular, brittle cookie, seasoned with cinnamon, covered with granulated sugar (the hagel) and usually almond shavings. It's an old Dutch specialty. The first recipes for Janhagel date back to the 18th century, and the cookies remain popular in the country to this day.

== Characteristics ==
Janhagels are made with wheat flour, brown sugar, butter, cinnamon and eggs. Some versions of the recipe use speculaas to season the dough, instead of using only cinnamon. The cookie dough is covered with a layer of flaked almonds and sugar sprinkles, which give the recipe its characteristic appearance.

Records from the 18th century in Amersfoort mention a cookie called stroopjanhagel, which had honey and/or syrup in its composition. At the same time, in Krimpenerwaard, cookies known as strontjanhagel were baked by farmers and served with coffee after the annual spring cleaning of their stables. The unique taste makes Jan Hagel similar to Nougat.

== Nomenclature ==
The name janhagel is a generic term used in Dutch to describe a common, simple-minded person. The word probably comes from the expression "de hagel sla hem" (the granite hit him), used as a curse; it is believed that the cookies are named after the sugar crystals in their coating, which resemble granite ("hegel"). During World War II, members of the National Socialist Movement in the Netherlands (NSB) who participated in the paramilitary group Nederlandse Landwachter were called Jan Hagel because of the rifles they carried. The Dutch word for the type of weapon used by NSB members is hagelgeweer.

== See also ==
- List of cookies
