= Moravian spice cookies =

Traditional kind of cookie

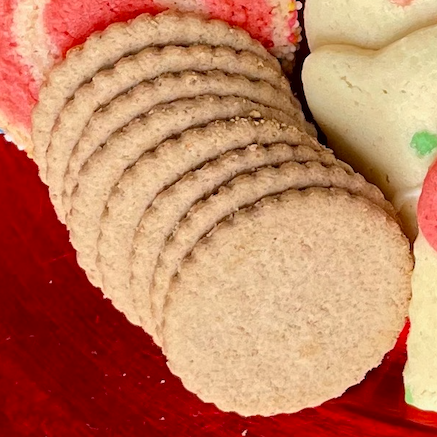
- Several apple-flavored Moravian spice cookies
- Type: Cookie
- Place of origin: United States
- Main ingredients: Spices, molasses

Moravian spice cookies are a traditional kind of cookie that originated in the Colonial American communities of the Moravian Church. The blend of spices and molasses, rolled paper thin, has a reputation as the "World's Thinnest Cookie". They are related to German Lebkuchen; original recipes can be traced back to the 17th century.

The cookie is especially popular around, and usually associated with, Christmas in communities with a strong Moravian background such as Winston-Salem, North Carolina, and Bethlehem, Pennsylvania, which still maintain the two largest Moravian communities in the United States. Although there are a few bakeries that still roll and cut the cookies by hand, some now use a mechanized process for making the cookies in order to meet the demand. While this does not affect the taste, the machine-made cookies have been criticized for not being as thin as their handmade counterparts.

While the spice recipe is the most traditional and well-known of the Moravian cookies, other versions have appeared over the years, including sugar, lemon, black walnut, and chocolate varieties.

In 2026, the Moravian cookie was adopted as the state cookie of North Carolina.
