= Coyotas =

Mexican cookie

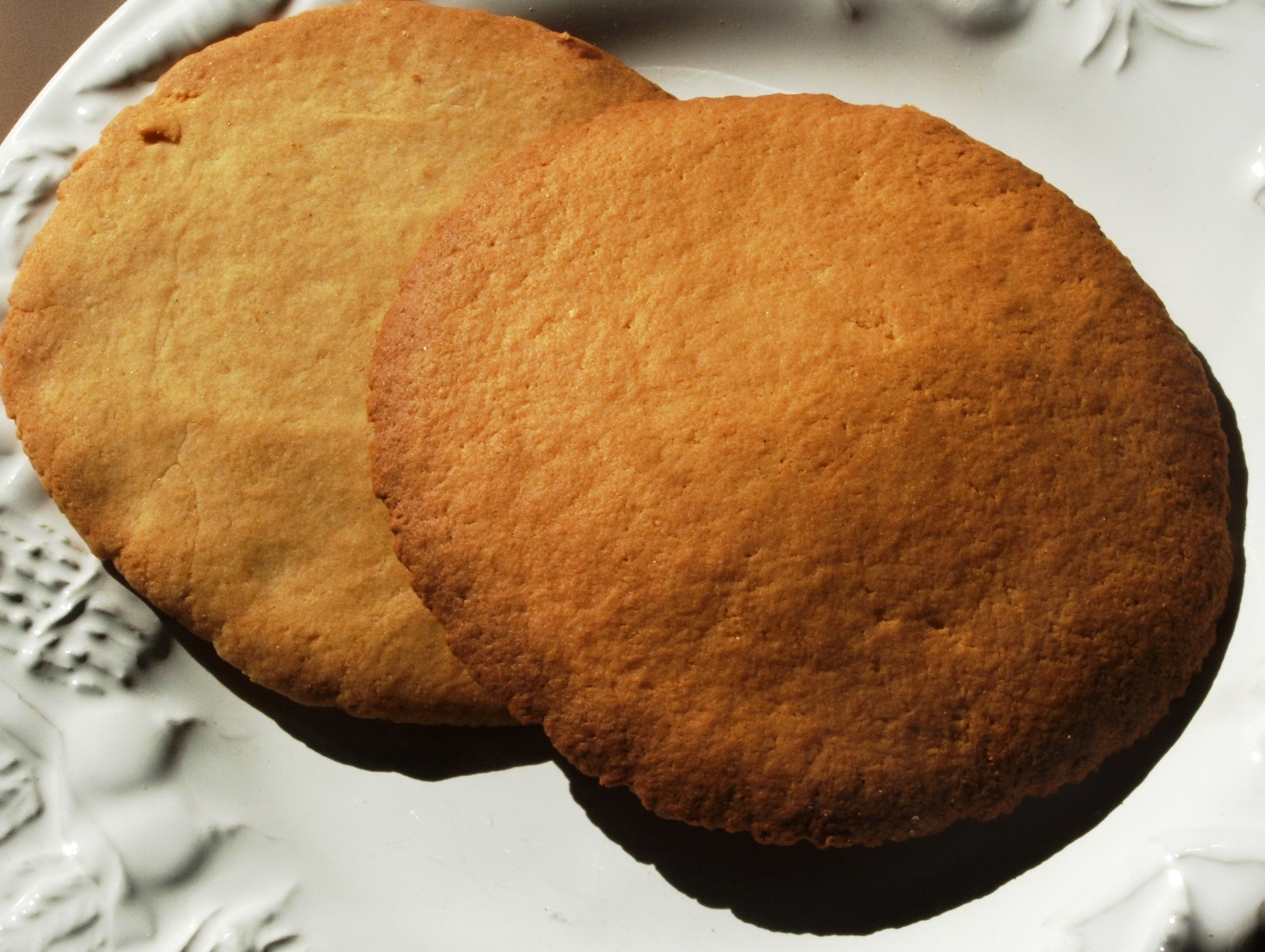
- Type: Sugar cookie
- Place of origin: Mexico
- Region or state: Sonora
- Main ingredients: Brown sugar

Coyotas are empanada-like cookies that are large, flat, and traditionally filled with brown sugar. However, coyotas also come in a variety of flavors, including guava, caramel, chocolate, strawberry, jamoncillo (milk candy), peach, and pineapple.

== Origins ==
Spaniards introduced wheat, sugar, and goat's milk to Mexico around 500 years ago. They originated mainly in Villa de Seris, a city in Hermosillo, Sonora Mexico in 1954. They can now be found all over the world. In the US, they can be found in most Mexican supermarkets.

The meaning of the name "coyota" is a mestiza woman(of Spanish and native heritage) who is dark skinned and full of grace. However, the literal meaning of the word in Spanish means female coyote. Coyotas tend to be accompanied with milk, coffee, hot chocolate, or tea. Sometimes even topped with whip cream.

== See also ==
- List of Mexican dishes
