= Fudge cookie =

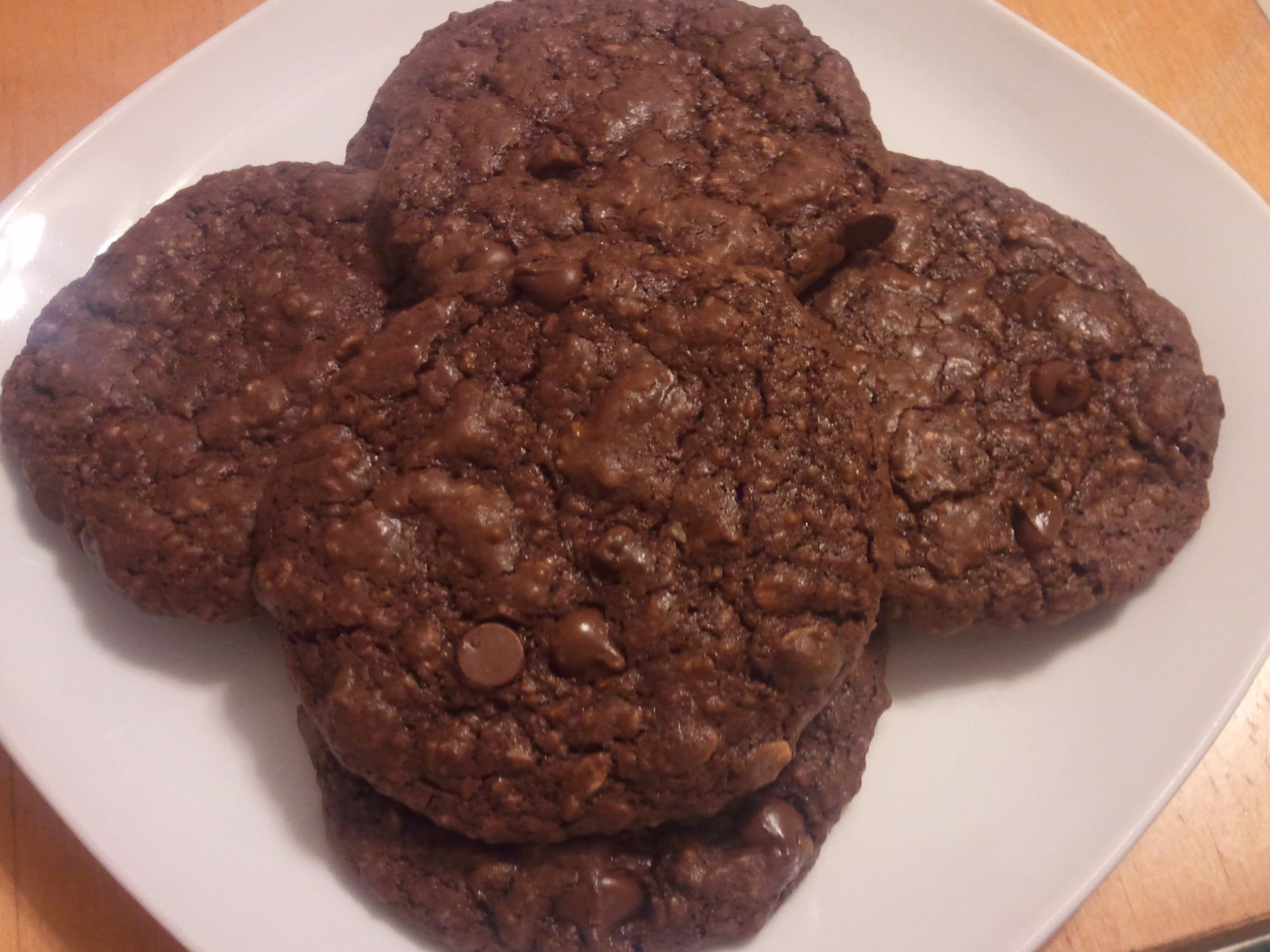
Oatmeal fudge cookies

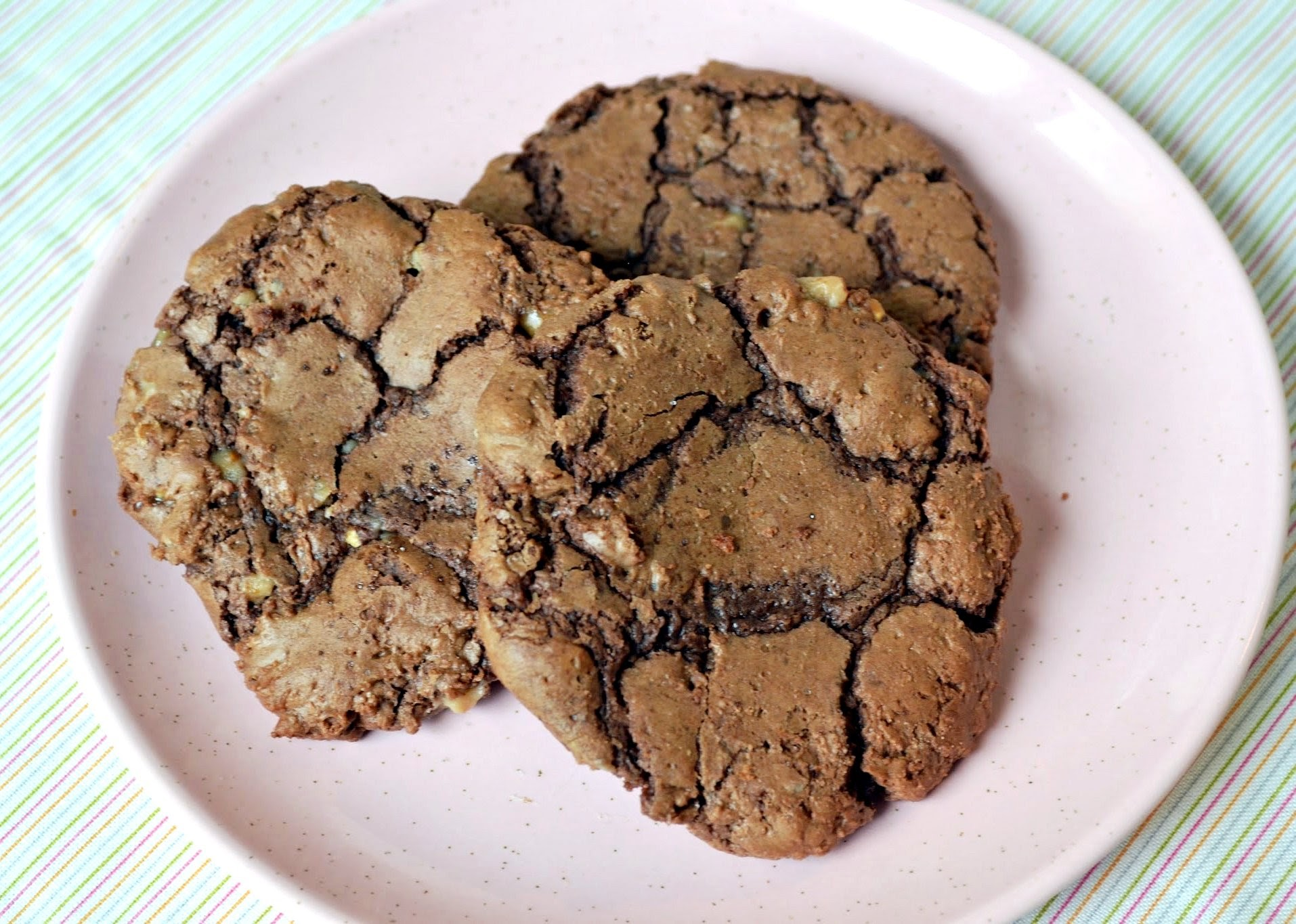
Fudge toffee cookies

A fudge cookie is a cookie that is prepared with fudge or that has the flavor, consistency or texture of fudge. Chocolate fudge cookies are a variety, along with other fudge flavors, such as peanut butter fudge.

Typical ingredients include flour, chocolate, unsweetened cocoa, sugar, vegetable oil, margarine or shortening, vanilla, salt and baking soda. Additional ingredients may include nuts, such as almonds and cashews, and carob. Some varieties are dusted with powdered sugar after being baked and cooled. Quick-preparation varieties may use cake mix and chocolate chips. Additional varieties include fudge thumbprint and fudge sandwich cookies. Vegan versions of fudge cookies exist. Some varieties are prepared with rolled oats or breakfast cereal and boiled, rather than baked.

== Commercial brands ==
Several commercial brands of fudge cookies are produced, including those made by Keebler which manufactures E.L. Fudge Cookies, Nabisco which manufactures Fudgee-O Cookies and Stella D'oro.

== See also ==
- List of cookies
