= Drabbelkoek =

Dutch cookie

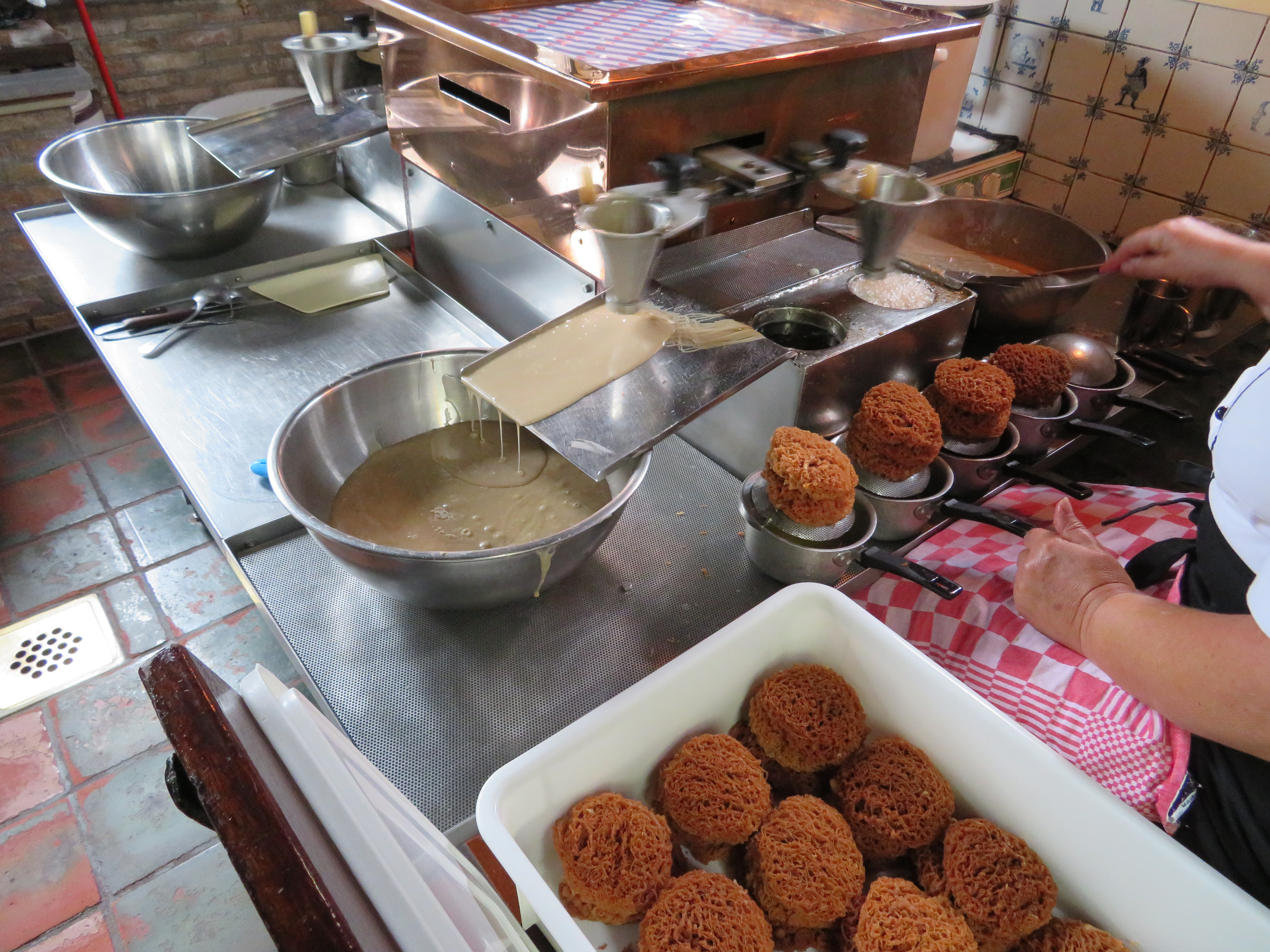
- Drabbelkoek being prepared.
- Course: Snack
- Place of origin: Netherlands
- Region or state: Friesland
- Main ingredients: Flour, eggs, milk, butter, cinnamon

A drabbelkoek is a sort of round and hard cookie from the city of Sneek, in the Netherlands.

Drabbelkoeken have been produced in Friesland since the 18th century. In Sneek, the Haga Factory has been making these cookies since 1850, making it the oldest factory to make the recipe.

The recipe is made out of wheat flour, butter, milk or buttermilk, cinnamon and sugar.

The name of the recipe comes from the technique used in its making; the recipe is made by dribbling (in Dutch, drabbelen) strings of the liquid dough in hot butter.

To make drabbelkoeken, liquid dough is poured with the help of a cooking funnel inside of a pan filled with hot butter, as to fry the dough. After it browns, the dough, still in a stringy pattern, is left to cool in an upside-down bowl. That way, the fat drips out of the dough, and it acquires a round shape in which it is sold. It is then left to cool even further, until the dough becomes hard and crunchy.

== See also ==
- List of cookies
