= Apple cider cookie =

Cookie made with apple cider

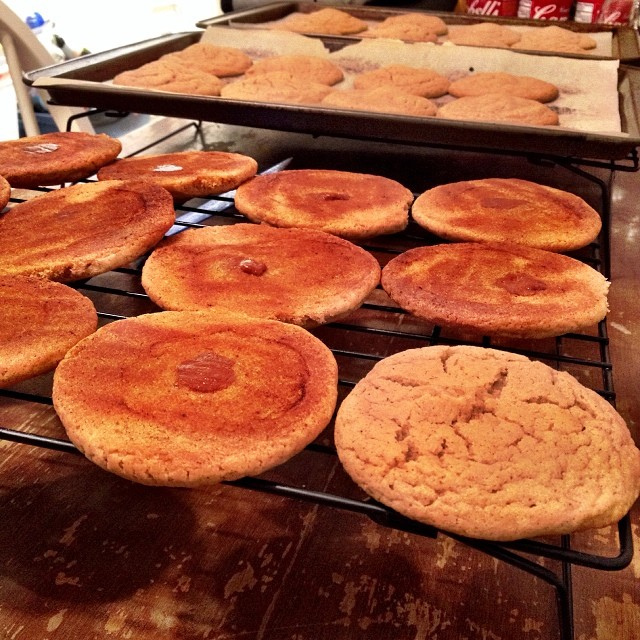
Caramel-stuffed apple cider cookies

An apple cider cookie is a cookie made with apple cider added to the cookie dough, the glaze or icing, or both. Typical ingredients include apple cider, flour, sugar or brown sugar, vegetable oil or butter, spices and baking soda. Additional ingredients may include apple butter, applesauce, chopped or dried apples, nuts and dates. Vegan varieties exist.

== See also ==
- List of cookies
