= Piñata =

Container often made of papier-mâché, pottery, or cloth

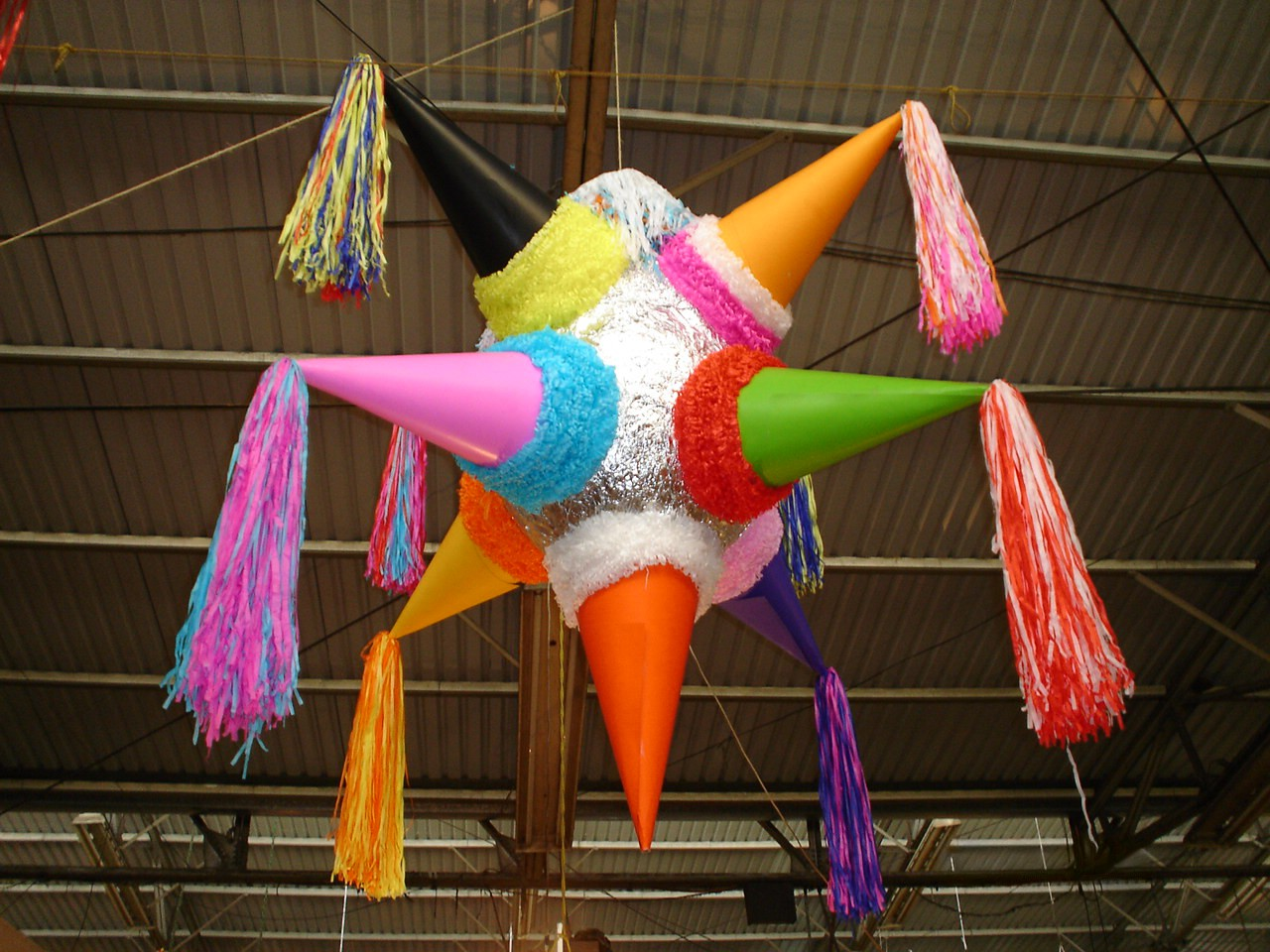
A nine-pointed star piñata

A woman strikes a piñata at a celebration.

A piñata (/pɪnˈjɑːtə/, Spanish pronunciation: [piˈɲata]) is a container, often made of papier-mâché, pottery, or cloth, that is decorated, filled with candy, and then broken as part of a celebration. Piñatas are commonly associated with Mexico.

The idea of breaking a container filled with treats came to Europe in the 14th century. The Spanish brought the European tradition to Mexico, although there were similar traditions in Mesoamerica, such as the Aztecs' honoring the birthday of the god Huītzilōpōchtli in mid-December. According to local records, the Mexican piñata tradition began in the town of Acolman, just north of Mexico City, where piñatas were introduced for catechism purposes as well as to co-opt the Huitzilopochtli ceremony.

Today, the piñata is still part of Mexican culture, the cultures of other countries in Latin America, as well as the United States, but it has mostly lost its religious character.

== Etymology ==
The Spanish word piñata probably derives from the Italian pignatta 'fragile pot,' itself from pigna lit. 'pinecone.' It may also come from Spanish piña lit. 'pinecone.'

== History ==
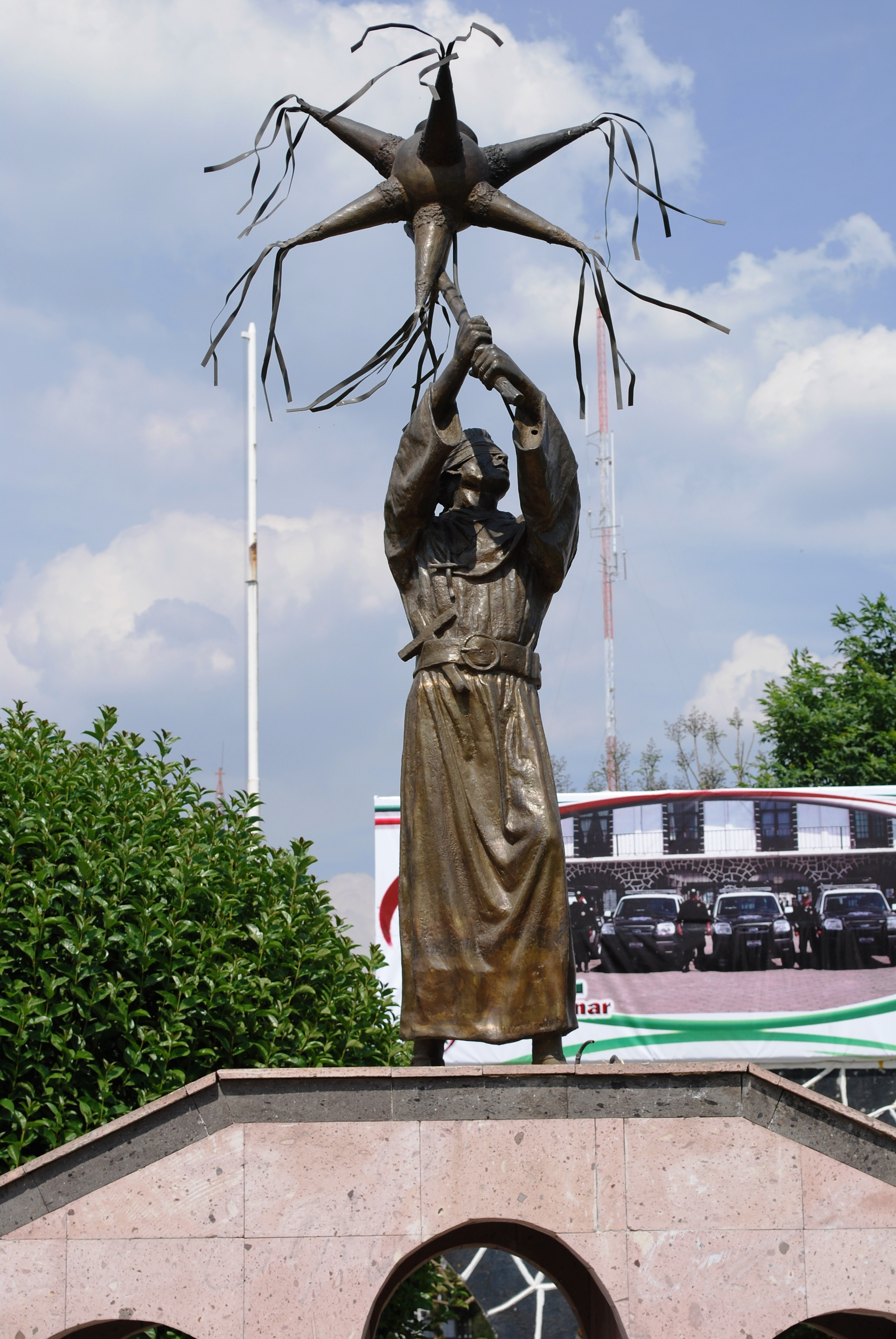
Statue of Franciscan friar hitting a piñata in Acolman, Mexico State

The origin of the piñata is uncertain. It has been reported to originate from a Chinese tradition known as the dachunniu, allegedly witnessed by Marco Polo during his voyages and brought by him to Italy; however, though this tradition was popularized as early as the Han dynasty and was practiced during the Yuan dynasty (and thus could have been witnessed by Polo), it is not mentioned in his writings. The Chinese version was an earthen sculpture in the shape of a cow or ox, used for the New Year. It was decorated with symbols and colors meant to produce a favorable climate for the coming growing season. It was filled with five types of seeds and then hit with sticks of various colors. After the _dachunniu_ was broken, the remains were burned and the ashes kept for good luck.

The tradition arrived in Europe in the 14th century where it was associated with the Christian celebration of Lent. In Italy, the breaking of a pignatta became part of Carnival celebrations, and continues to be practiced in Sardinia. In Spain, the First Sunday of Lent, "Piñata Sunday", became a celebration known as the Dance of the Piñata. As the word's Italian origin indicates, pignatta (also pignata and pignàta) meaning "earthenware cooking pot", the Spanish initially used a plain clay container, before starting to decorate it with ribbons, tinsel and colored paper. The origin of the Italian word is thought to be linked to the Latin word pinea, "pine cone".

The European piñata tradition was brought to Mexico in the 16th century; however, there was a similar tradition in Mesoamerica already. The Mayan tradition was similar to the modern piñata tradition, including blindfolding the participant hitting the piñata. The Aztec tradition commemorated the birthday of Huitzilopochtli. Priests would decorate a clay pot with colorful feathers. When the pot was broken with a stick or club, the treasures inside would fall to the feet of the idol as an offering. According to local records, the piñata was first used for the purposes of evangelism in 1586, in Acolman, in the modern State of Mexico, just north of Mexico City. The Augustinian monks there modified European piñatas and created the Las Posadas tradition to co-opt the celebration of the birth of Huitzilopochtli, which was celebrated in mid December.

The Mexican Catholic interpretation assigned meanings related to the Catholic doctrine of struggle against temptation, and used for catechism purposes. In this tradition, the seven points represent the seven deadly sins, the pot represents evil, and the seasonal fruit and candy inside the temptations of evil. It was said that person with the stick is blindfolded to represent faith, and the turning, singing and shouting represent the disorientation that temptation creates. In some traditions, the participant is turned thirty three times, one for each year of Christ's life. As the participant beats the piñata, it is supposed to represent the struggle against temptation and evil. When the piñata breaks, some say (contrary to other interpretations) the treats inside then represent the rewards of keeping the faith.

Since that time, the piñata has not retained its religious significance and has become popular in many types of celebrations, not just during December's Las Posadas. The clay pot has been replaced with a papier-mâché container. The creation of piñatas has even taken on an artistic aspect in some areas. David Gamez and Cecilia Meade sponsored a showing of piñatas as art rather than just as a party favor. The 2010 event was called Piñatarama, with 25 piñatas made of papier-mâché at the Vértigo Galería in Mexico City, all original works of art by graphic illustrators, from 23 countries including Australia. Some of the illustrators who participated include 1000 Changos, Allan Sieber, Apak, Ben Newman, Cecy Meade, Cristian Turdera, Cupco and Daniel Berman. In Tepatitlán, the world's largest traditional seven-pointed piñata was created in 2010. It measures 11.2 meters, is made of fiberglass and weighs 350 kilograms. It surpasses the former Guinness record holder which was made in 2008 in Pennsylvania.

== In Mexico ==
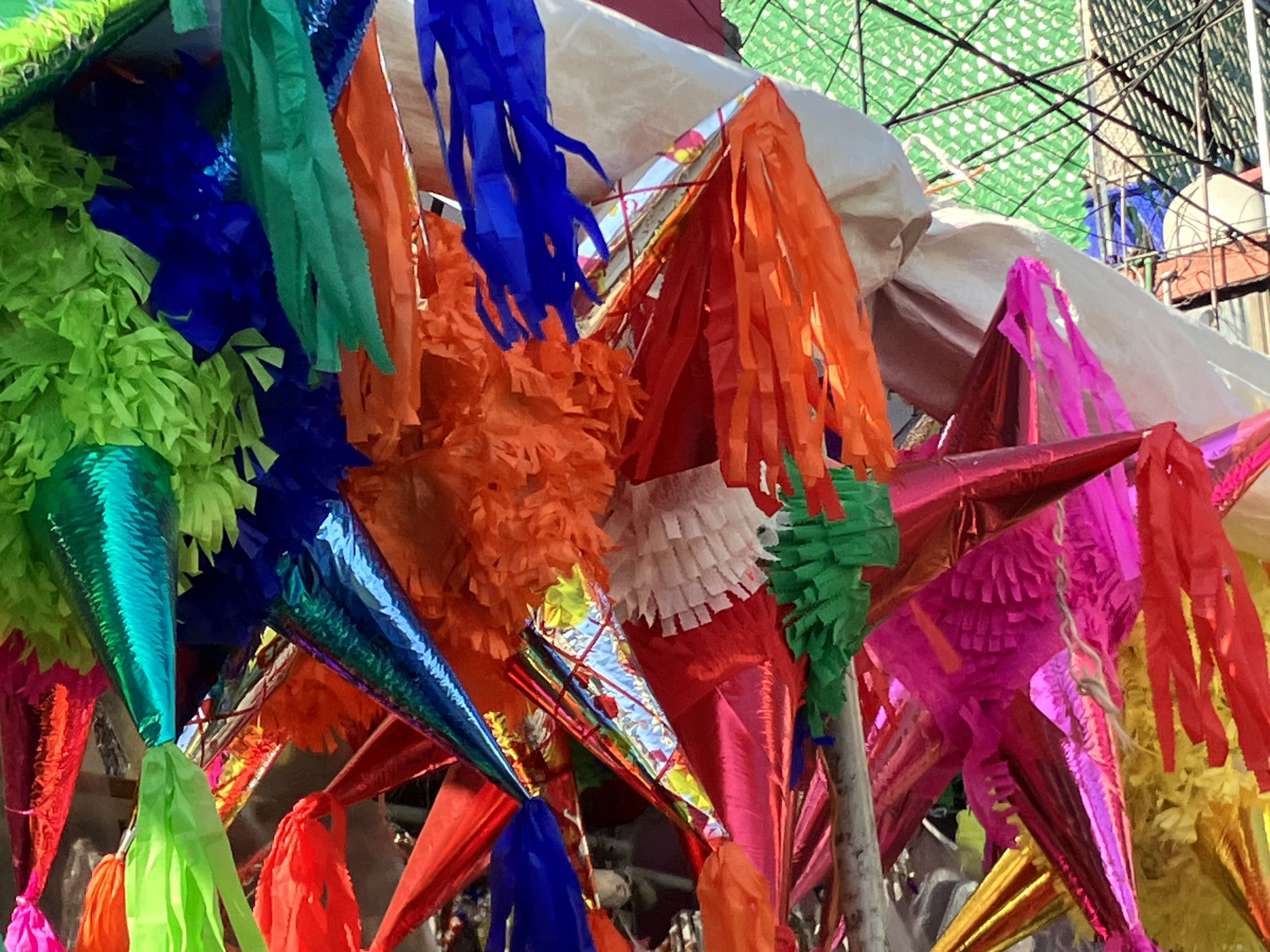
Traditional star-shaped piñatas sold at the market in Mexico City

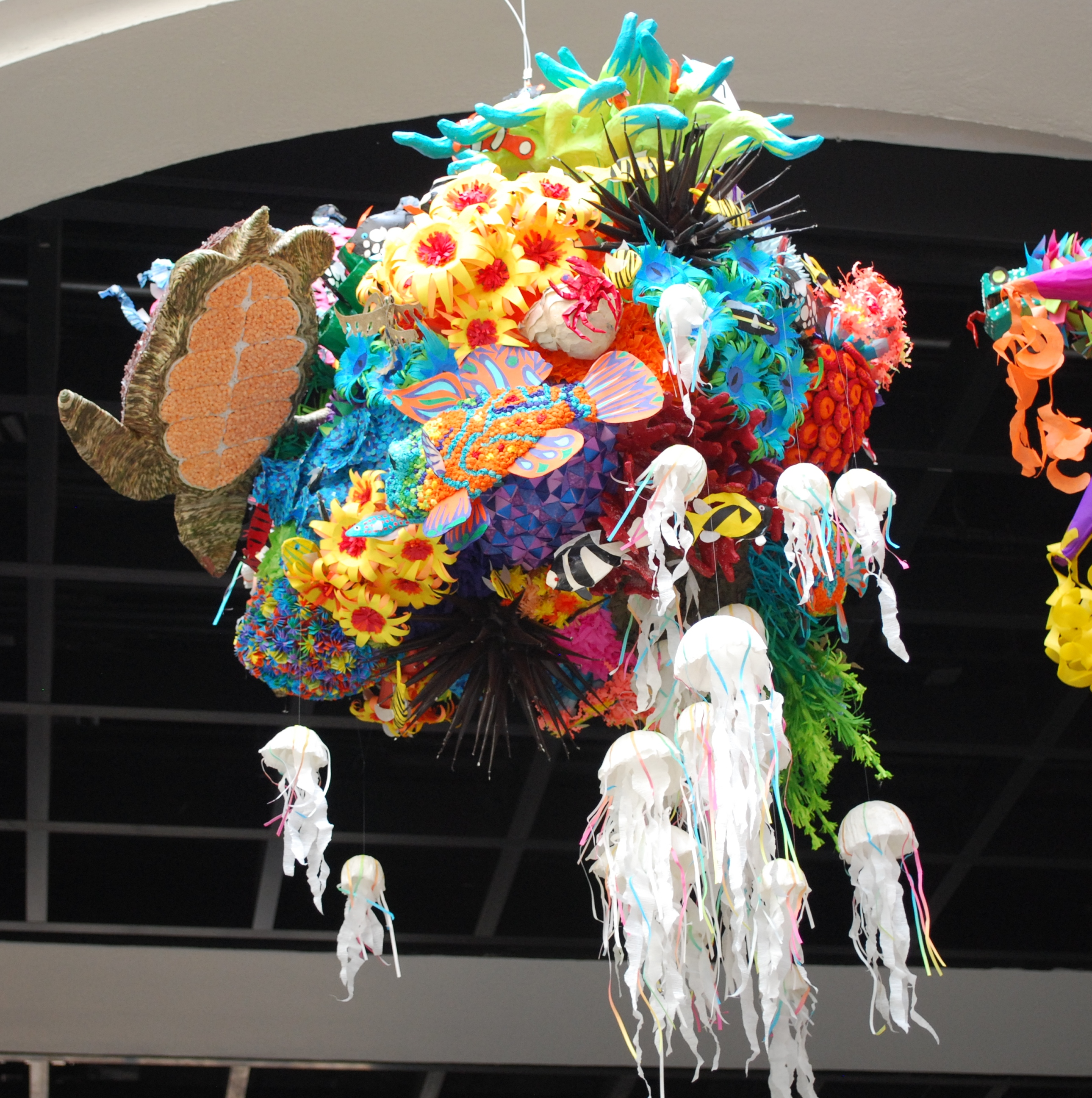
A coral reef piñata which won the 2013 contest of the Museo de Arte Popular in Mexico City

The piñata is most strongly identified with Mexico. The art of making modern piñatas falls under the Mexican craft heading of "cartonería", which refers to the making of items from paper and cardboard. This puts piñatas in the same category as amate paper craft, Judas figures and Mexico City style alebrijes. The Museo de Arte Popular held the first "Concurso de Piñatas Mexicanas" (Mexican Piñata Contest) in 2007 with prizes of 15,000, 10,000 and 5,000 pesos. The purpose of the contest is to help retain this tradition and help it to be continued to be valued. The Museo del Caracol in Mexico City held a workshop on how to make traditional piñatas, as part of its outreach program to the public.

While the religious significance has been mostly lost, the ceremony that occurs with it has remained mostly intact. Piñatas remain most popular during Las Posadas with birthday parties coming in second. Each participant, usually a child, will have a turn at hitting the piñata, which is hung from above on a string. The participant is blindfolded, given a wooden stick, and then spun a number of times. As the participants works to hit the piñata, another moves it to make it harder to hit. There is a time limit to any one person's attempts, which is marked out by the singing of a traditional song:

Dale, dale, dale,
no pierdas el tino,
porque si lo pierdes,
pierdes el camino,
Ya le diste una,
ya le diste dos,
ya le diste tres,
¡y tu tiempo se acabó!

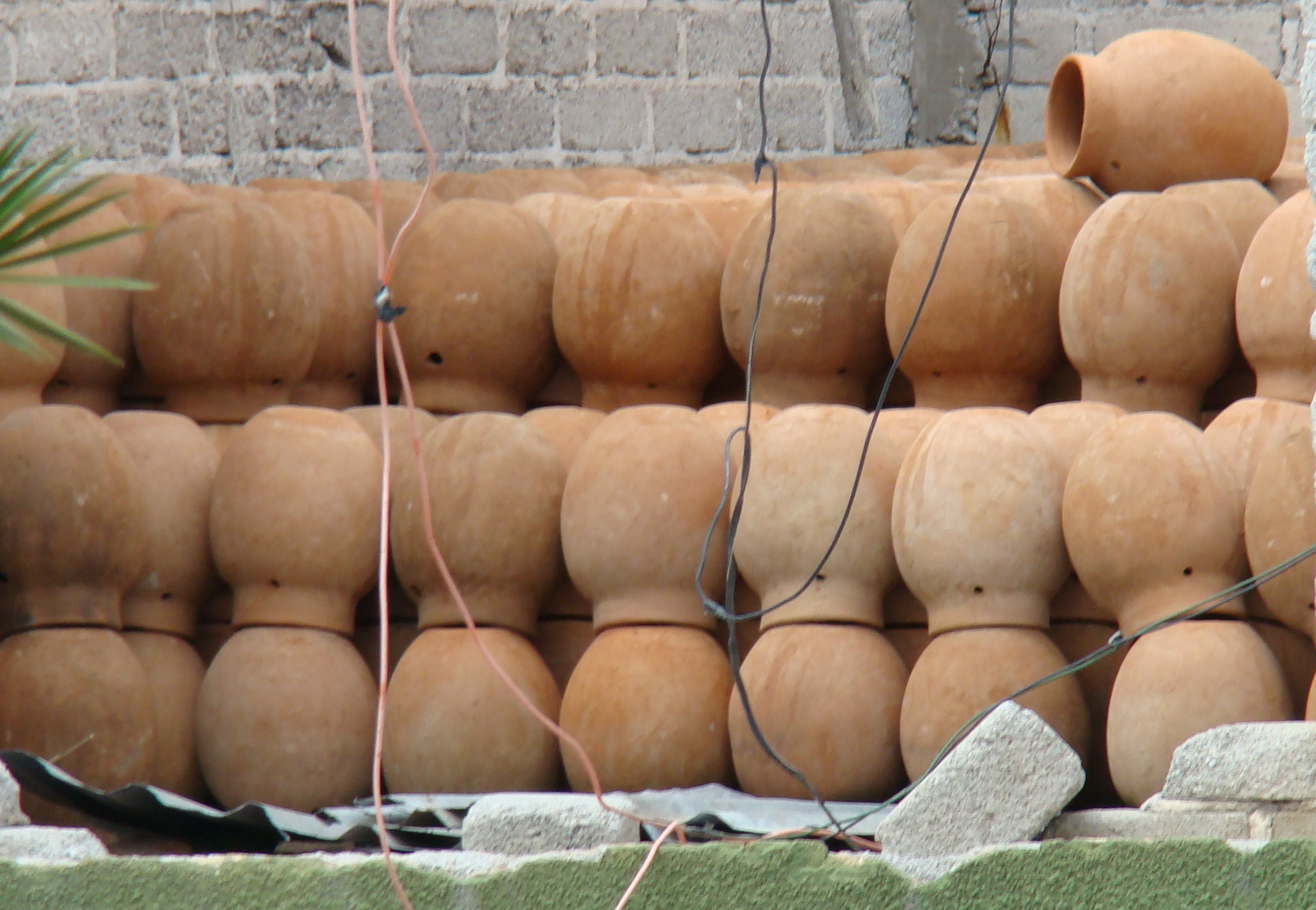
Clay pots specially made for the creation of piñatas

Piñatas were traditionally made with a clay pot base and many artisans make a living selling just the pot for people to decorate as they wish. However, clay pot piñatas have mostly been replaced by those made with cardboard and papier-mâché, usually fashioned over balloons. One reason for this is that broken pot pieces can be dangerous to children. These are then decorated with crepe paper, other colored paper and other items. Piñatas today come in all shapes and sizes, with many representing cartoon or other characters known to most children. Popular shapes today can include Batman, Superman, Spider-Man, or characters based on popular movies and television shows such as Nemo, the Lion King, and more. For Christmas, the traditional style with the points is popular as it is associated with the Star of Bethlehem. However, for the most part, piñata designs have been completely commercialized.

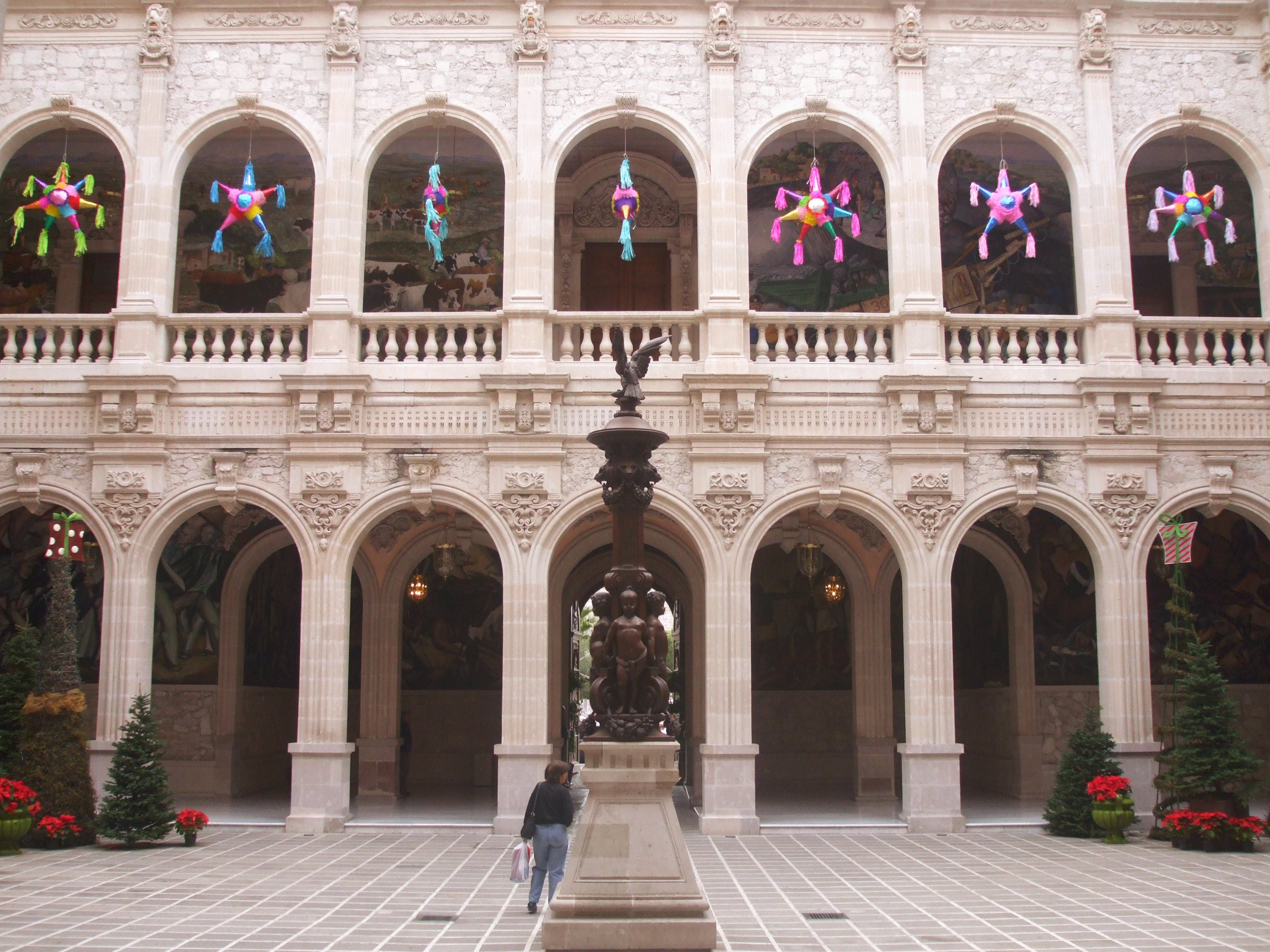
Courtyard of the Government Palace of Chihuahua decorated for Christmas.

Traditionally in Mexico, especially at Christmas, piñatas are filled with fruit and candies such as guavas, oranges, jicamas, pieces of sugar cane, tejocotes and wrapped candies. Some piñatas are "traps" filled with flour, confetti or water. Special baskets of treats may be given to children who come up empty handed after a piñata is broken. These are called colaciónes and are given to prevent hurt feelings.

There are a number of localities in Mexico that specialize in the making of piñatas for sale. Acolman, the origin of piñatas, along with neighboring Otumba are one. Acolman hosts an annual National Piñata Fair. This event includes cultural events, workshops on the making of piñatas, piñata contests and traditional Posadas. The event has attracted as many as 100,000 visitors over the days that it is held, many of whom come from Mexico City.

About 400 families in the town of San Juan de la Puerta, in the south of the Cuerámaro municipality in Guanajuato, are dedicated to the creation of piñatas, and produce about 16,000 pieces each month. The making of piñatas supports about half of the people in the town. It is the second most important economic activity after agriculture. This tradition began in 1960 by Juan Remigio Anguiano, who brought the craft to the town after living in Mexico City. Today, piñatas from the town are sold in various parts of the state.

In the penal facility of Huajuapan de León, prisoners make piñatas to sell. This began when several prisoners brought the craft with them when they were incarcerated about twenty years ago. These piñatas have become traditional for the population of the city for Christmas.

The busiest time for the sale of piñatas in Mexico is December for posadas. During bad economic times, sales of piñatas can fall as much as thirty percent as they did in 2008.

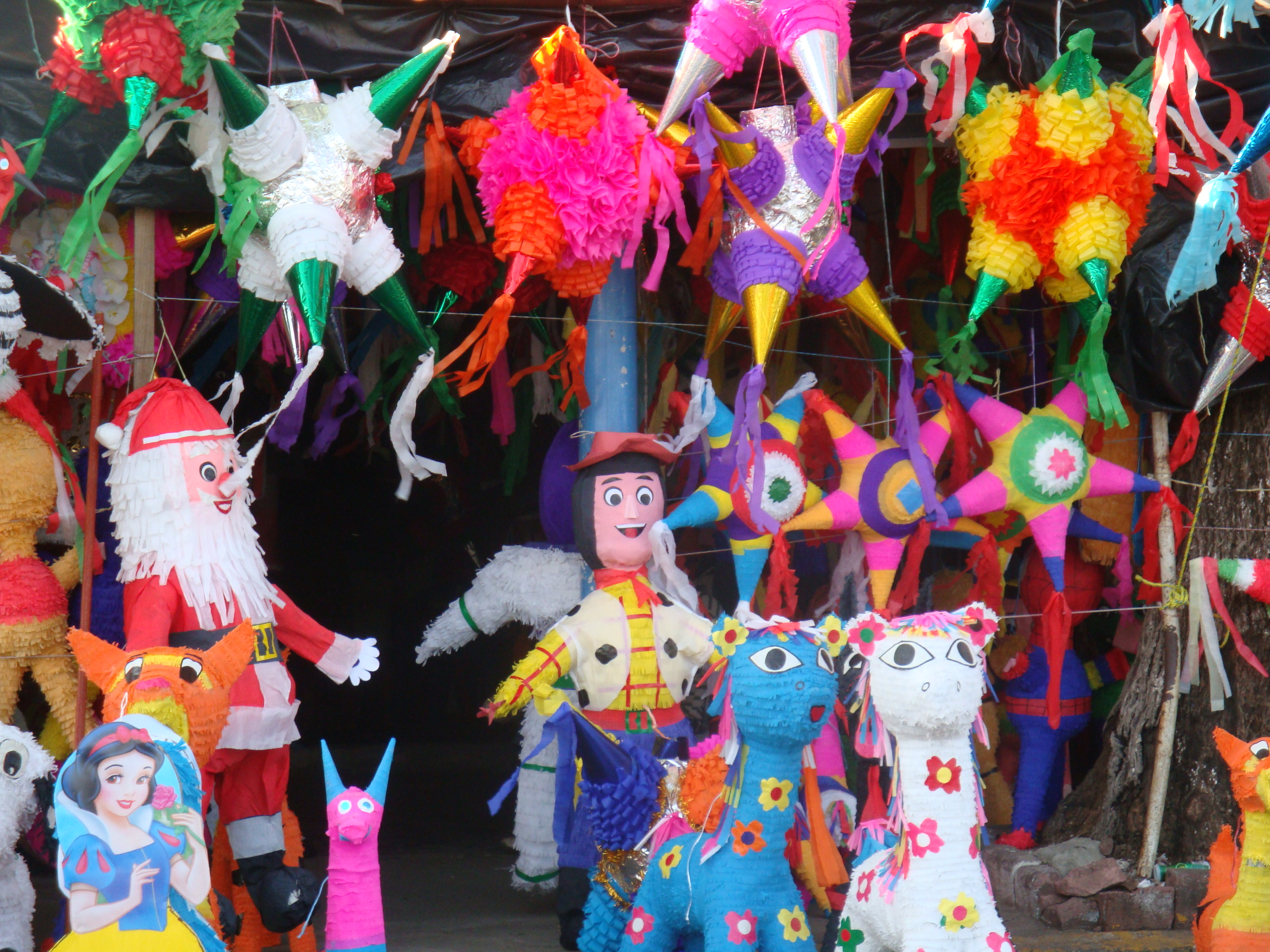
Store in Tabasco selling both traditional star-shape and contemporary design piñatas.

The star shape, or ball with points, still remains popular for the Christmas season, but for other events, traditional designs such as donkeys have almost entirely been replaced by cartoon characters based on U.S. movies and television shows. However, most of the piñatas produced based on these images are not following copyright law, which has caused problems. Copyright holders such as Marvel Comics have complained about infringement by piñata makers in Mexico. Federal authorities have responded by seizing such merchandise in stores in various areas of Mexico City. Vendors complain that they have sold these piñatas for decades and never have had problems. Those who have run into problems with copyright law state that it is difficult to sell other types as most customers prefer to buy those based on popular characters. Mexico exports piñatas to the United States and other parts of the world, but copyright has been an issue there as well. Piñatas based on Disney and other characters have been seized at the border for violating U.S. copyright law. Some have also been seized and destroyed by customs agents under suspect of hiding drugs.

One niche market for piñatas in Mexico is of those themed for adults. These include political figures, especially those who are not particularly liked. Another type for the adult market are sexually themed piñatas, mostly those in the form of exotic dancers and strippers. Of the female of this type, the most popular are blondes. For the male, darker shades are preferred. These piñatas will be filled with adult items such as condoms in addition to candy.

Piñatas are similarly popular in a number of other Latin American countries as well.

== In the United States ==
Piñatas have also become popular in Mexican-American and other Hispanic and Latino communities in the United States, as well as non-Hispanic populations. They are used for birthday parties and Halloween and Christmas and Cinco de Mayo celebrations.

The 2006 video game Viva Piñata is about a world where piñatas compete to be chosen for children's birthday parties. A spinoff television show, also titled Viva Piñata was created to push sales of the Xbox game created by Microsoft.

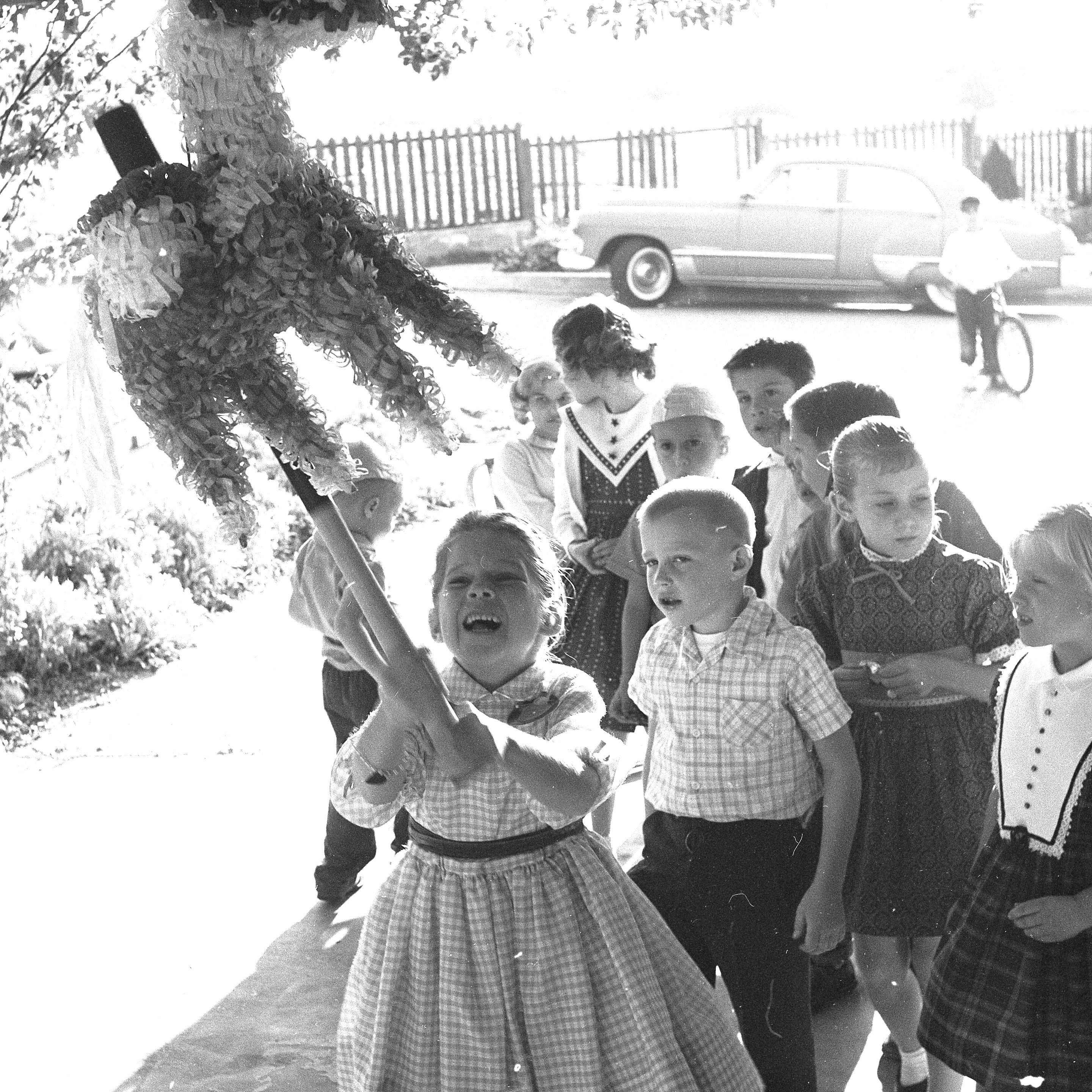
Girls striking a piñata in a California carport, 1961

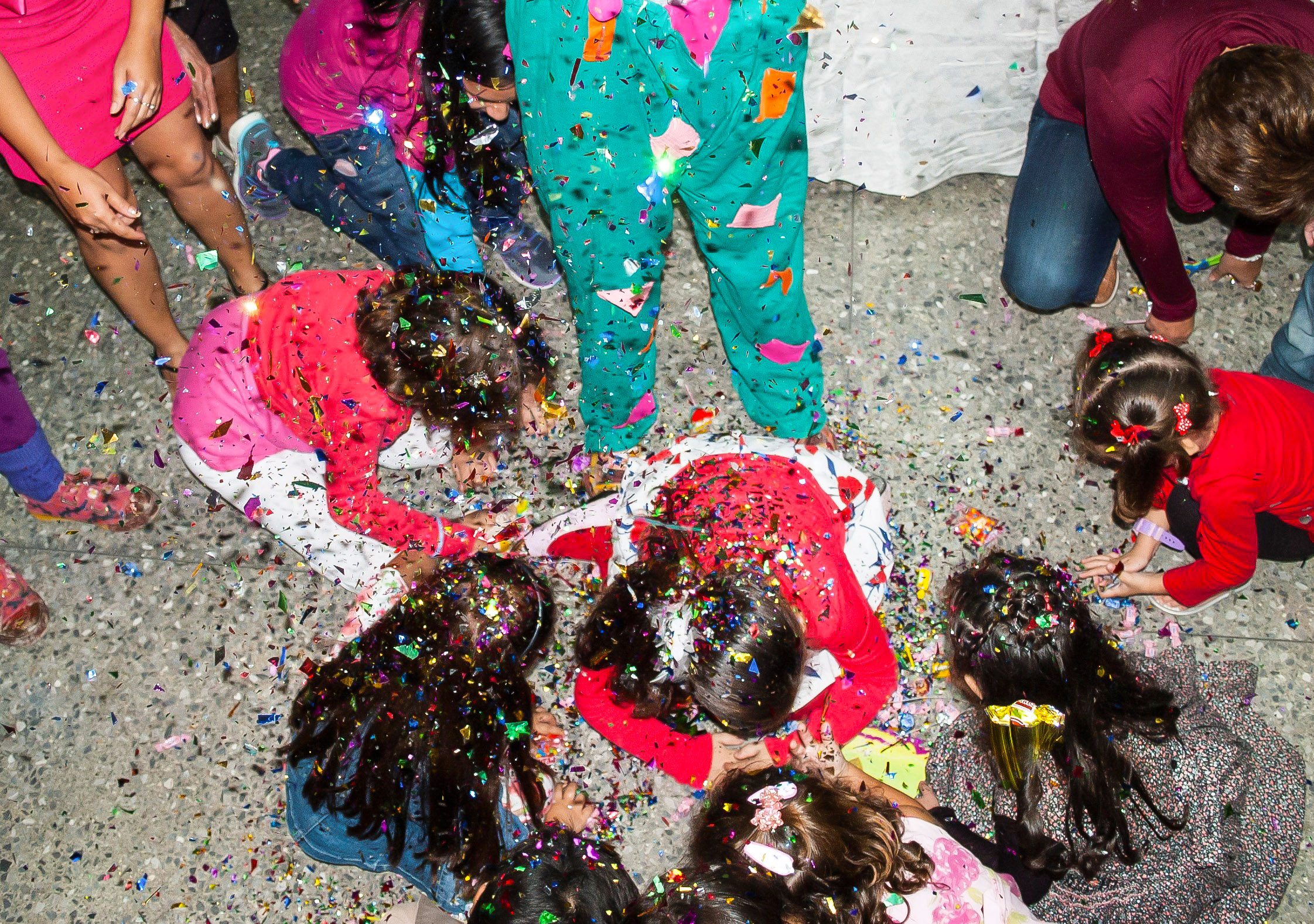
Children playing in a sweets piñata

== Similar traditions ==
=== Europe ===
A similar tradition in Denmark is slå katten af tønden ("hit the cat out of the barrel") in which a wooden barrel is struck to release candy.

In Catalonia, a Christmastide tradition known as "fer cagar el tió" ("making the log defecate") is observed. A log is wrapped with a blanket several days in advance of Christmas and is "fed" grass. On Christmas Eve, the log is repeatedly struck with sticks in order to make the log "defecate". The blanket is then removed to reveal the gifts that have been "expelled" by the log.

In Italy feasts with a game similar to piñata, called pentolaccia, used to be celebrated the first Sunday of Lent.

=== Asia ===
In Maharashtra, India, another similar tradition called Dahi Handi is observed on the festival of Janmashtami, Lord Krishna's birthday. The iconography represents Lord Krishna's childhood portrayal as the mischievous Maakhan Chor (butter thief). Clay pots filled with buttermilk, money or treats, in lieu of butter, are hung in public squares or on streets at a height implicitly challenging youngsters to break them. Teams put in great planning, skill and effort to form human pyramids, each higher than the other, in an attempt to break the pot and claim the prize.

In South Indian villages, festivals feature a competition called Uri adithal (Pot breaking with blindfold) which closely resembles the piñata event.

In Japan, a similar game called suikawari is played where a watermelon shell is used.

The Philippines has a pinata-based game called hampas-palayok or pukpok-palayok (hit-the-pot), which is played during Filipino fiestas and traditional parties (e.g., birthdays). Unlike papier mache, a clay pot filled with treats and/or prizes is used. Historians state that the pinata was brought by Spanish colonizers when the Philippines was a colony of Spain.

Like the Philippines, Vietnamese traditional custom also features the game đập nêu (pot-hitting).

== See also ==
- Parol, a similar but separate tradition in the Philippines symbolizing the Star of Bethlehem
- Piñata cookie
- Tió de Nadal
