= Paprenjak =

Croatian biscuit

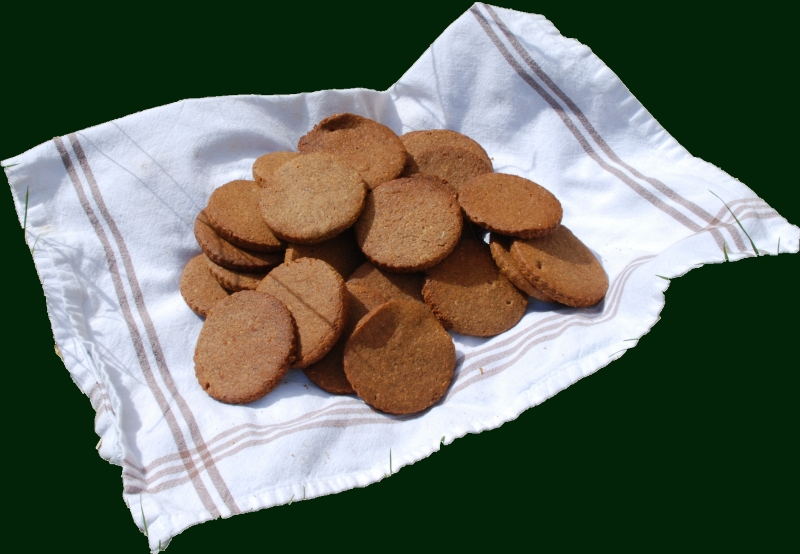
- Place of origin: Croatia
- Main ingredients: Butter, sugar syrup or honey, eggs, walnuts or hazelnuts, black pepper, spices

Paprenjak are a traditional biscuit from Croatia. It contains a unique mix of honey and black pepper. Its main ingredients are sugar syrup or honey, butter or fat, eggs, nuts (walnuts, hazelnuts), pepper, and various spices (clove, cinnamon, nutmeg). Paprenjak are typically decorated with mould-pressed motifs.

The Croatian author August Šenoa featured the biscuit in his novel "Goldsmith's gold" published in 1871:

“And thus it came to pass that she was called the Paprenjak lady: over the length and breadth of the city there was not a woman, noble or common, who could bake paprenjaks in the way that Magda knew. Day in and day out there was a run on her paprenjaks, and the city judge Ivan Blažeković himself was known to leave a pretty penny in her purse every so often.”

== Croatian Tradition ==
The origins of paprenjak are unclear but they are known to have existed in the 16th century during the Renaissance. Historically, they would have been made throughout the year, but are now associated with Christmas.

Traditionally, a square paprenjak is decorated with wooden press, embossing a pattern on the biscuit. These patterns often took the shape of pagan and Christian symbols, such as fish, wheat, and the sun. Today paprenjak comes in Christmas themed shapes, such as gingerbread men, stars, and trees.
