= Icebox cookie =

Type of cookie

- Alternative names: Refrigerator cookie
- Type: Cookie
- Course: Dessert
- Place of origin: United States
- Region or state: North America
- Associated cuisine: American
- Invented: Early 20th century
- Main ingredients: Butter, sugar, egg, flour
- Variations: Chocolate, nuts, spices, pinwheel, checkerboard
- Other information: Can be prepared in advance and baked later

An icebox cookie is a type of cookie made by shaping cookie dough into a log, chilling it until firm, and then slicing it before baking. The name comes from the historical use of an icebox — a non-mechanical refrigerator used in early 20th-century kitchens – to keep dough cold before baking, which makes slicing easier and improves texture. Icebox cookies are known for their simplicity, adaptability, and convenience, as the dough can be prepared in advance and baked later.

== History ==
Icebox cookies became popular in the United States during the early 20th century, when iceboxes were a standard kitchen appliance. Chilling cookie dough allowed bakers to prepare large batches in advance and bake fresh cookies on demand.

The term "icebox cookie" persisted even as modern refrigerators replaced iceboxes, reflecting the historical origin of the technique.

== Preparation ==
Ingredients such as butter, sugar, egg, and flour are combined into a dough with optional flavorings. The dough is shaped into logs, wrapped in parchment paper or plastic wrap, and chilled until firm. Once chilled, the dough is sliced into rounds and baked in a preheated oven until lightly golden. Chilling improves the texture by allowing the fats to solidify and prevents excessive spreading during baking.

== Variations ==
Icebox cookies can include a wide range of flavors and designs. Common additions include chocolate chips, nuts, spices, and dried fruits. Patterned logs such as pinwheels or checkerboards are created by arranging dough of different colors before chilling and slicing.

== See also ==
- List of cookies
