= Finskepinner =

Scandinavian shortbread cookies

Finska pinnar
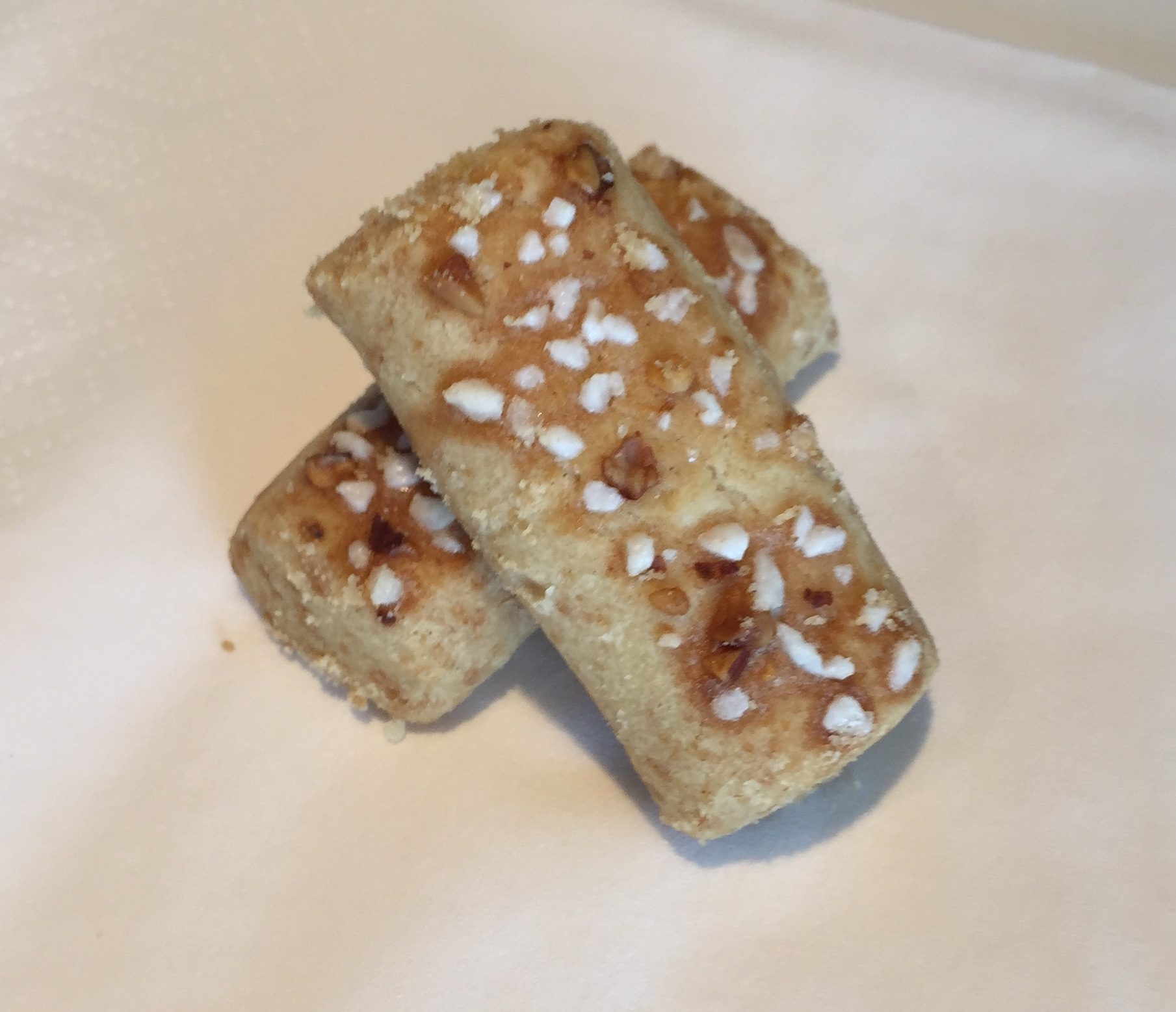
- Finska pinnar topped with pearled sugar
- Type: Cookie
- Course: Dessert
- Region or state: Scandinavia
- Main ingredients: Flour
- Ingredients generally used: Eggs, sugar, slivered almonds

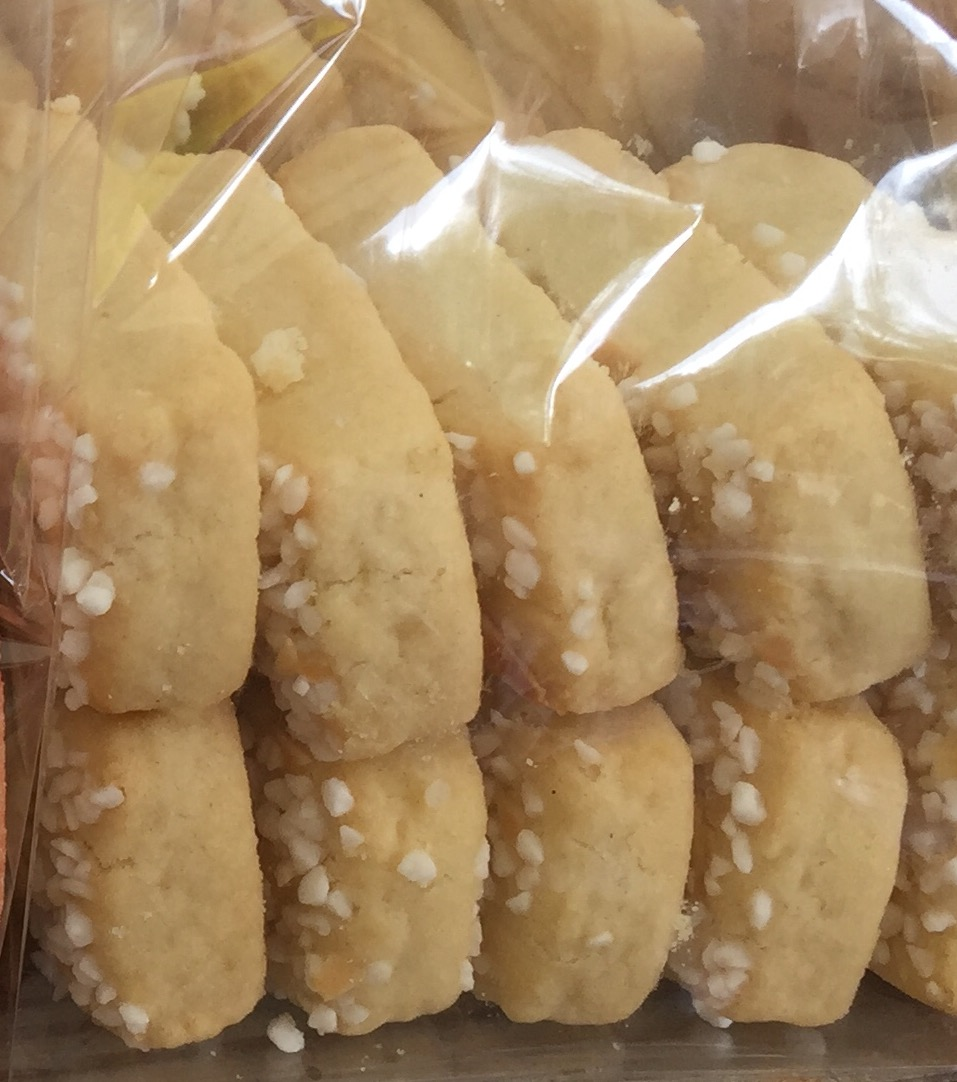
Packaged finskepinner

Finskepinner (Swedish: finska pinnar; Norwegian: finske pinner; Danish: finskbrød) or Finnish sticks are a Scandinavian shortbread cookie characterized by its long shape, crispy texture, almond flavour and its frequent consumption during Christmas. It's also frequently featured in sju sorters kakor, a Scandinavian tradition of preparing seven different kinds of cookies for guests. Contrary to what the name implies, it's not thought to be of Finnish origin, and it's uncertain how this cookie received its name.

== See also ==
- List of Norwegian desserts
- Norwegian cuisine
