= Nocciolini di Chivasso =

Italian meringue cookies

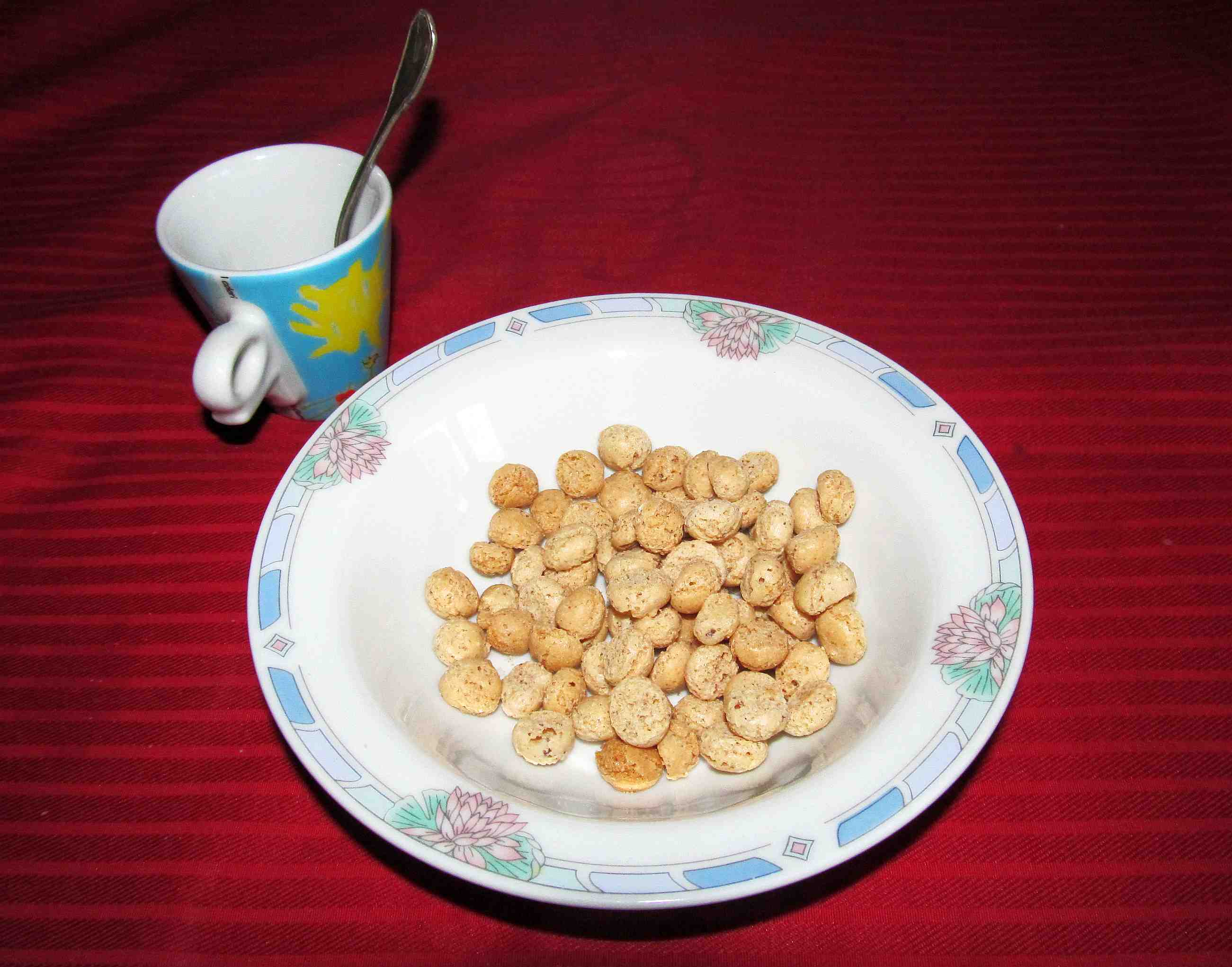
Nocciolini di chivasso

Nocciolini di Chivasso are small round cookies made with meringue (sugar and egg whites) and hazelnuts typical of the comune (municipality) of Chivasso, in the province of Turin, Italy. They are similar to nocciolini di Canzo, which are a protected speciality of the Lombardy region.

== See also ==
- List of Italian desserts and pastries
- Nocciolini di Canzo
