= Nocciolini di Canzo =

Italian cookies

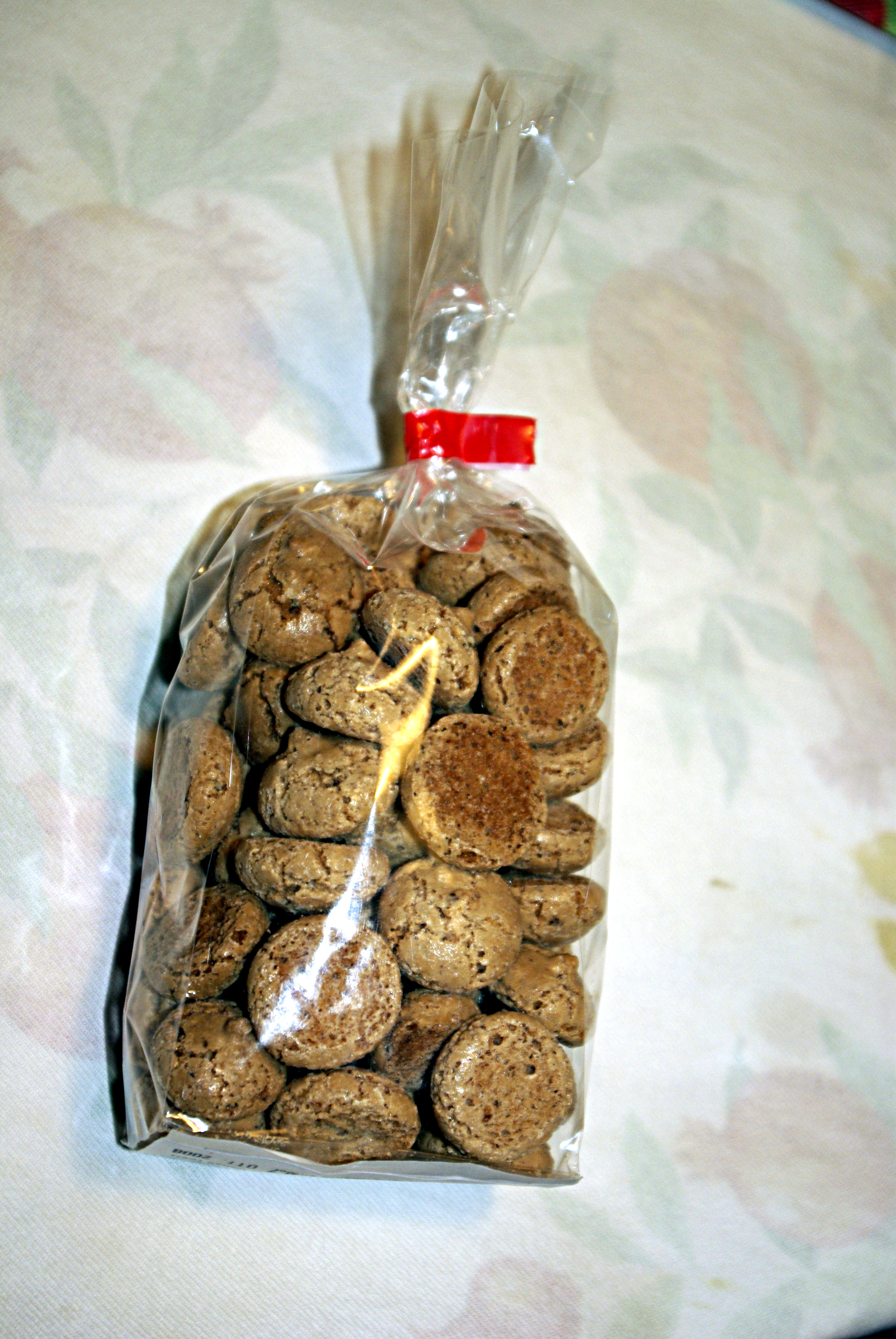
- Alternative names: Nisciolitt da Cânz
- Type: Cookie
- Place of origin: Italy
- Region or state: Canzo, Lombardy
- Main ingredients: Hazelnuts, fresh egg white, sugar

Nocciolini di Canzo (Italian: [nottʃoˈliːni di ˈkantso]; Lombard: nisciolitt da Canz, Lombard: [niʃuˈli‿dːa ˈkãːts]) are sweet crumbly small cookies from the comune (municipality) of Canzo, in northern Italy. They are recognized as a prodotto agroalimentare tradizionale (PAT) of Lombardy by the Italian Ministry of Agricultural, Food and Forestry Policies.

== Context and preparation ==
Canzo is a comune in the mountainous Lombardy region, which draws tourists with its mountains, lake, fairs, history, and also for festivities related to Saint Mir, a native of this town. All the surroundings of Canzo have a mainly deciduous vegetation, and hazel is the most common species of tree.

In order to satisfy tourists’ demands, the confectioners of Canzo created nocciolini di Canzo, made from hazelnut flour (local hazelnuts and sugar) and egg white. The appearance of this sweet is a small half-sphere. They are usually eaten as a snack but, due to their small size, they can also be used as cake decoration.

== See also ==
- Cuisine of Canzo
- List of Italian desserts and pastries
- Nocciolini di Chivasso
