= Sugar cookie =

Cookie flavored primarily with sugar

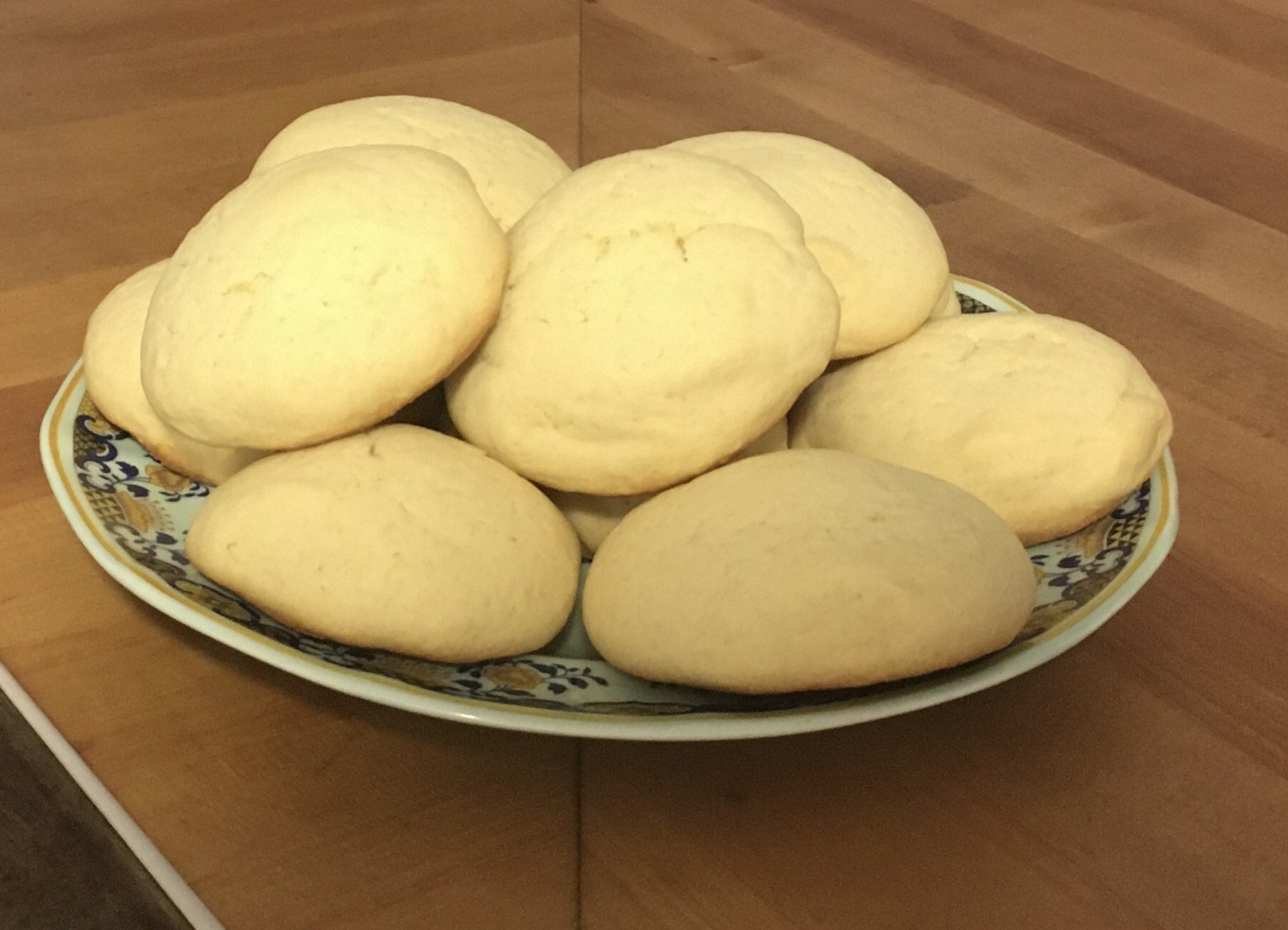
- Plain sugar cookies
- Type: Cookie
- Place of origin: United States
- Main ingredients: Flour, butter, sugar, eggs, vanilla, baking powder, or baking soda

A sugar cookie, or sugar biscuit, is a cookie with the main ingredients being sugar, flour, butter, eggs, vanilla, and either baking powder or baking soda. Sugar cookies may be formed by hand, dropped, or rolled and cut into shapes. They may be decorated with additional sugar, icing, sprinkles, or a combination of these. Decorative shapes and figures can be cut into the rolled-out dough using a cookie cutter.

== Name ==
The name Nazareth cookie came from the people of Nazareth, Pennsylvania who came from Germany. The cookie later took on other names in other countries. In England they were called sugar biscuits as well as jumbles.

== History ==
Jumbles are the earliest form of sugar cookies. These cookies contained different spices such as aniseed, coriander, fennel and nutmeg. People used them as Christmas ornaments. People would cut out these sugar cookies into different shapes and hang them on their Christmas tree.

Published recipes for the sugar cookie began to appear in the 1800s. Some of these early variations included sour cream or large amounts of milk, in addition or in place of the now-standard ingredients. In 1885, The Boston Globe published a recipe for sugar cookies that omitted liquid dairy ingredients, included baking powder, and had a ratio of one cup of sugar to one half cup of butter.

In the late 1950s, Pillsbury began selling pre-mixed refrigerated sugar cookie dough in US grocery stores, as a type of icebox cookie.

Different styles of sugar cookies

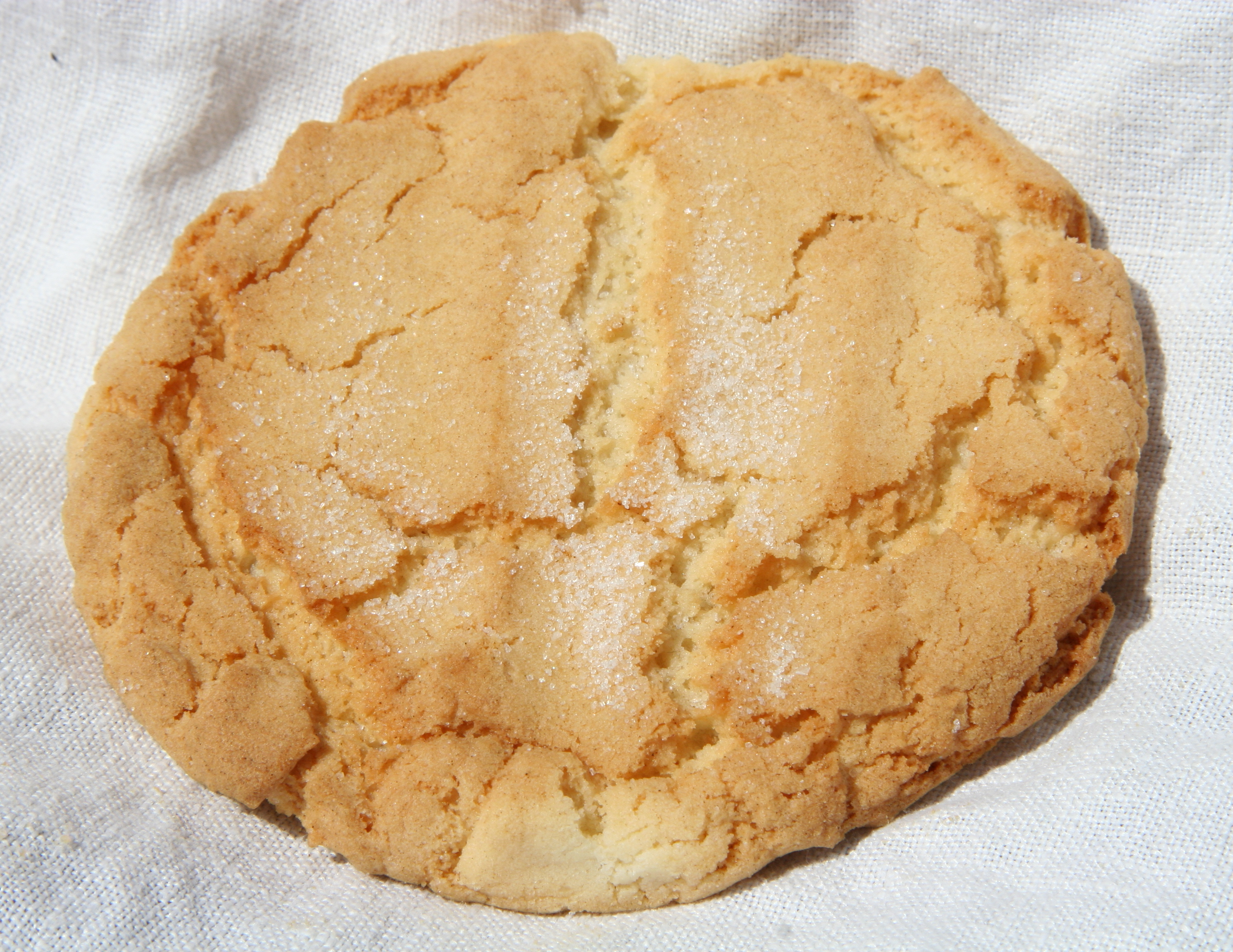
Dropped sugar cookie

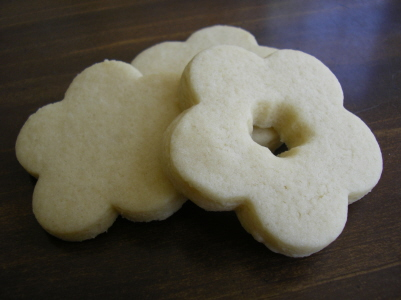
Undecorated sugar cookies, rolled out and cut into the shape of a flower

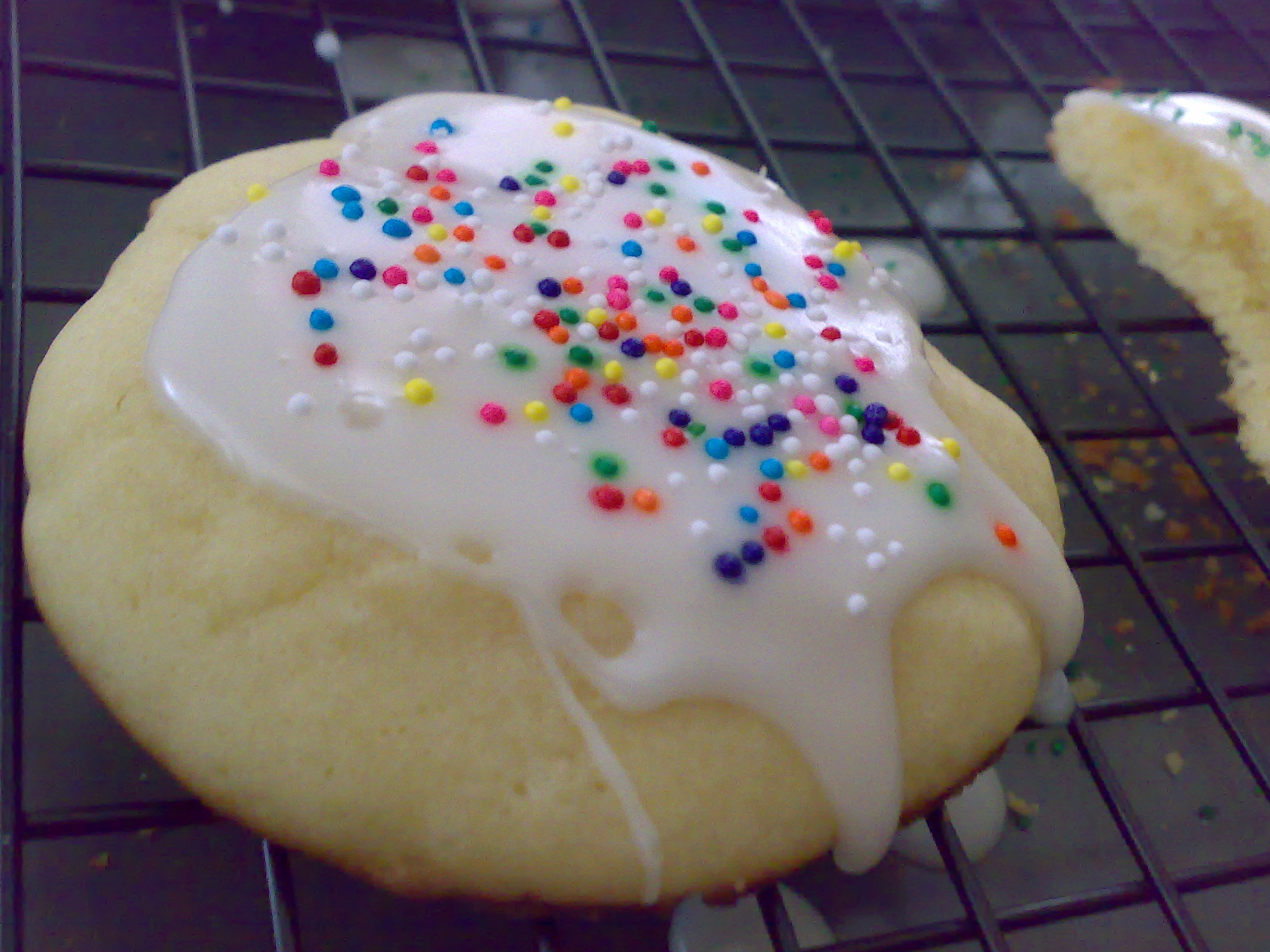
Dropped sugar cookie with a powdered sugar glaze and sprinkles

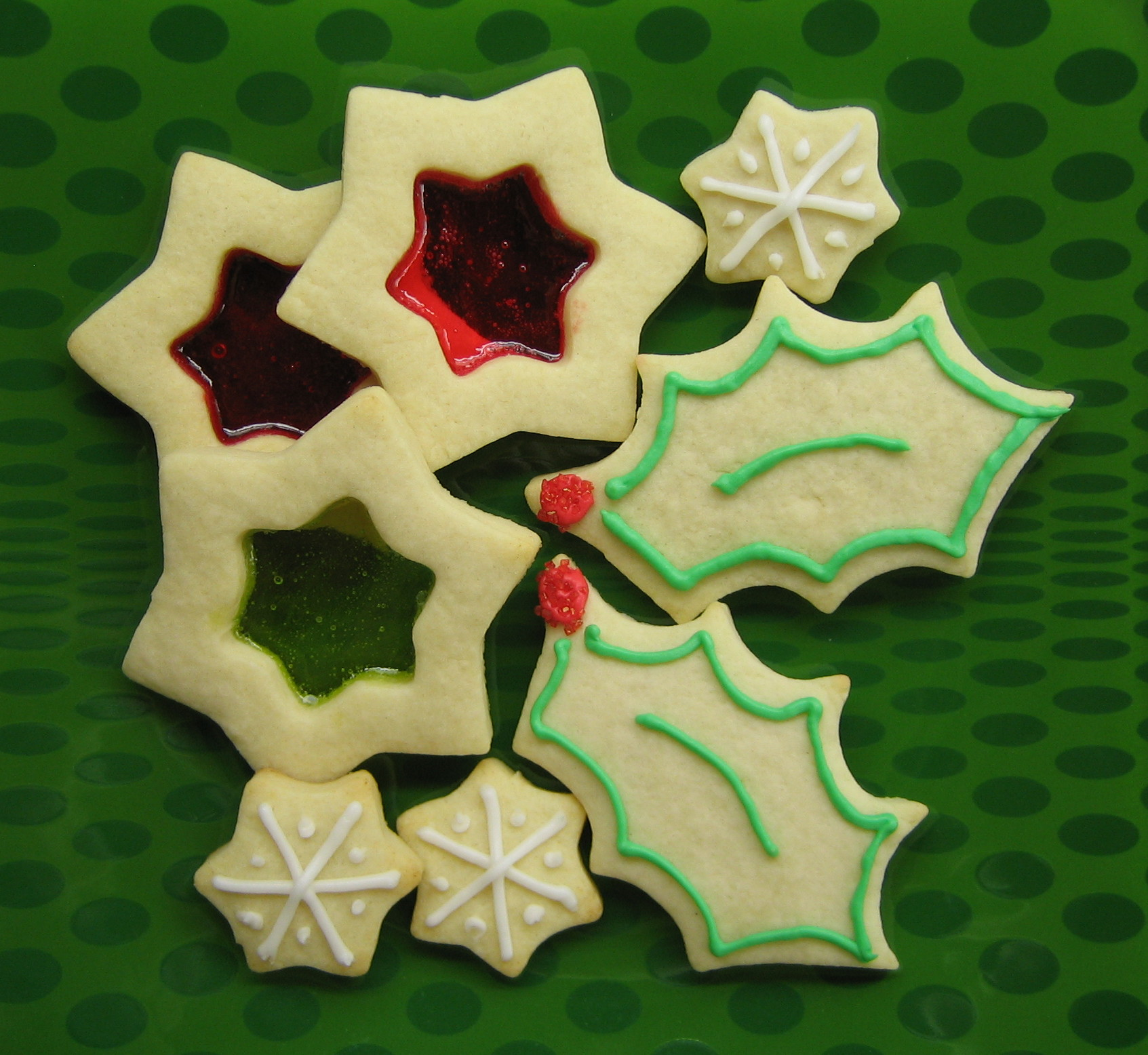
The six-pointed stars are filled with hard candy. The others are decorated with frosting.

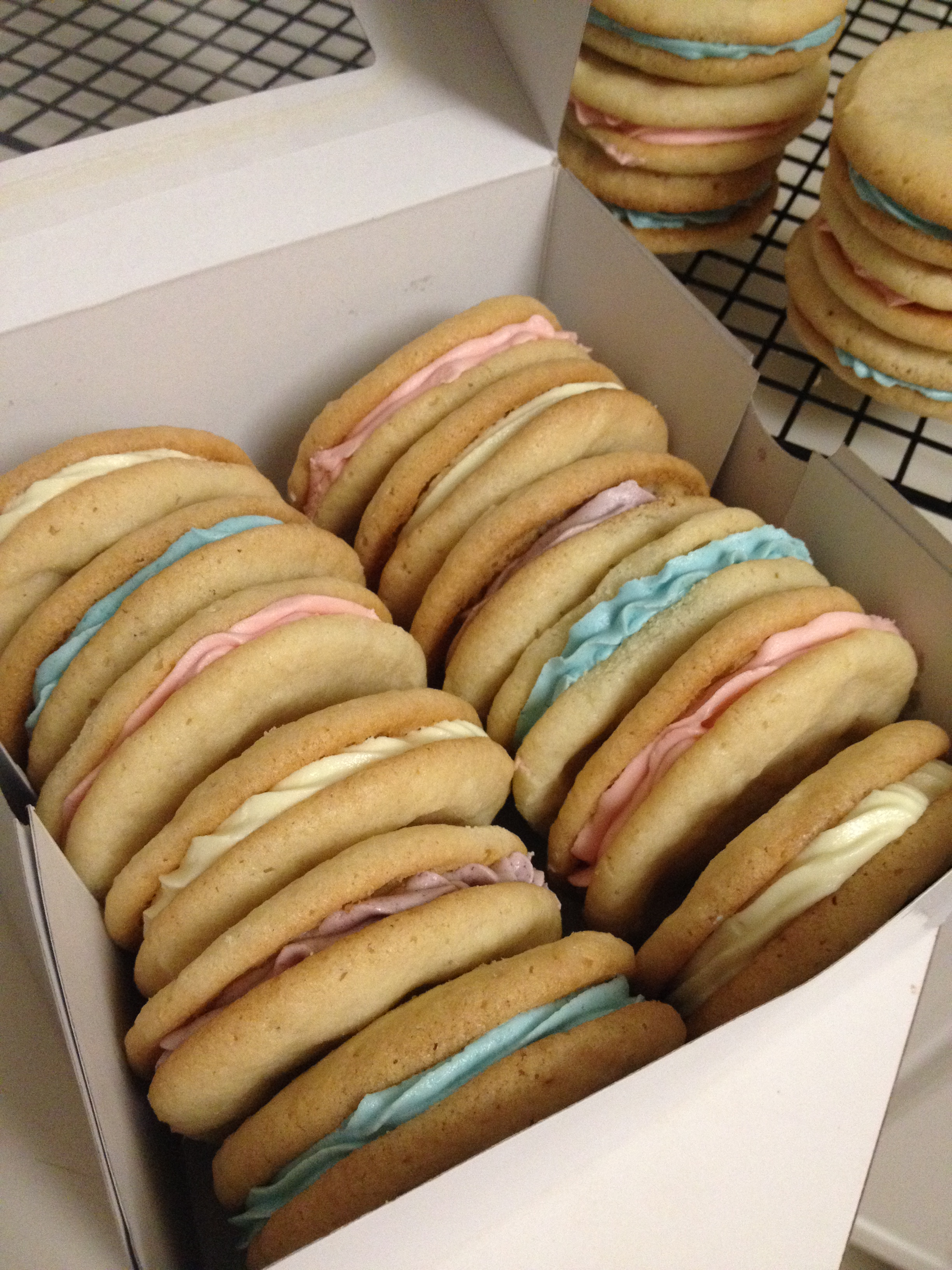
Sandwich cookies made with sugar cookies and buttercream frosting

== Shapes ==
Sugar cookies take various shapes, depending on the type of sugar cookie. When a sugar cookie is dropped, they typically are in the shape of a circle. When they are rolled, cookie cutters are often used to form the cookies into different shapes, such as hearts or animals.

== See also ==
- List of cookies
- Corn cookie
- Sandies
- Shortbread
- Snickerdoodle
