= Linga (cookie) =

Filipino cookie

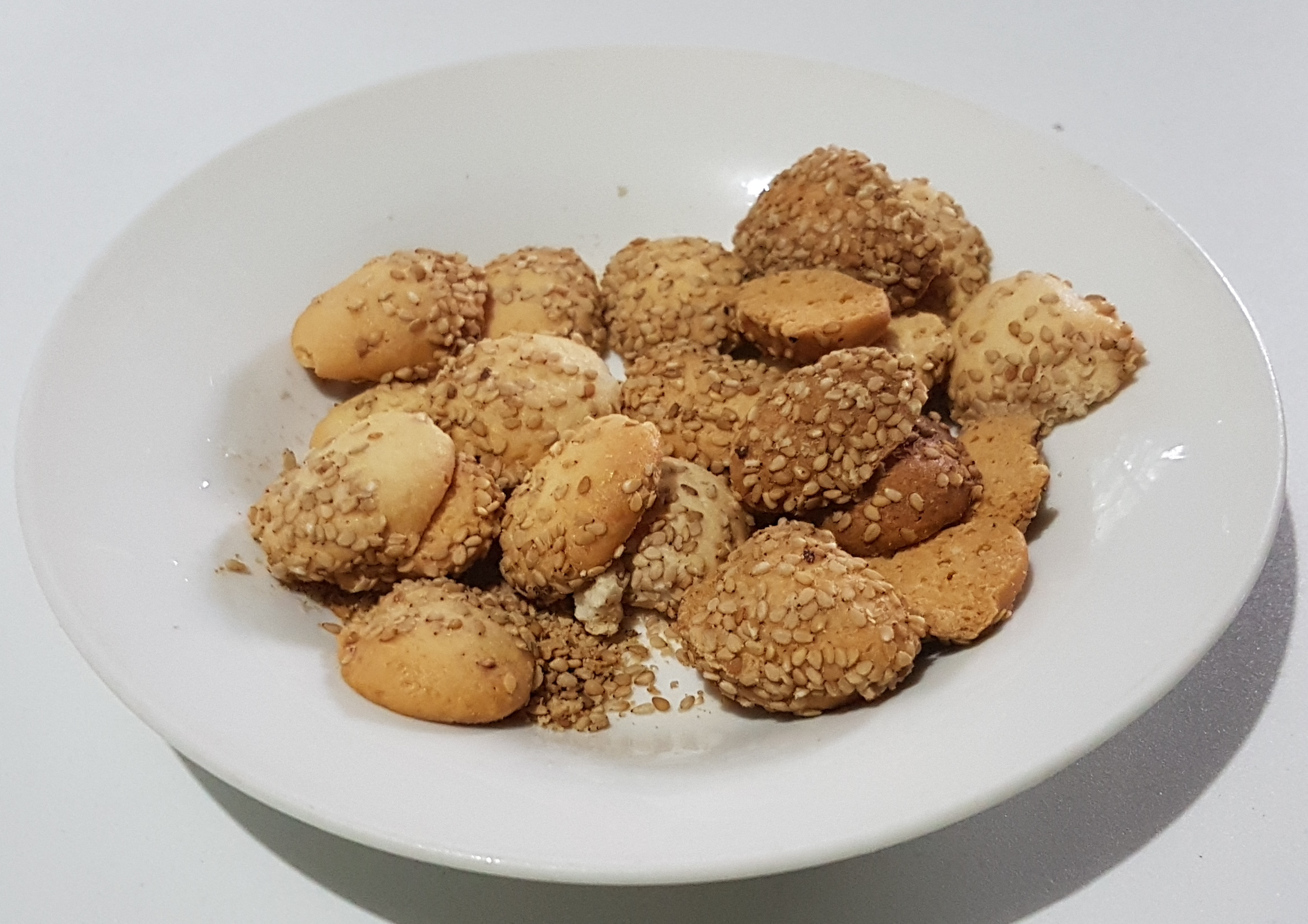
- Alternative names: Longa
- Type: Cookie
- Place of origin: Philippines
- Region or state: Davao del Sur

Linga, also known as longa, are Filipino cookies originating from Davao del Sur in the Philippines. The name comes from sesame seeds, which are known locally as linga in the Visayan languages or longa in the Davaoeño language. They are made from flour, sugar, salt, shortening, and sesame seeds. They are characteristically flat and baked until they are a deep brown color. They range in shape and size from small and circular to large and oblong. They are usually dipped in hot drinks like coffee or tsokolate before eating.

== See also ==
- Paciencia (cookie)
- Paborita
- Broas
- Galletas del Carmen
- Roscas
