= Cat tongue =

Biscuit or chocolate bar

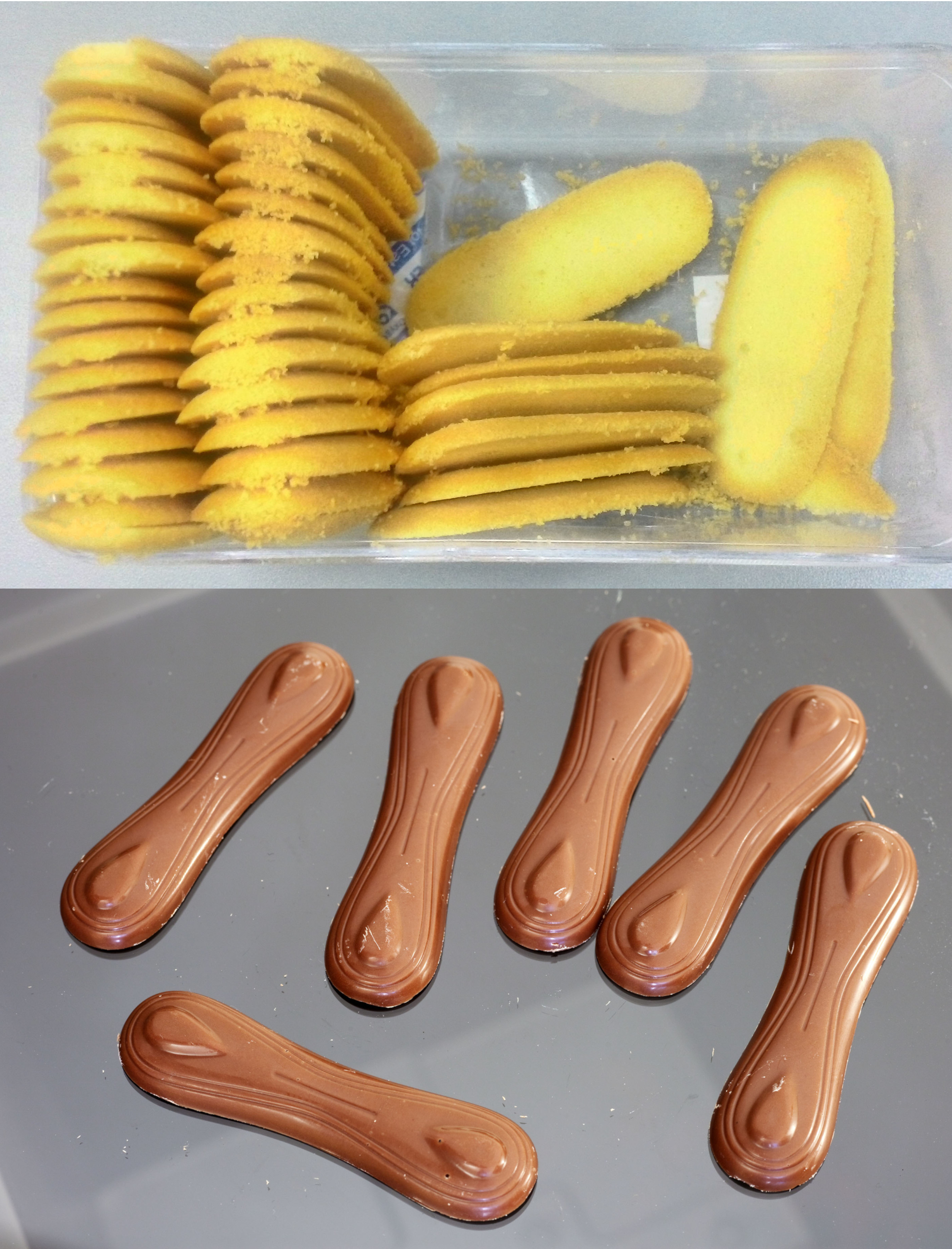
- Cat tongues: biscuits or cookies (top), milk chocolate bars (bottom).
- Alternative names: Ladyfinger
- Type: Biscuit, Cookie, or chocolate bar
- Course: Dessert
- Place of origin: France (cookies and biscuits), Austria (chocolate bars)
- Region or state: Worldwide

A cat tongue is a small biscuit or cookie or chocolate bar available in a number of European, Asian, and South American countries. The name comes from the fact that the cookies or biscuits are long and flat, somewhat like a cat's tongue.

== Cookies (biscuits) ==
Cat's tongue cookies are sweet, thin, and crunchy. The original recipe most likely comes from 17th century France. Egg white, wheat flour, sugar, butter and vanilla are common ingredients with chocolate, citrus, and spices used in some recipes. A 1922 British recipe called for 2 ounces (57 g) each of white sugar and pastry flour, "mixed together with fresh cream and a little milk well flavored with vanilla pod added" piped onto a greased baking sheet in lines "narrow as a little finger, but splaying into a heavy thumb at either end," baked in a "hot oven for five to 10 minutes.

In European cuisine they are prepared with a ganache, cream or jam filling, and sandwiched together. They are sometimes dipped in chocolate as part of their preparation. In France, the cookie is often served with sorbet or ice cream. In the Canary Islands, cat's tongue cookies are served with bienmesabe, a dessert dish.

A cat's tongue mold pan may be used in their preparation, in which cookie dough is placed and then baked. In French, this pan is known as langue-de-chat. This pan is also used in the preparation of ladyfingers and éclairs. The mold is also referred to as a cat's tongue plaque.

In Japan, langue de chat (ラング・ド・シャ, rangu do sha) are often circular or square and are ingredients in such confections as Shiroi Koibito.

They are known locally as kočičí jazýčky (Czech), Kattentong (Dutch), kocie języczki (Polish), langue de chat (French), Katzenzungen (German), lingua di gatto (Italian), língua de gato (Portuguese), lengua de gato (Spanish), macskanyelv (Hungarian), limbă de pisică (Romanian), lengua de gato (Philippines), or lidah kucing (Indonesian).

== Chocolate bars ==
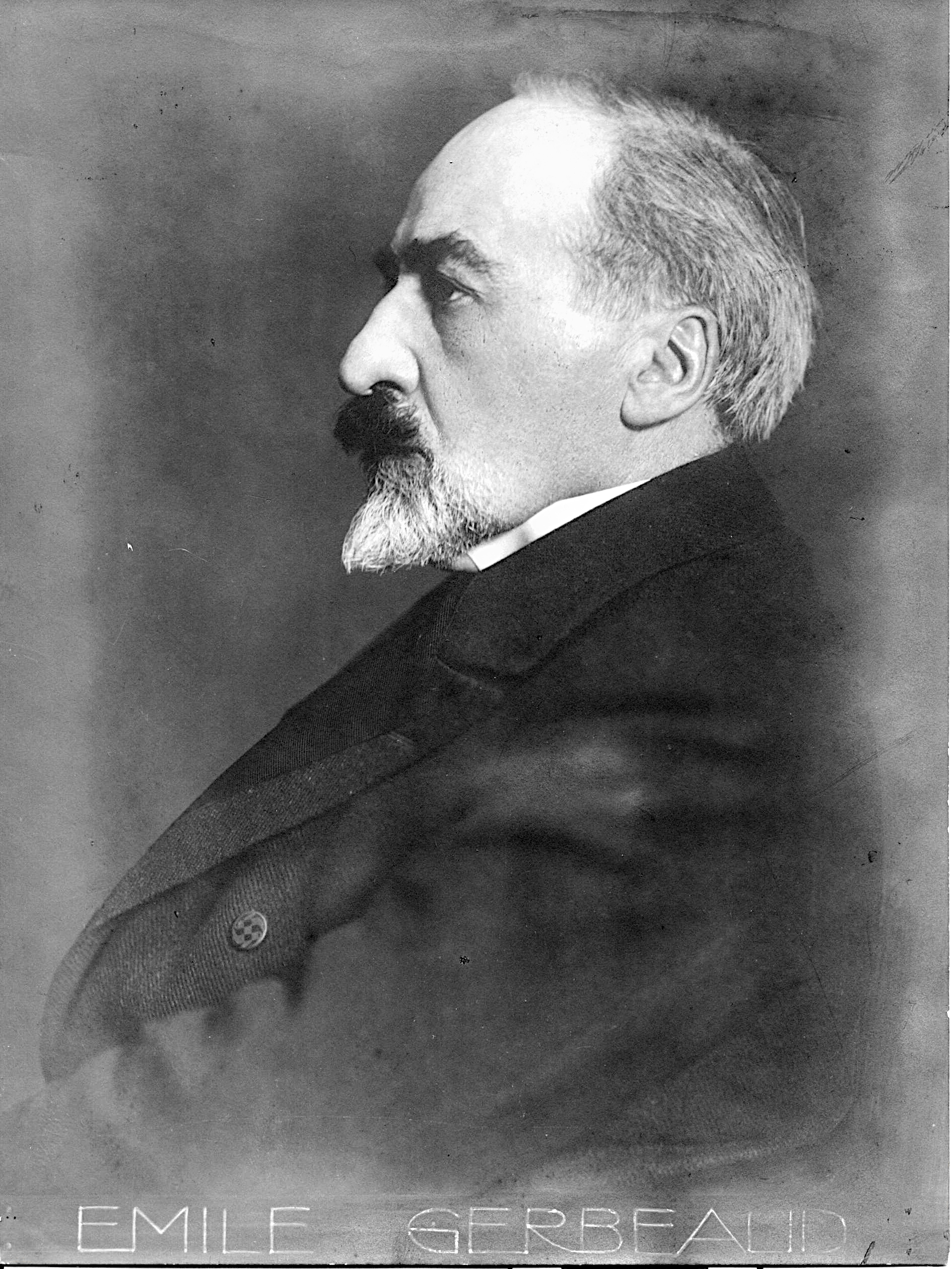
Emil Gerbeaud, inventor of the Cat tongue chocolate.

They are produced from milk chocolate, dark chocolate and white chocolate.

The first cat tongue (Macskanyelv) was made in Budapest by the Swiss-born Hungarian patissier Emil Gerbeaud in the late 1880s. The delicacy is still produced by Szerencsi and other companies such as Sweetness and Szamos. It is considered an authentic Hungarian sweet.

== See also ==
- Apas
- Broas
- Camachile cookie
- Kue lidah kucing
- Ladyfingers – biscuits shaped like large fingers
- List of cookies
- Milano (cookie)
- Paciencia cookie
- Roscas
- Rosquillo
