= Jacobina (food) =

Filipino biscuits

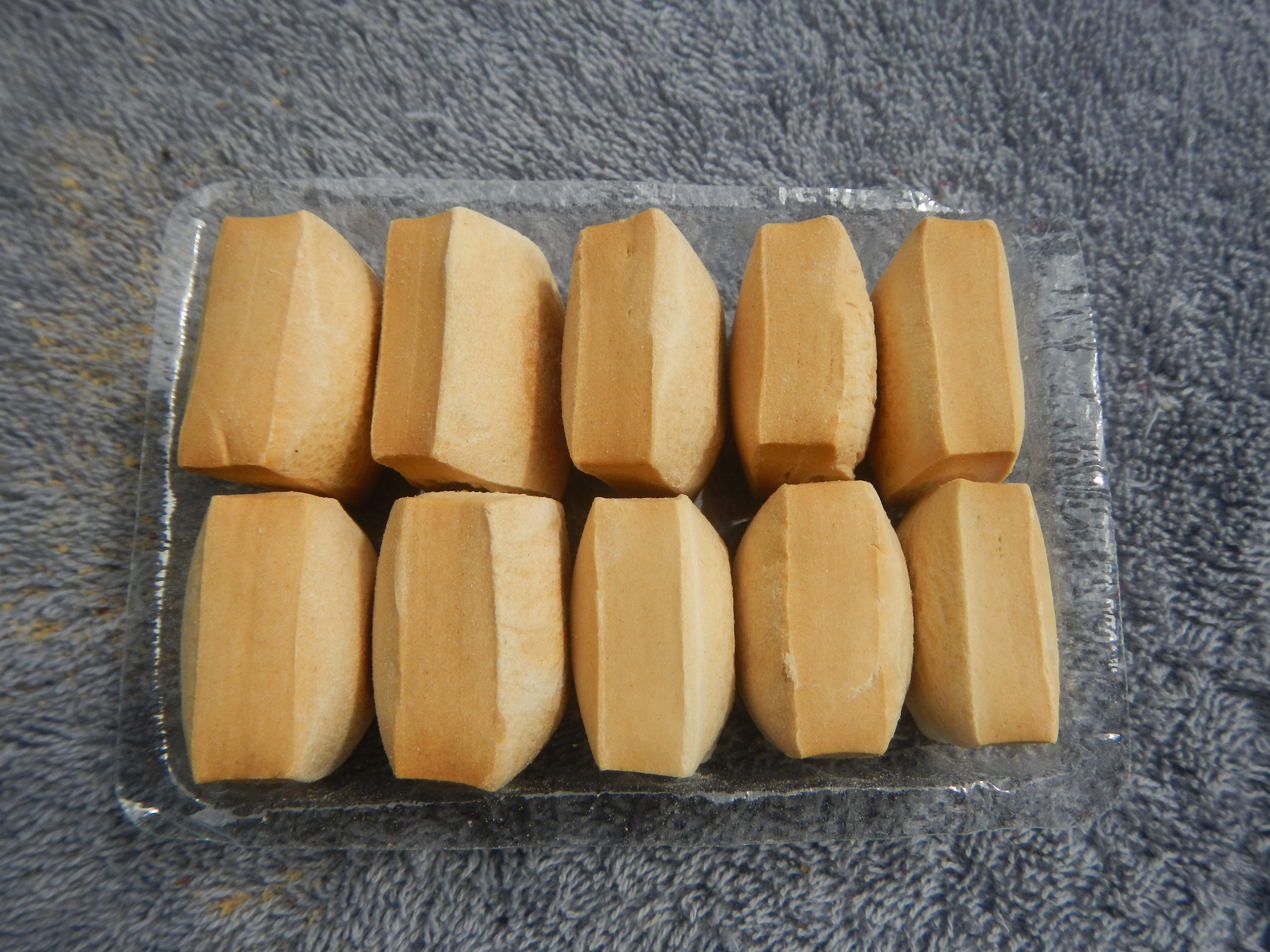
- Type: Biscuit
- Place of origin: Philippines

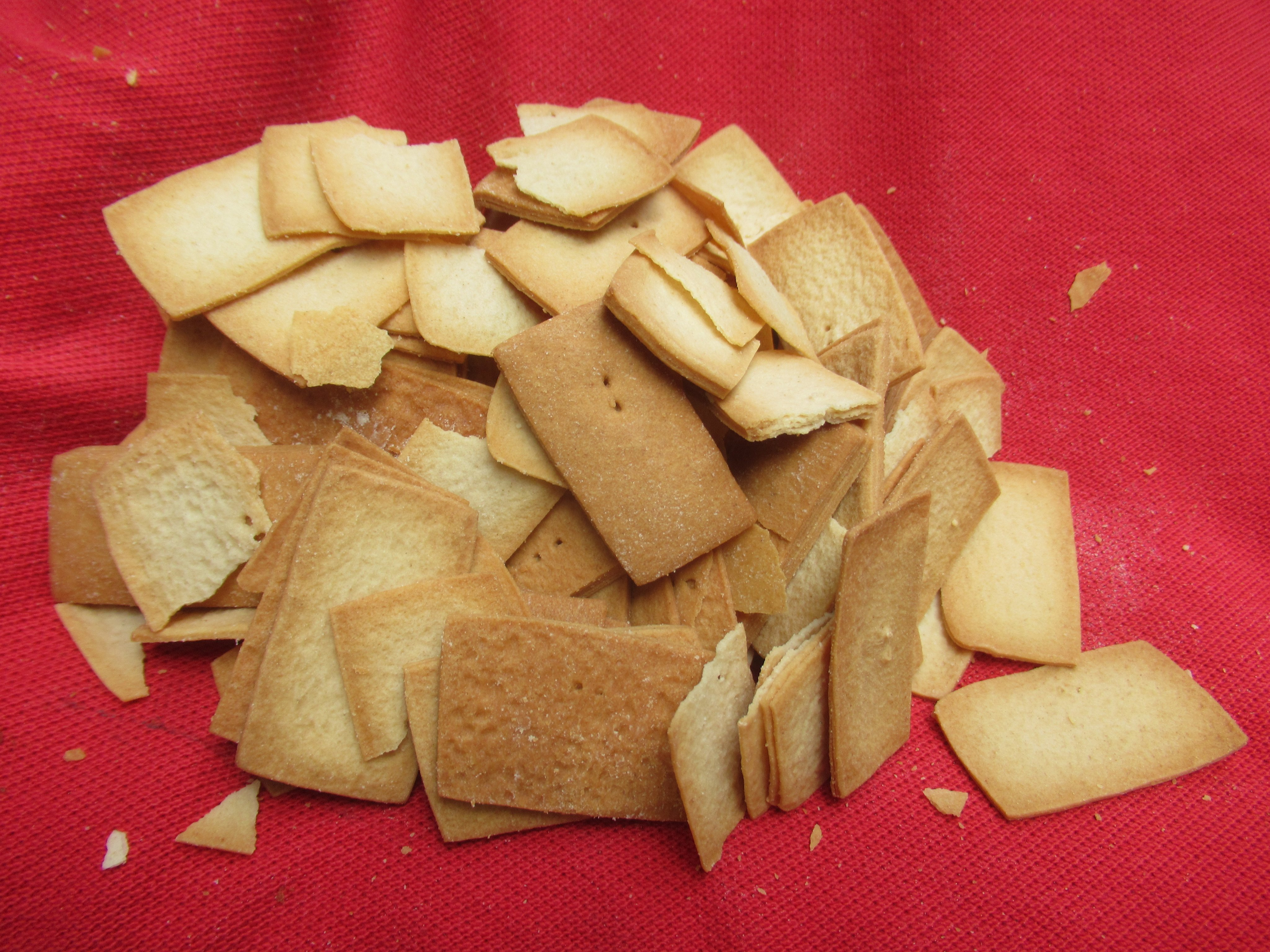
68-year old "Pantoja Bakery" Jacobina

Jacobinas are Filipino biscuits. They are distinctively cubical in shape, resembling a thicker galletas de patatas. The square biscuit was first produced by the Noceda Bakery in 1947 at 78 Gen. Luna Street, Mendez, Cavite by Paterno Noceda, and JACOBINA was registered with the Intellectual Property Office of the Philippines in 1955. In 1975, La Noceda Food Products, Inc. was incorporated to produce the famous biscuits. The biscuits are sold by the Noceda bakery in the Philippines and by the Jacobina corporation in the United States and other Asian countries. Jacobinas are traditionally eaten paired with coffee for breakfast.

In 1950, the famous Jacobina had also been baked by the original 68-year old Panaderia Pantojay. Celinda Laurel Dimayuga (Tanauan) and Aurelio Maningat Pantoja (Balayan) used a "pugon" (clay brick oven). Spouses Arturo Dimayuga Pantoia and Marilyn Gonzales managed the bakery and mechanized it in 1970. Located in Sixto Castillo Street, Barangay Poblacion 2, Tanauan, Batangas, the heritage bakery is famous for its square and crisp Jacobina crafted from paper-thin sheets of dough.

== See also ==
- Broas
- Galletas de patatas
- Galletas del Carmen
- Roscas
