= Ugoy-ugoy =

Filipino biscuits

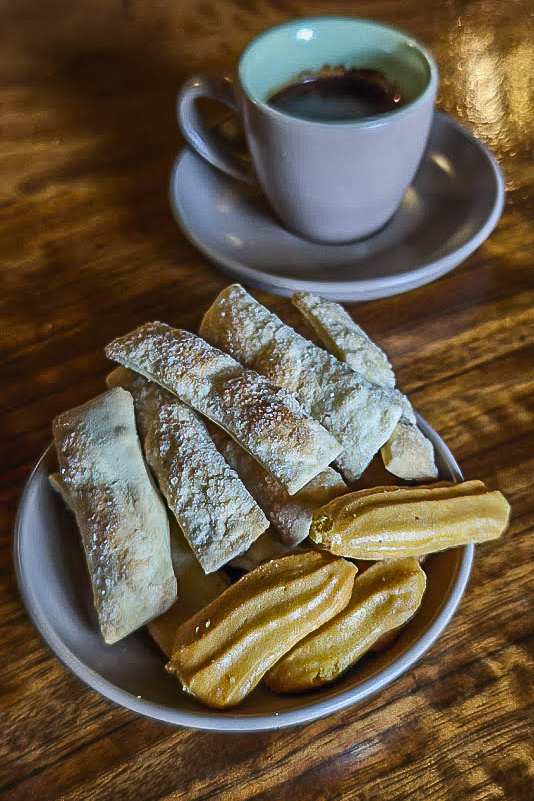
- Alternative names: Ogoy-ogoy
- Type: Biscuit
- Place of origin: Philippines

Ugoy-ugoy, also spelled ogoy-ogoy, are Filipino layered biscuits. They are typically rectangular or ribbon-like in shape and are topped with granulated sugar. It is particularly associated with the city of Iloilo.

== See also ==
- Paborita
- Galletas de patatas
