= Galletas pesquera =

Filipino biscuit

- Alternative names: Galyetas, Galletas de Bacolod
- Type: Biscuit
- Place of origin: Philippines
- Region or state: Tagalog and Ilonggo

Galletas pesquera, often simply called galletas or galyetas, are Filipino biscuits. They are characteristically very thin and disc-shaped, usually with three or more small perforations. They are popular in Tagalog and Ilonggo regions.

== See also ==
- Broas
- Galletas de patatas
- Galletas del Carmen
- Roscas
