= Paciencia (cookie) =

Famous cookie in the Philippines

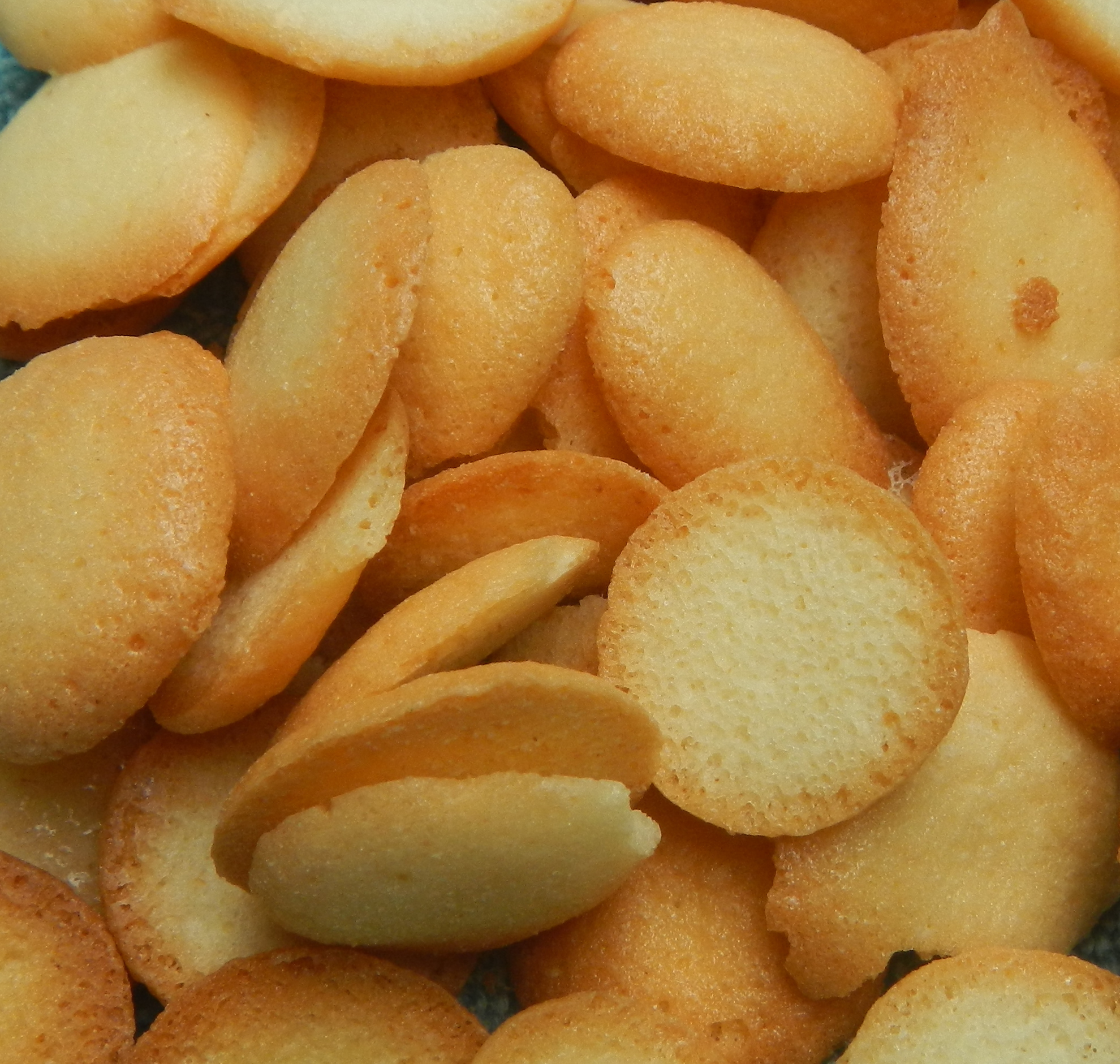
- Alternative names: galletas paciencia, Filipino meringue cookies, Filipino eggdrop cookies, Filipino eggnog cookies, pacencia
- Type: Cookie
- Place of origin: Philippines

Paciencia, also known as Filipino meringue galyetas or galletas paciencia, are Filipino cookies made with beaten egg whites, flour, and calamansi. They are typically a smooth flattened hemispherical shape. Paciencia means "patience" in Spanish, from which the Tagalog word for "patience" (pasensya) and, consequently, an alternative name for the cookie (pacencia) derives. The cookies are traditionally eaten during the Christmas Season.

== See also ==
- Linga cookie
- Broas
- Christmas cookie
- List of cookies
- Monde Nissin
- Roscas
- Rosquillo
