= Paborita =

Filipino disc-shaped biscuits

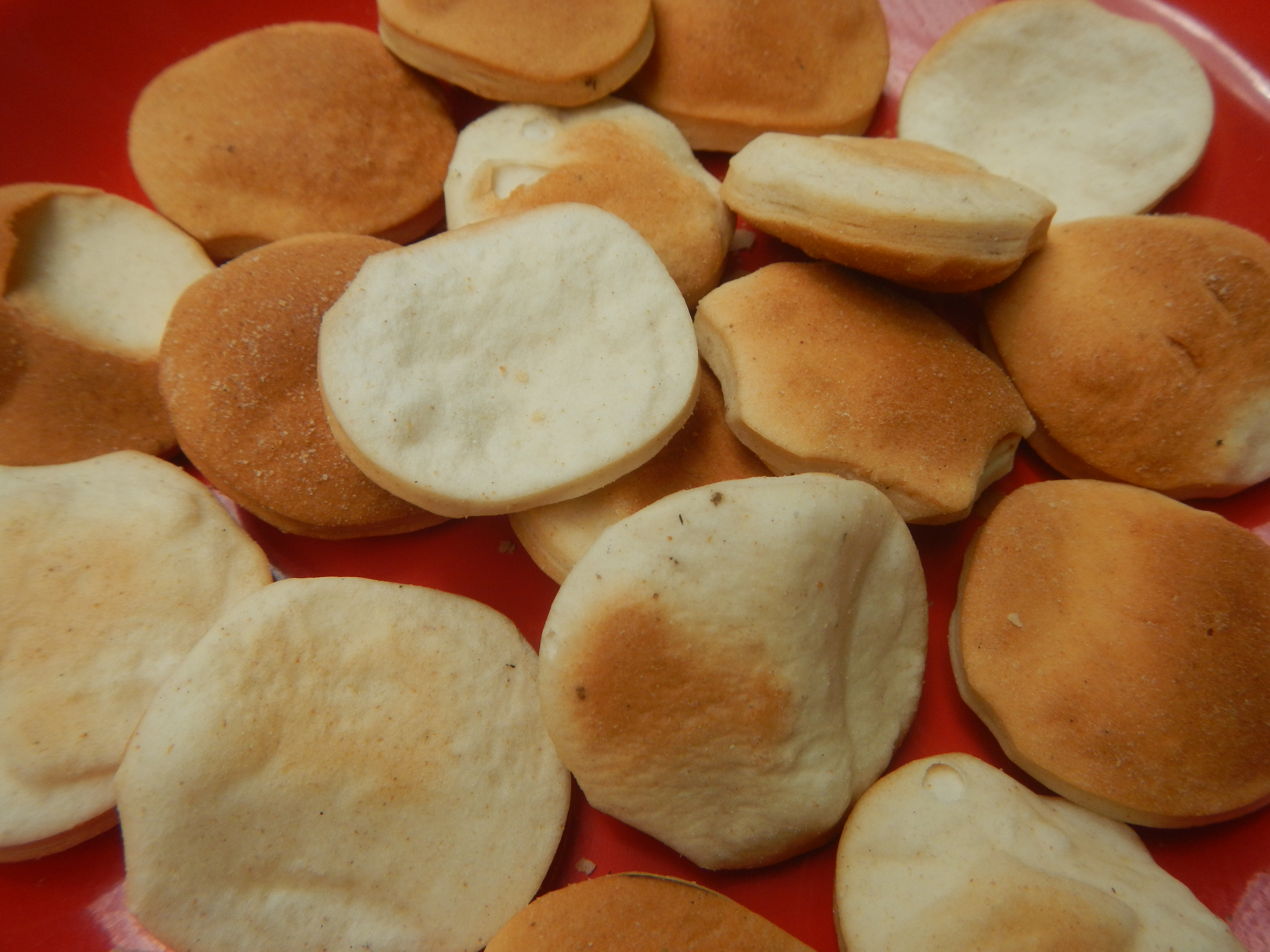
- Type: Biscuit
- Place of origin: Philippines

Paborita are Filipino disc-shaped biscuits with a flaky texture. They are made with wheat flour, sugar, skim milk, salt, baking powder, alum, and cooking oil. They are very similar in taste to galletas de patatas. They are traditionally eaten paired with hot drinks or with fruit preserves.

== See also ==
- Galletas de patatas
- Broas
- Galletas del Carmen
- Roscas
