= Bienmesabe =

Spanish dessert

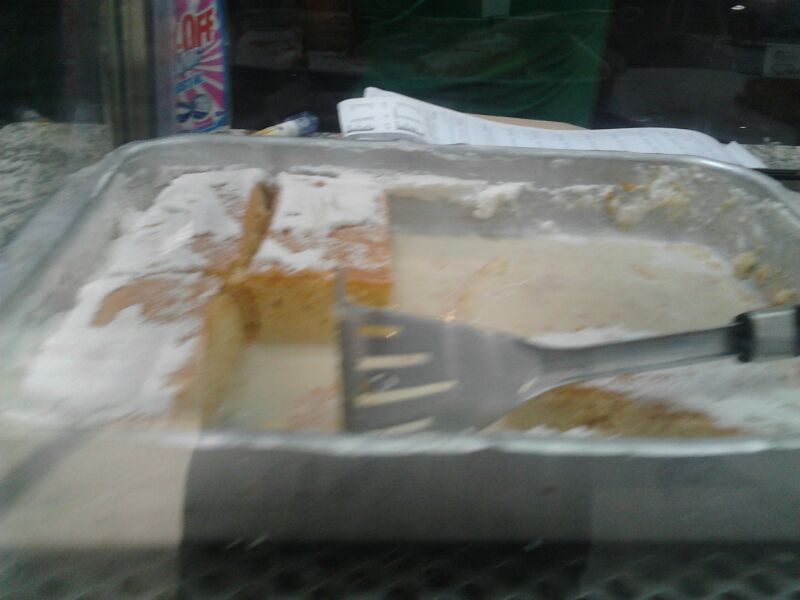
- Bienmesabe with coconut
- Region or state: Spain
- Main ingredients: honey, egg yolk, ground almonds

Bienmesabe (Spanish: "it tastes good to me") is a sweet Spanish dessert prepared with honey, egg yolk, and ground almonds as primary ingredients. Its consistency significantly varies depending upon preparation methods used. The dessert is also popular in the cuisine of the Canary Islands. It has been described as influenced by Moorish cuisine. Several variations of the dessert exist.

== Overview ==
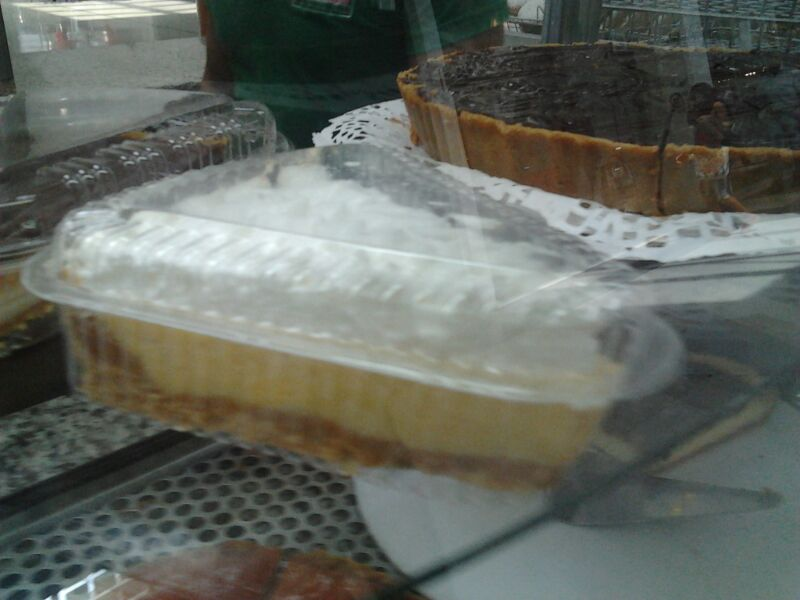
Homemade bienmesabe

Honey, egg yolk and ground almonds are primary ingredients in the preparation of bienmesabe, and some versions are prepared using sugar. Additional ingredients may include lemon zest, cinnamon and sweet wine or sherry.

Bienmesabe's consistency varies greatly depending upon preparation methods, and can vary from the consistency of a sticky sauce thick cream or meringue to a custard or cake. Well-chilled versions may have a toffee-like consistency. As a sauce, bienmesabe is sometimes served poured over ice cream.

=== Canary Islands ===
Bienmesabe is a popular dessert in the cuisine of the Canary Islands, where it is served with cat's tongue cookies. The cookies may be served on the side or crushed and served atop the dessert. On the Canary Islands, the dish may also include rum. It has been described as the "most famous" dessert in Canarian cuisine.

== History ==
Bienmesabe a traditional Spanish dessert has been described as being influenced by the cuisine of the Moors.

== Variations ==
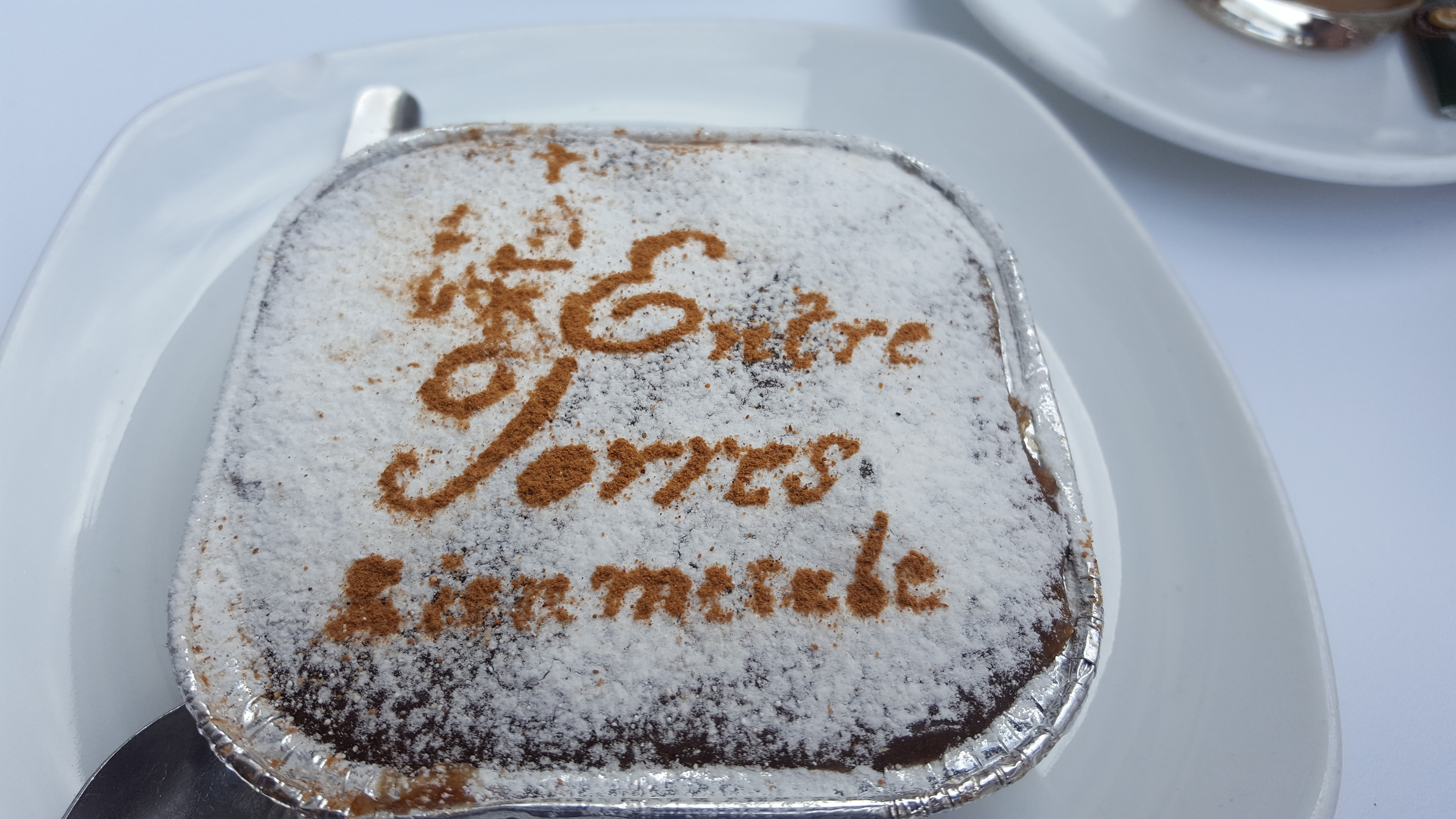
Bienmesabe antequerano

=== Panama ===
In Panamanian cuisine, bienmesabe is a dessert dish prepared using milk, rice and panela (unrefined whole cane sugar), which is slow cooked.

=== Puerto Rico ===
In Puerto Rican cuisine, bienmesabe is a sweet syrup prepared using coconut milk, egg yolk, rum and sugar. It is used poured atop dishes such as ladyfingers or sponge cake.

=== Peru ===
In Peru, bienmesabe is a sweet that has been present since the 19th century. The variety that has become popular is the one that is prepared in Lima and has sweet potato as a basic ingredient. There are other variants that incorporate traditional elements of regional cuisines, such as loche, custard apple or lucuma in Lambayeque.

=== Spain ===
Bienmesabe antequerano is prepared in a marzipan cake form, which has a soft texture and is topped with sugar.

Bienmesabe is a popular dessert in the cuisine of the Canary Islands, where it is served with cat's tongue biscuits. Cookies can be served on the side or crushed and served over dessert. It has been described as the "most famous" dessert in Canarian cuisine.

Its origin dates back to the European era of the conquest of the islands (in the fifteenth century), brought by Spanish settlers, who in turn respond to Arab traditions spread in Spain during the Muslim occupation over seven centuries. The Canarian bienmesabe is made of egg, grated almonds, palm honey and grated lemon. It has a thick, grainy and unctuous texture. It can be eaten alone or with other foods, such as ice cream. You can also include rum.

=== Venezuela ===
In Venezuelan cuisine, bienmesabe is a traditional cake prepared using coconut and liqueur. A sweet sponge cake version that is soaked in a mixture of egg yolks and coconut milk exists as well.

== See also ==
- List of desserts
