= The Afternoon Meal (Luis Meléndez) =

Painting by Luis Meléndez

- La Merienda (Spanish)
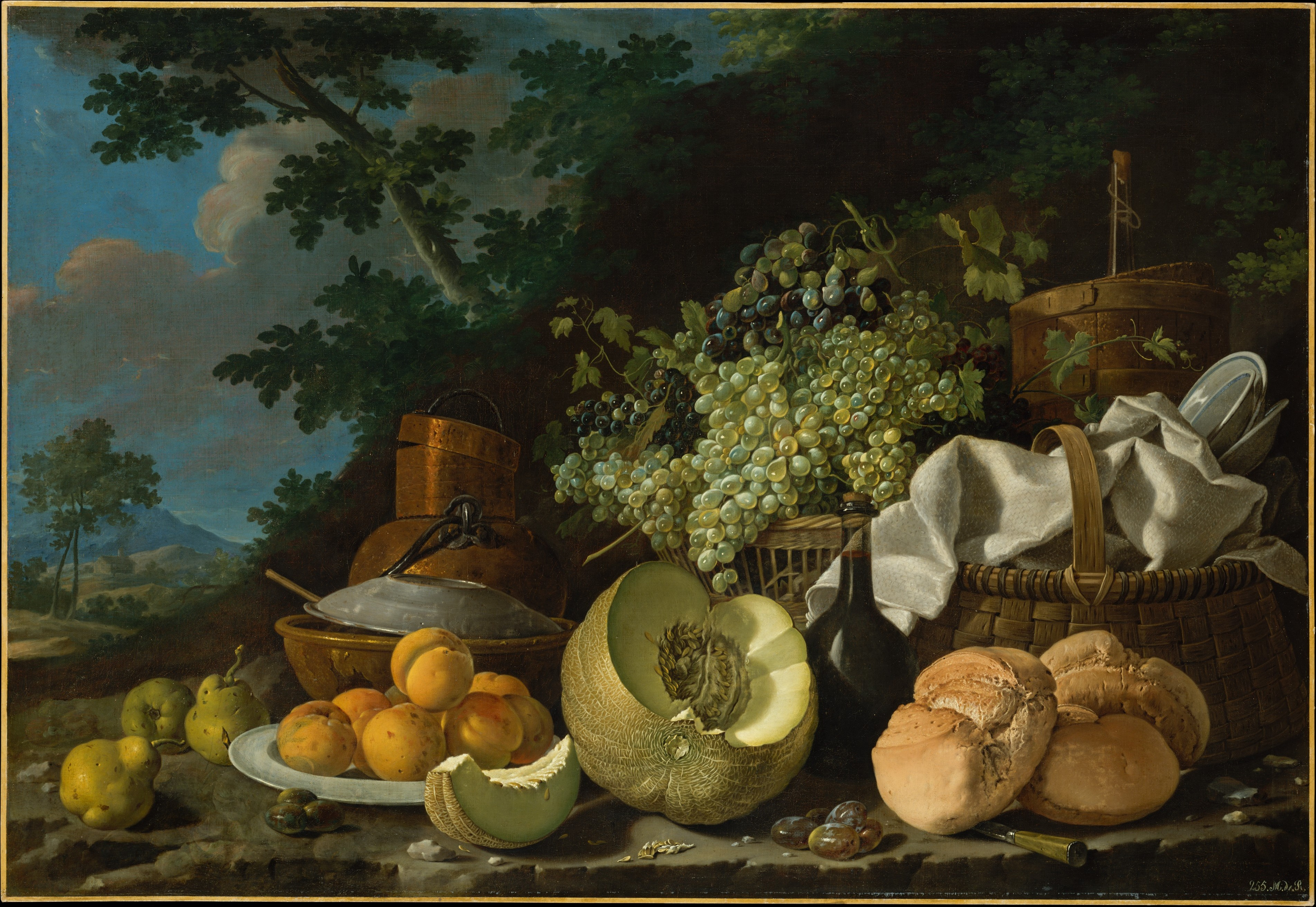
- Artist: Luis Egidio Meléndez
- Year: c. 1772
- Medium: Oil on canvas
- Dimensions: 105.4 cm × 153.7 cm (41.5 in × 60.5 in)
- Location: Metropolitan Museum of Art; New York

The Afternoon Meal (in Spanish, La Merienda) is a mid-eighteenth-century still life painting by Spanish painter Luis Egidio Meléndez (1716–1780).

It was created around 1772. Done in oil on canvas, the painting depicts an assortment of fruits and bread set before a stark background.

The painting is a straight-sided ogee frame with sculpted Rococo corners and shallow-relief details, collected by the Metropolitan Museum of Art.
