= Kue lidah kucing =

Indonesian cookies

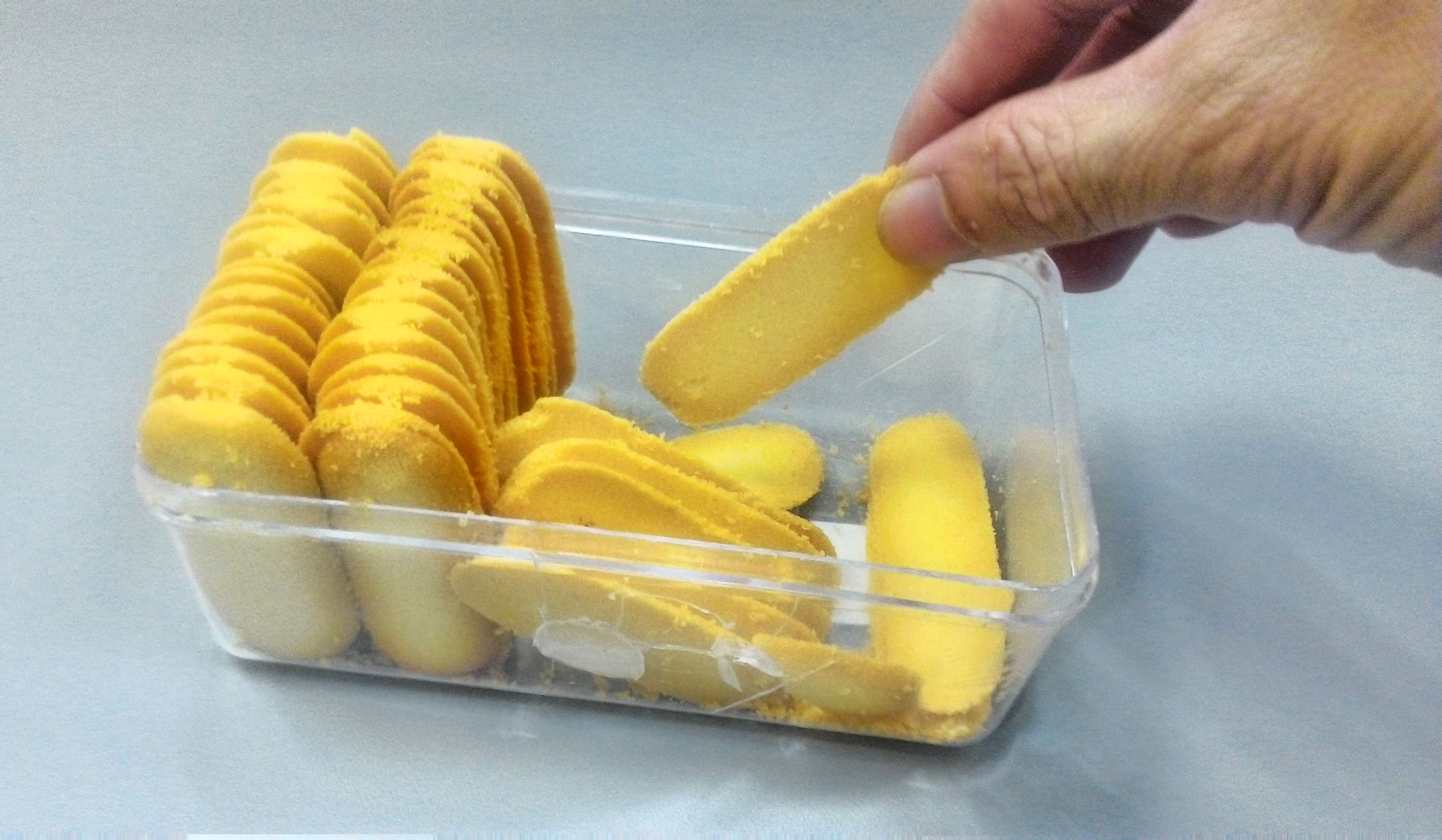
- Kue lidah kucing
- Type: Cookie
- Course: Snack, dessert
- Place of origin: Indonesia
- Region or state: Nationwide

Kue lidah kucing (lit. 'cat tongue kue') is a small Indonesian biscuit (kue kering) shaped somewhat like a cat's tongue (long and flat). They are sweet and crunchy. This cookie is a Dutch-influenced cookie due to the historical tie between Indonesia and the Netherlands. In the Netherlands, this cookie is known as kattentong, and ultimately derived from European cat tongue biscuit.

In Indonesia, kue lidah kucing is widely known. This pastry is a special dish in some Indonesian occasion such as Eid ul-Fitr, Christmas and Chinese New Year.

== See also ==
- Cat tongue
- Cookies
- Cuisine of Indonesia
- Kue
- Ladyfinger
- List of cookies
- List of Indonesian dishes
- List of Indonesian snacks
