= Galletas de patatas =

Filipino biscuits

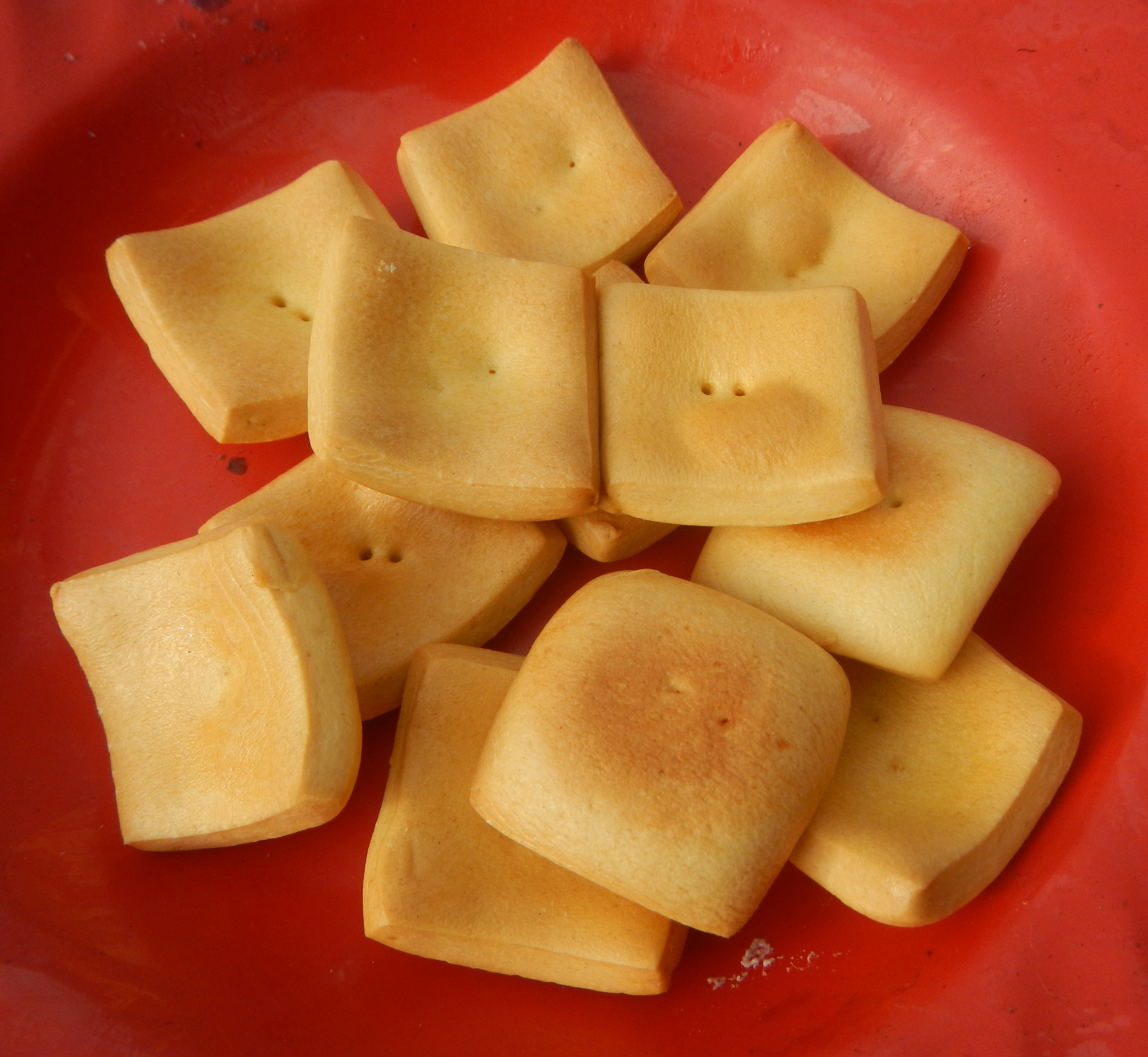
- Alternative names: egg cracklets, galletas de huevos, tengang daga, galletas, galyetas, patatas
- Type: Biscuit
- Place of origin: Philippines

Galletas de patatas (lit. "potato crackers"), commonly sold as egg cracklets, are Filipino biscuits. They are characteristically thick and square-shaped with upturned edges. The name is derived from the curving browned lower edge which resembles a potato. It is also called galletas de huevos ("egg crackers") due to the use of egg-white glazing, or tengang daga ("mouse ears") due to its shape.

== See also ==
- Galletas del Carmen
- Galletas pesquera
- Roscas
