= Rosquillo =

Filipino cookies

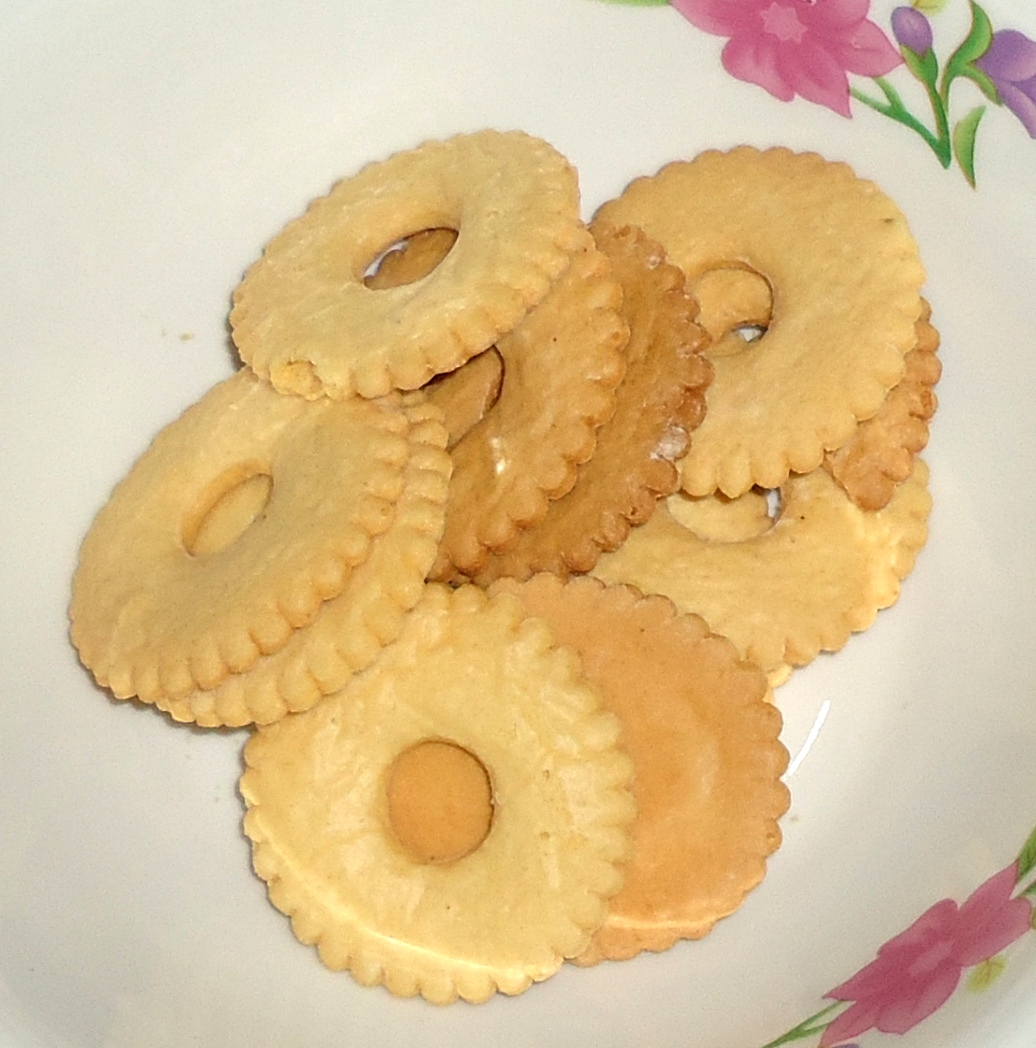
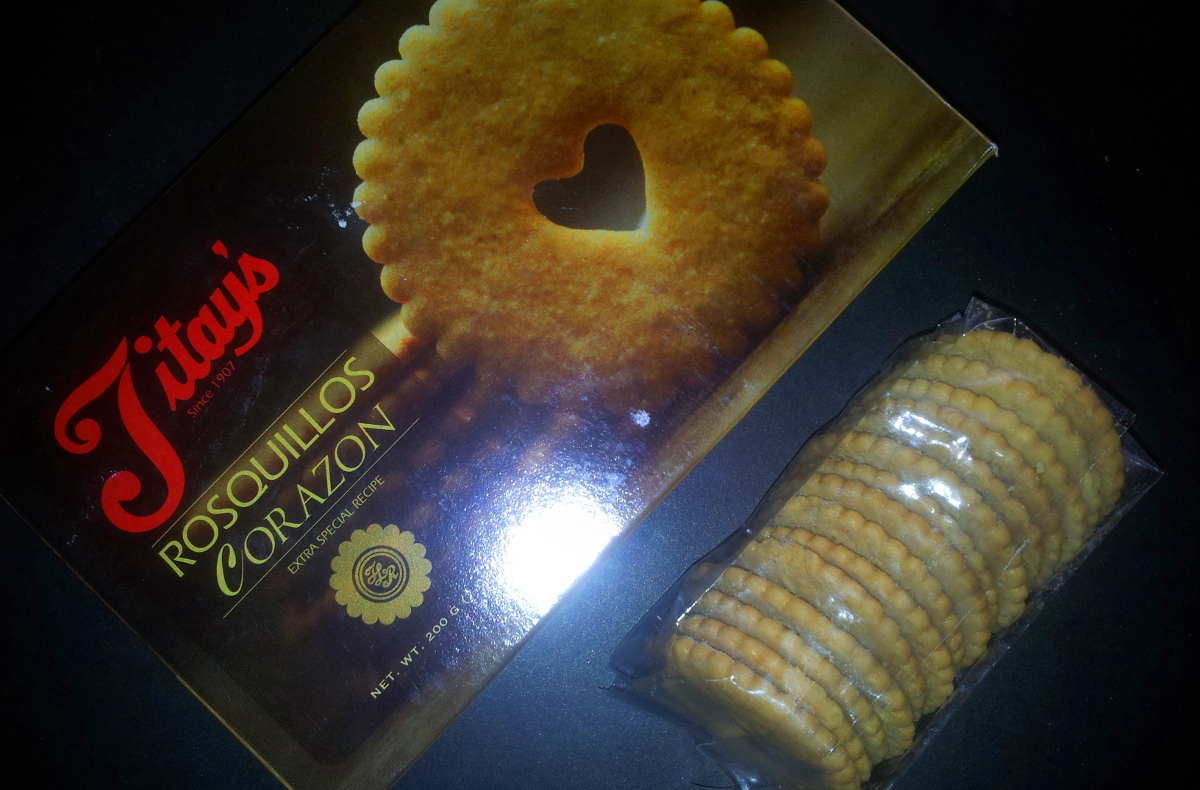
- Course: Pastries
- Place of origin: Philippines
- Region or state: Cebu
- Main ingredients: Flour, eggs, shortening, sugar, and baking powder

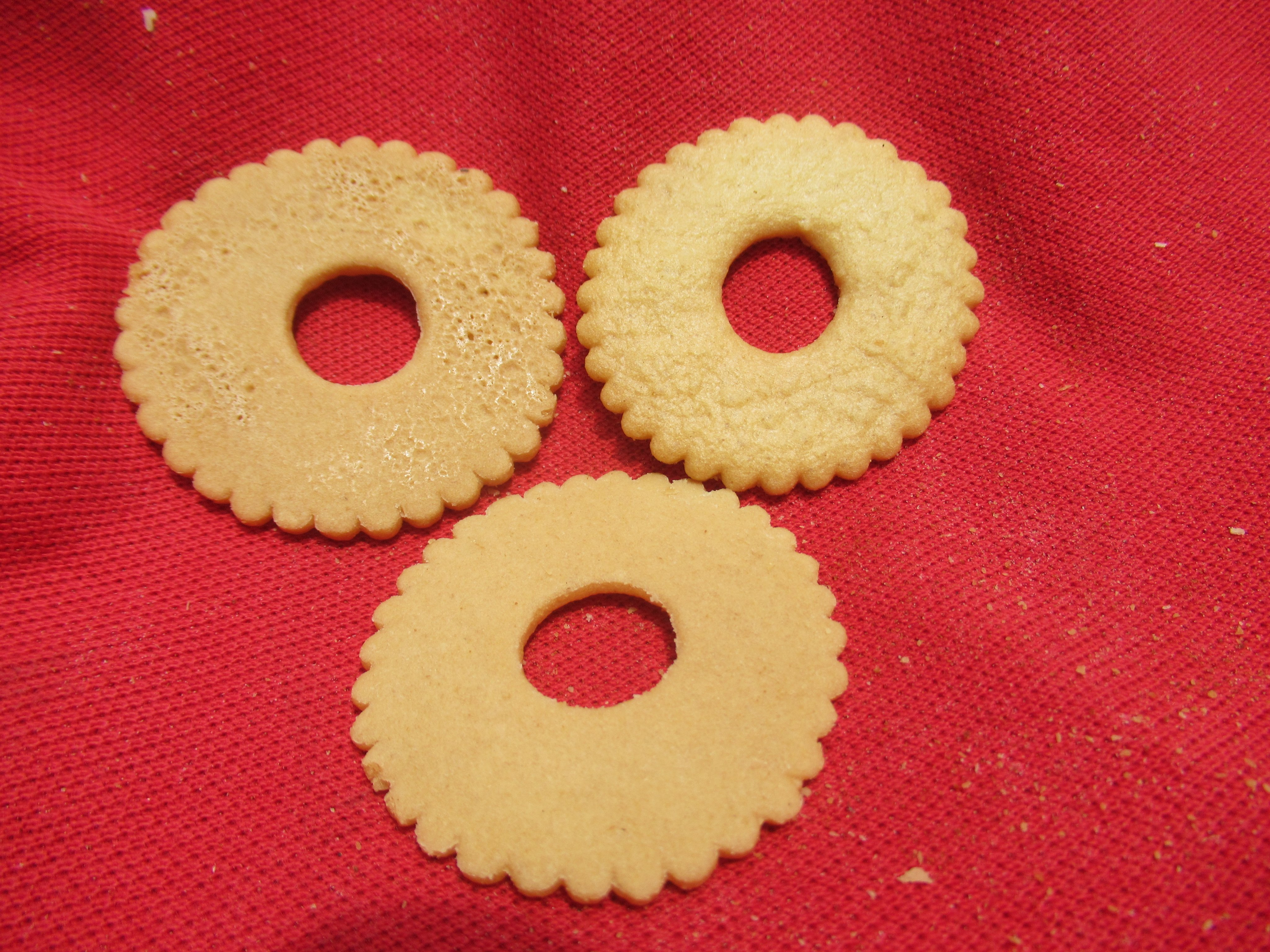
"Titay's" Rosquillos

Rosquillos are Philippine cookies made from flour, eggs, shortening, sugar, and baking powder. They were originally created by Margarita "Titay" T. Frasco in 1907 in Liloan, Cebu. The name means "ringlet" in Spanish (from rosca, "ring") and was reputedly coined by President Sergio Osmeña.

Despite sharing the name, Philippine rosquillos are not related to the Spanish rosquillos (better known as rosquillas, roscos, or rosquillos de vino), which are more akin to baked doughnuts.

There are two notable variants of rosquillos, differing in shape. The first is galletas del Carmen, which is flower-shaped and does not have a hole in the center. The other is galletas de bató (lit. "stone [mill] cracker"), which has a hole in the center but does not have a crenelated edge.

== See also ==
- Cuisine of the Philippines
- Filipinos (snack food)
- Galletas de patatas
- Galletas pesquera
- Roscas
