= Rosca =

Hispanic bread ring

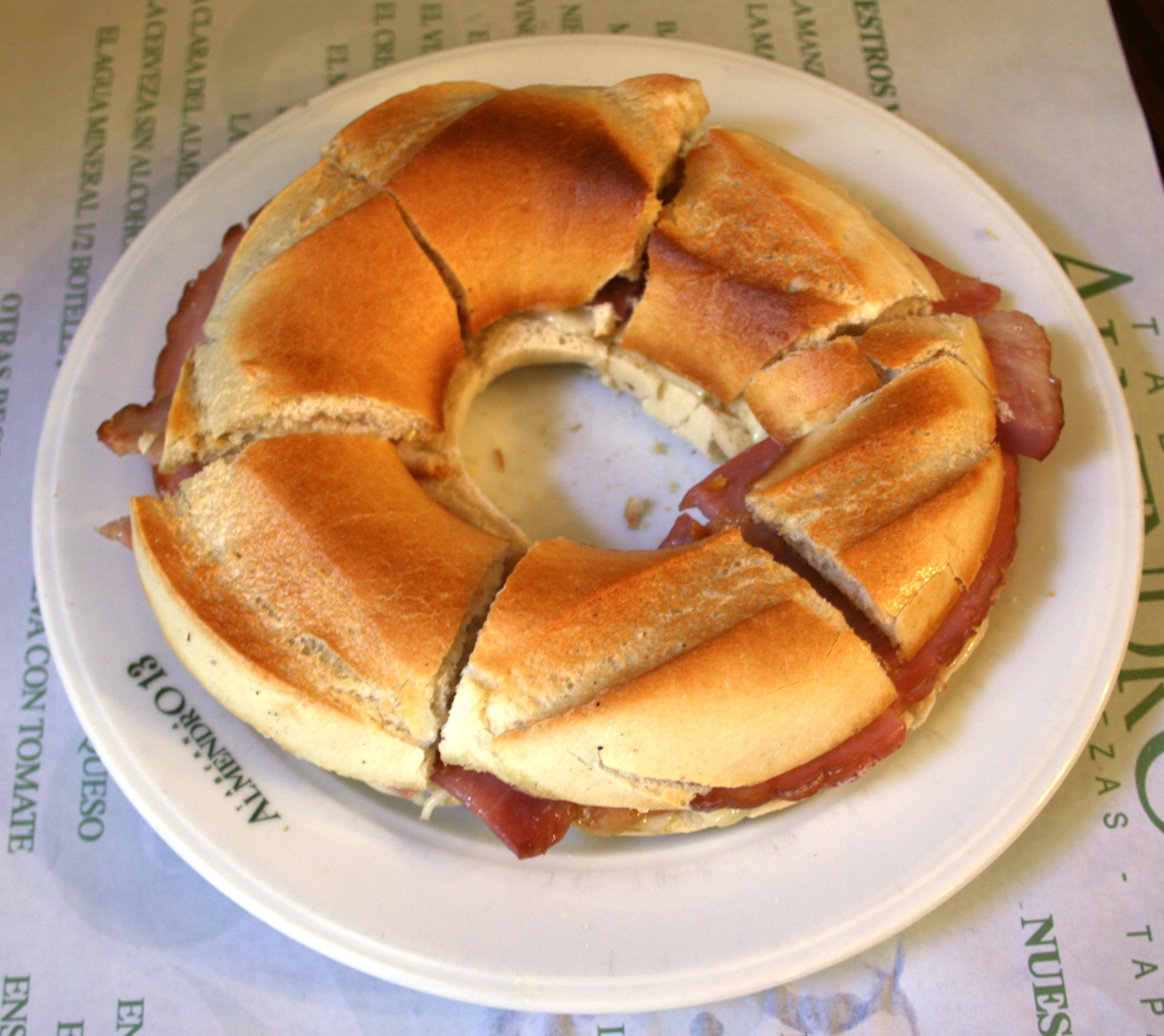
- Rosca from Madrid, Spain
- Alternative names: Ka'ake
- Type: Bread
- Region or state: Spain, Portugal, Mexico, South America, Philippines and other areas
- Created by: Spanish and Portuguese
- Main ingredients: Flour, salt, sugar, butter, yeast, water, and seasonings

Rosca or roscón (lit. 'ring') is a Hispanic bread dish eaten throughout Iberia and Latin America. It is made with flour, salt, sugar, butter, yeast, water, and seasonings. It is also called ka'ake and referred to as a "Syrian-style cracker ring".

== Gallery ==
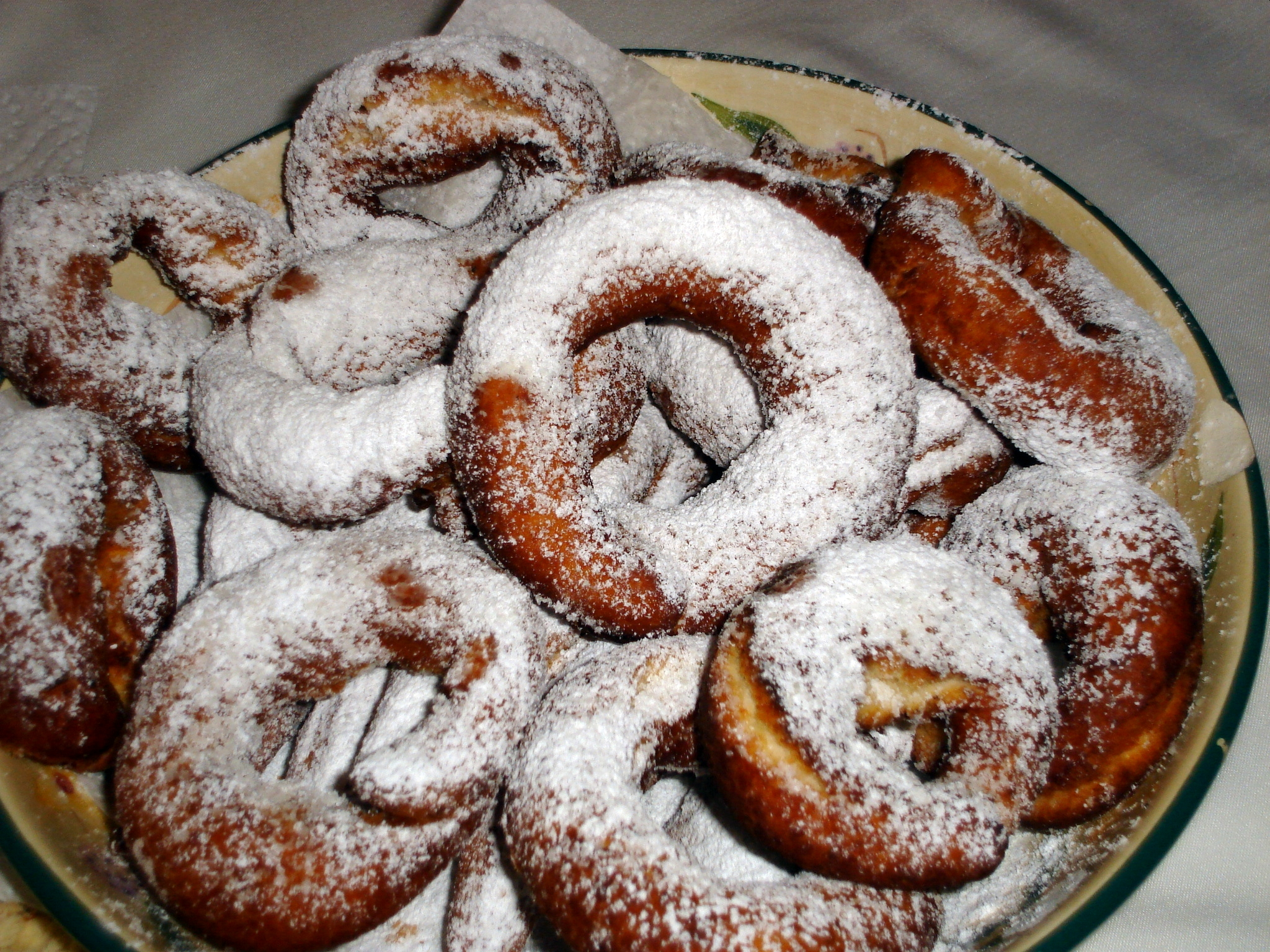
Roscas of Chile

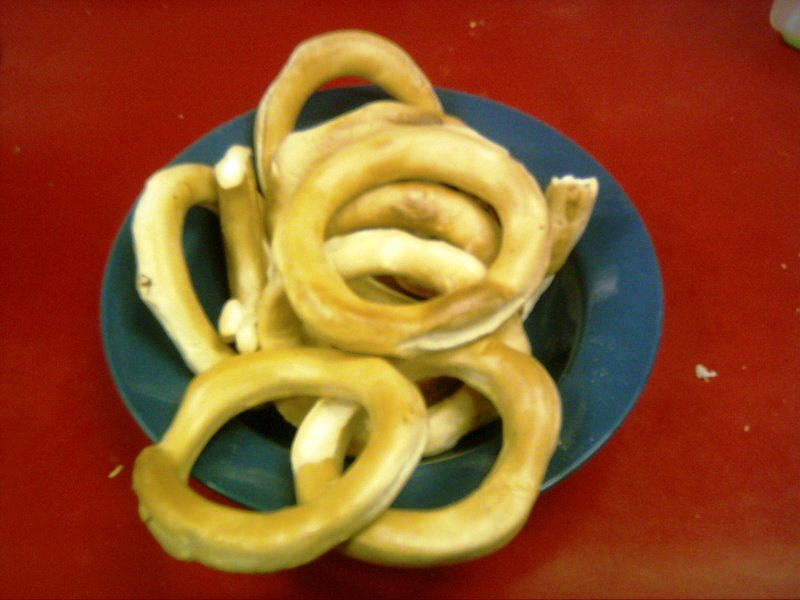
Roscas "chonchinas" from Chonchi (Chiloé, Chile)

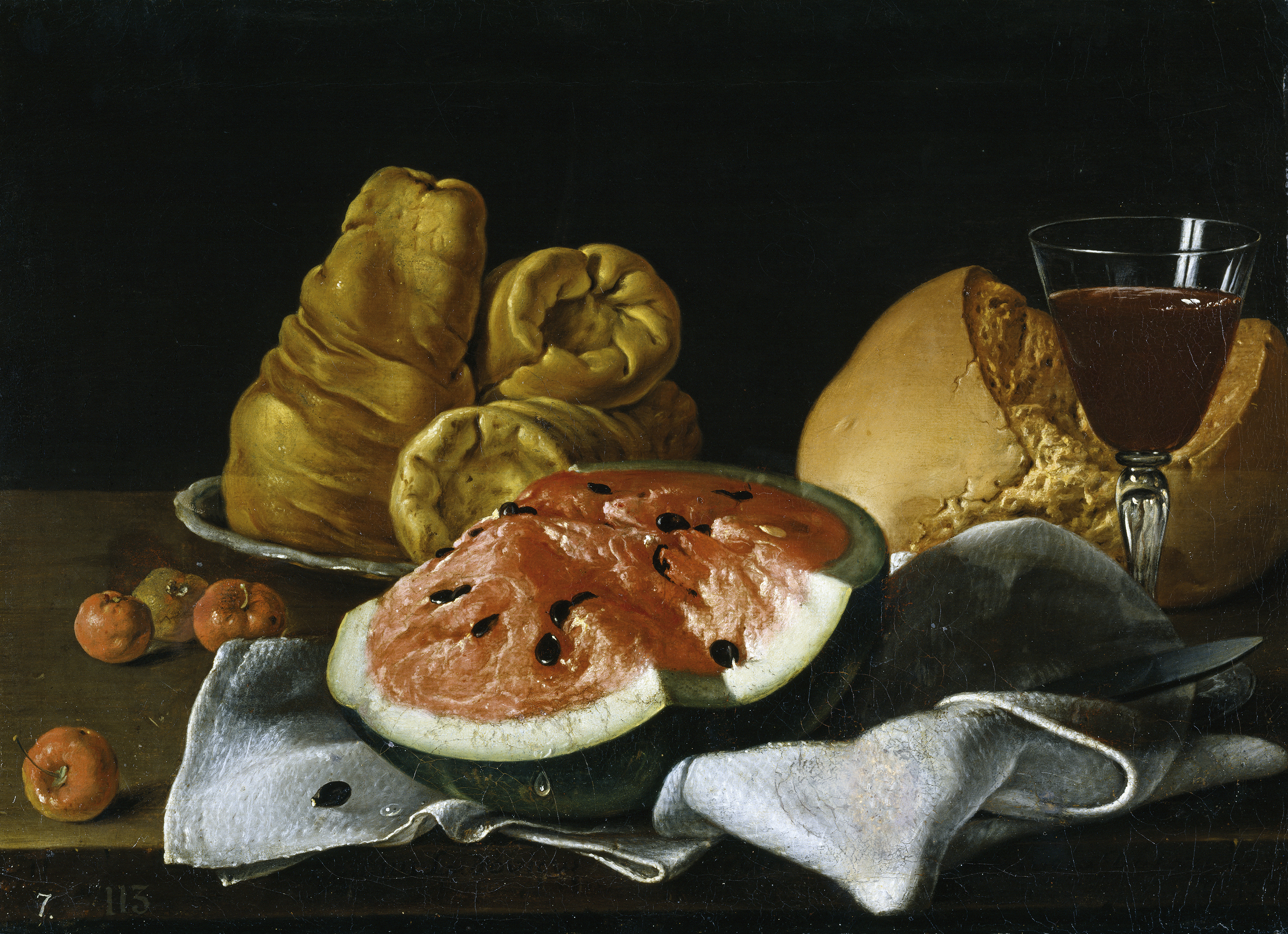
Still Life with Watermelon, Pastries, Bread, and Wine by Luis Egidio Meléndez in 1770

== See also ==
- List of breakfast foods
- List of doughnut varieties
