= Stirling distillery =

Gin and whisky distillery in Stirling, Scotland

Stirling Distillery

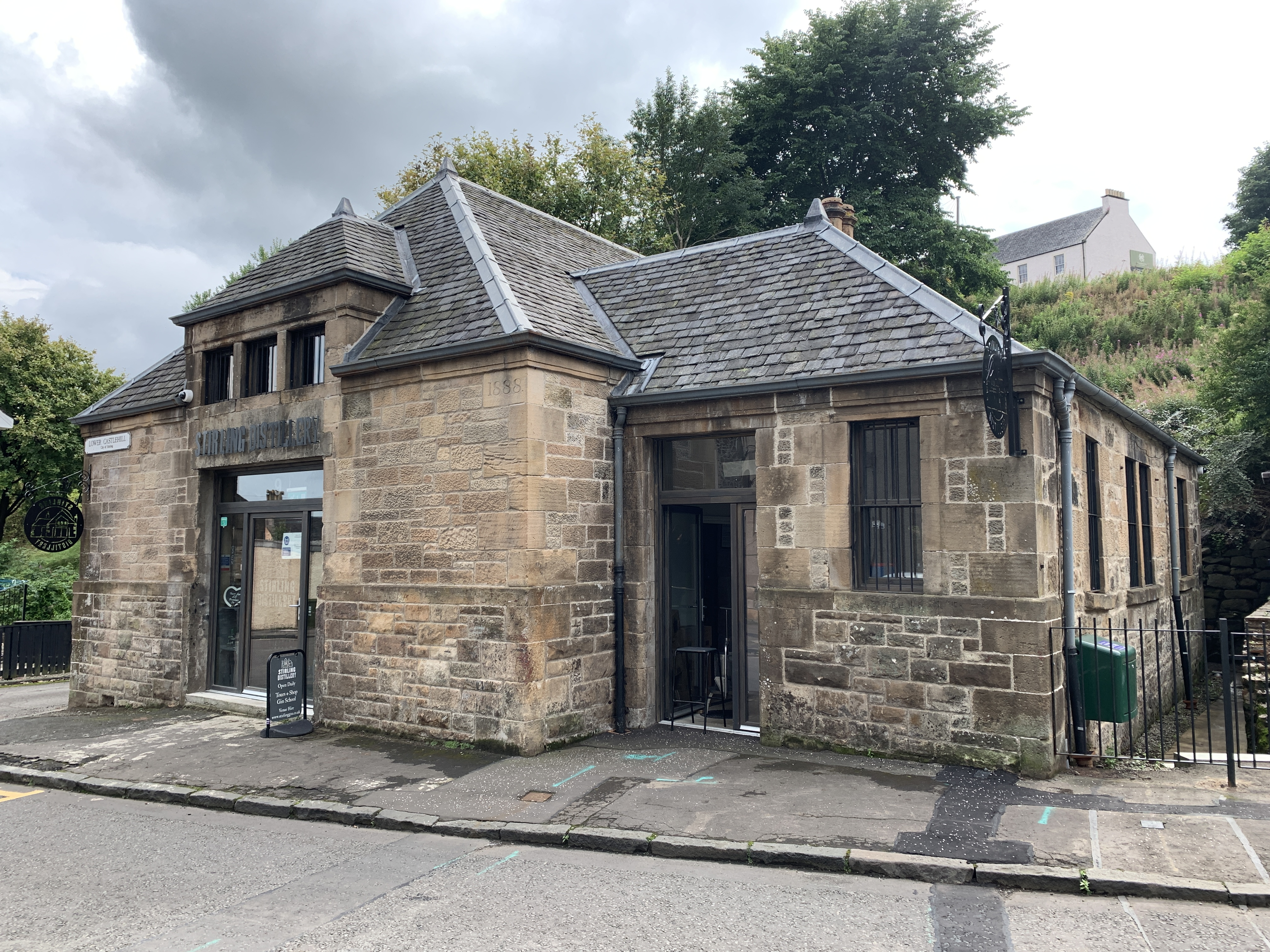
- Location: 9 Lower Castlehill, Stirling FK8 1EN, Scotland, United Kingdom
- Coordinates: 56.1234°N 3.9442°W
- Owner: June McCann; Cameron McCann
- Founded: 2019; 7 years ago
- Status: Operational
- No. of stills: 300 litre alembic
- Capacity: 20,000 litres
- Website: stirlingdistillery.com

Stirling Distillery is a gin and single malt whisky distillery in Stirling, Scotland. The distillery is located at the foot of Stirling Castle. It currently sits as Scotland's smallest whisky distillery.

== History ==
The company was founded in 2015 by couple June and Cameron McCann, who previously owned an art gallery and gift shop in Stirling. The distillery building, a former blacksmith's, was purchased in 2017, and opened to the public in 2019. The site had been derelict for some years, without an internal floor, electricity or water. During the construction period, the site was visited by Bruce Crawford MSP.

In 2021, the distillery changed the name of its Pink Lady gin, named after a ghost said to haunt Stirling Castle, after facing legal action from Apple and Pear Australia Limited (APAL), the owners of the Pink Lady trademark. In 2024, Stirling Gin was listed with supermarket chain Co-op Food.

In 2023, the distillery were awarded "Visitor Attraction of the Year" at the Stirling Business Awards. In October that year, the first run of new make spirit was made at the distillery, becoming the first whisky to be distilled in Stirling since 1852. The new make was awarded "Best Scottish New Make Spirit" at the World Whisky Awards in 2025.

In January 2026, the distillery announced that they would trial releasing whisky in aluminum bottles.

== Products ==
The first gin to be released was Stirling Gin, which uses locally foraged nettles. The test distillations were performed in the McCanns' kitchen, on a miniature 2.4 litre still, which remains on display at the later distillery. Until 2019, the gin was contract distilled between Glasgow distillery and Kinrara distillery. A special edition bottling of the original gin was released to commemorate the Queen's Platinum Jubilee.

The second gin release, Battle Strength, was named for the Battle of Stirling Bridge. In 2021, a limited edition gin, The Gin Blue Line, was released in support of policing charities, and used forget-me-nots, sage, and makrut lime. Another limited edition, OlympiGin, was released to commemorate the 2020 Tokyo Olympics, and used gold flakes and yuzu.

The distillery independently bottles whisky under the Sons of Scotland brand name. The distillery's own whisky is planned to be released under the name "James VI". A whisky liqueur, Castle Rock, was released in 2025.
