= Berner Haselnusslebkuchen =

Swiss gingerbread specialty

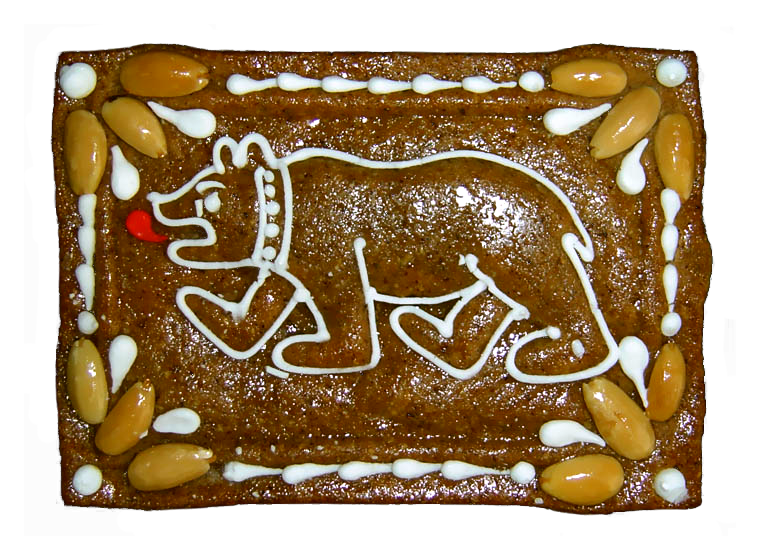
- Type: Lebkuchen
- Place of origin: Switzerland
- Region or state: Bern
- Main ingredients: Hazelnuts, almonds, sugar, honey, cinnamon, candied lemon and orange peel, egg whites

Berner Haselnusslebkuchen are traditional Christmas cakes (Lebkuchen) from Bern, Switzerland. Made from ground hazelnuts, they are not to be confused with the Berner Honiglebkuchen, another Bernese specialty.

== Composition and production ==
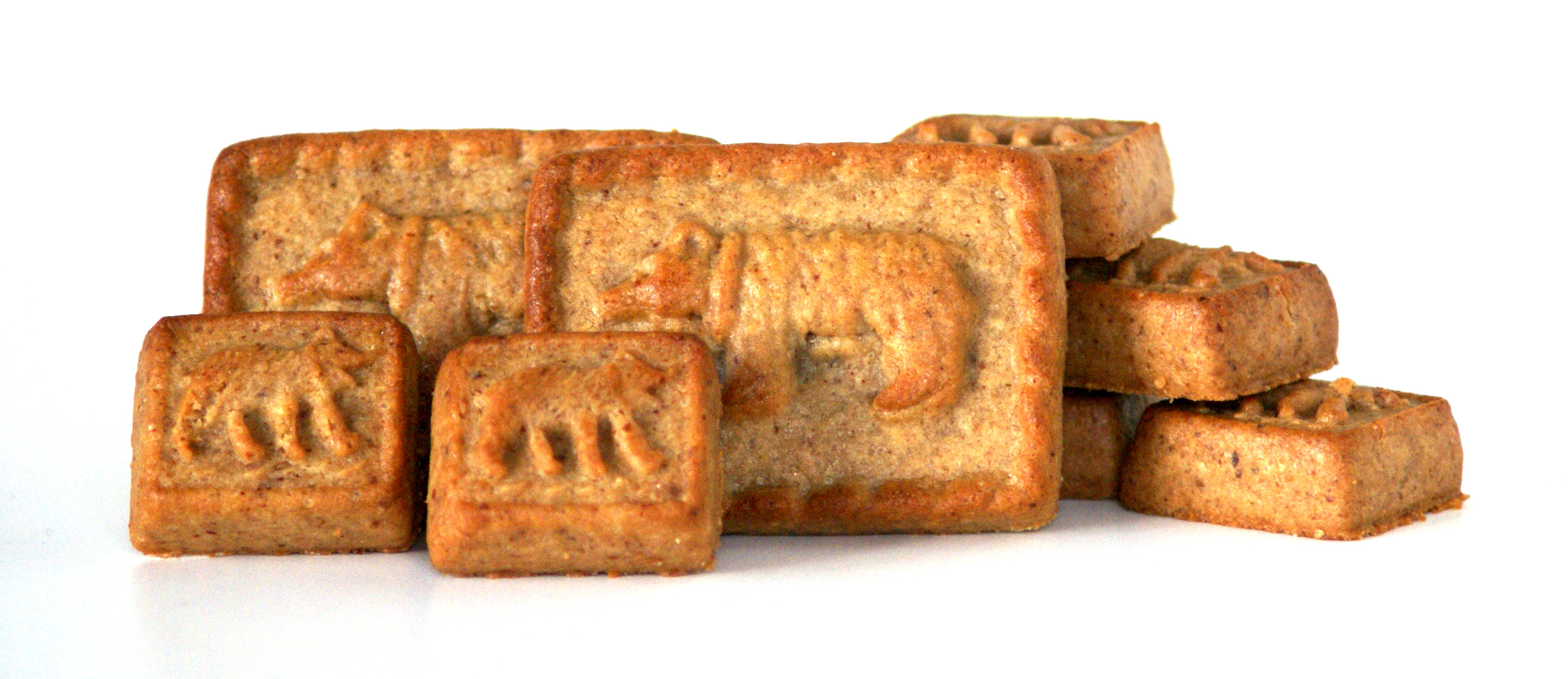
Haselnussleckerli, the smaller variant of the Haselnusslebkuchen.

The Berner Haselnusslebkuchen are made of a marzipan-like mass of roasted and ground hazelnuts and about one eighth ground almonds, as well as a little sugar, honey, cinnamon, candied lemon and orange peel, held together by egg white. The addition of water or flour is not necessary, as the oil in the hazelnuts helps the mass stick together. The grinding of the hazelnuts requires extensive experience: if ground too hard, the hazelnut oils will liquefy and evaporate during baking, making the Lebkuchen hard like a zwieback.

The hazelnut mass is rolled out into a spread of dough 12 millimeters (0.47 in) thick. The baker may then cut out DIN A5-sized rectangular pieces and press them into a form traditionally depicting a bear, Bern's heraldic animal (pictured above). She may also use cookie cutters in the shape of a bear or Santa Claus, or she may cut the dough into small rectangular pieces called Leckerli. The Lebkuchen are then allowed to dry for a few hours, during which the crystallizing sugar forms a faint crust on the dough's surface. Afterwards, they are baked at 200 °C (392 °F) for 10 to 15 minutes. A well-made Haselnusslebkuchen should be crunchy on the outside, but remain soft and moist within. The Lebkuchen may then be decorated further with icing, hazelnuts or almonds.

== History and usage ==
A sweet similar to the Haselnusslebkuchen, although still containing some flour, is first described in the 1835 Neues Berner Kochbuch, a cookbook by Lina Rytz. During the 19th and early 20th century, Bernese cookbooks record numerous recipes for Haselnussleckerli or Bernerläckerli, indicating that the sweet was initially only produced in the small Leckerli form, with the larger rectangular forms coming into use only in the second half of the 20th century. The now-common name of Haselnusslebkuchen is first used in a 1946 baker's manual.

The Lebkuchen's expensive ingredients such as hazelnuts and sugar indicate that it was always a gift article and a holiday sweet; up until the later 19th century, sugar was largely unaffordable for the Bernese working class. Haselnusslebkuchen continue to be made by bakers in the entire canton of Bern during December. In the city of Bern, where tourists provide for a steady demand, they can be bought all year round.

== Bibliography ==
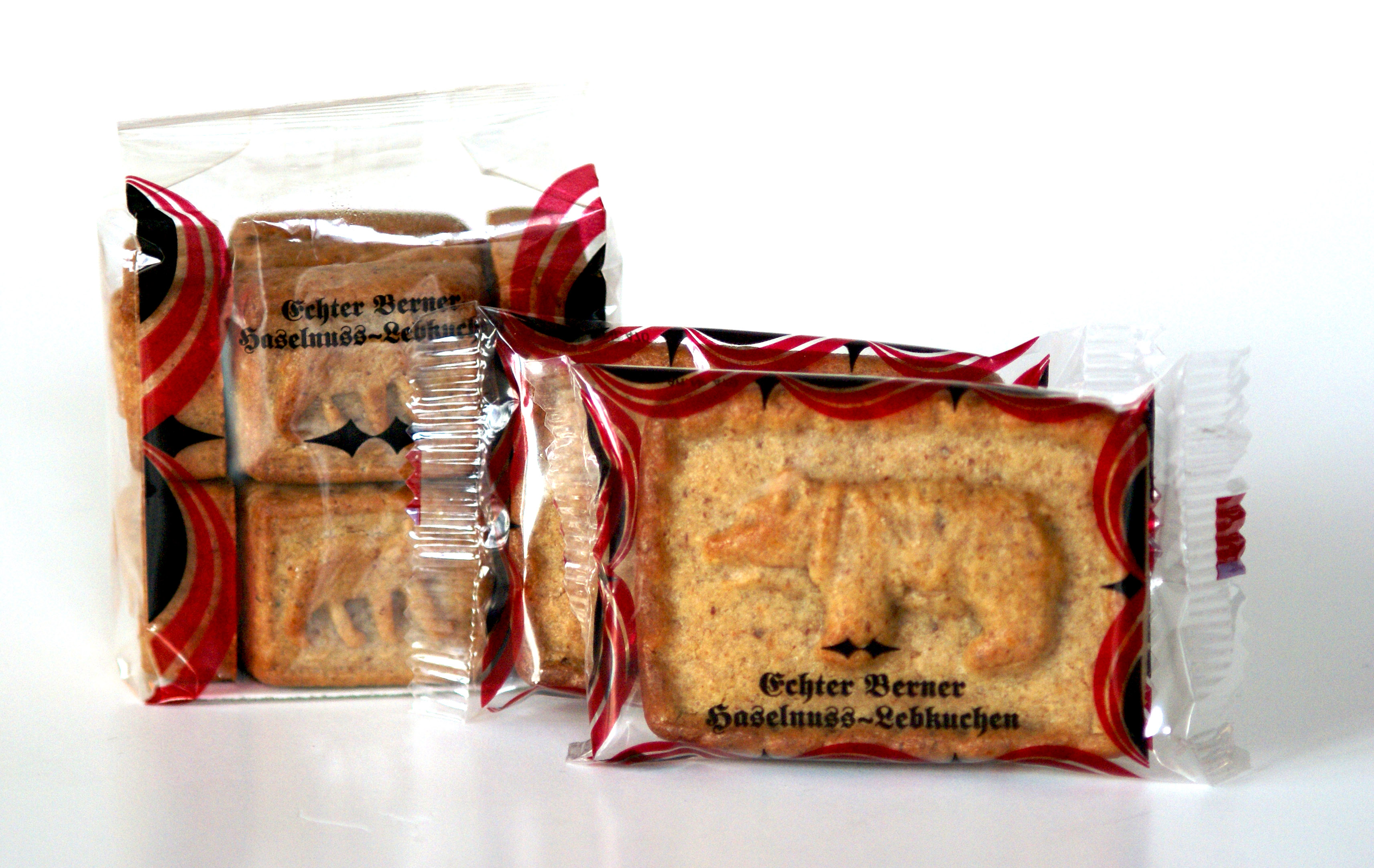
Haselnussleckerli as sold in Bernese stores

- Guggenbühl, Helen, Schweizer Küchenspezialitäten. Ausgewählte Rezepte aus allen Kantonen, Schweizer-Spiegel-Verlag, Zürich, 1929.
- Hansen, Hans Jürgen, Kunstgeschichte des Backwerks, Gerhard Stalling Verlag, Oldenburg, 1968.
- Krauss, Irene, Chronik bildschöner Backwerke, Hugo Matthaes Druckerei und Verlag GmbH & Co. KG, Stuttgart, 1999.
- Währen, Max, Hans Luginbühl, Bruno Heilinger et al., Lebkuchen einst und jetzt, Luzern, 1964.

== See also ==
- Culinary Heritage of Switzerland
