= E175 =

E175 may refer to:

- Edible gold, a food additive coded E 175 in the Codex Alimentarius standards
- The Embraer E175 jet aircraft
