= Cookie decorating =

History and methods for decorating cookies

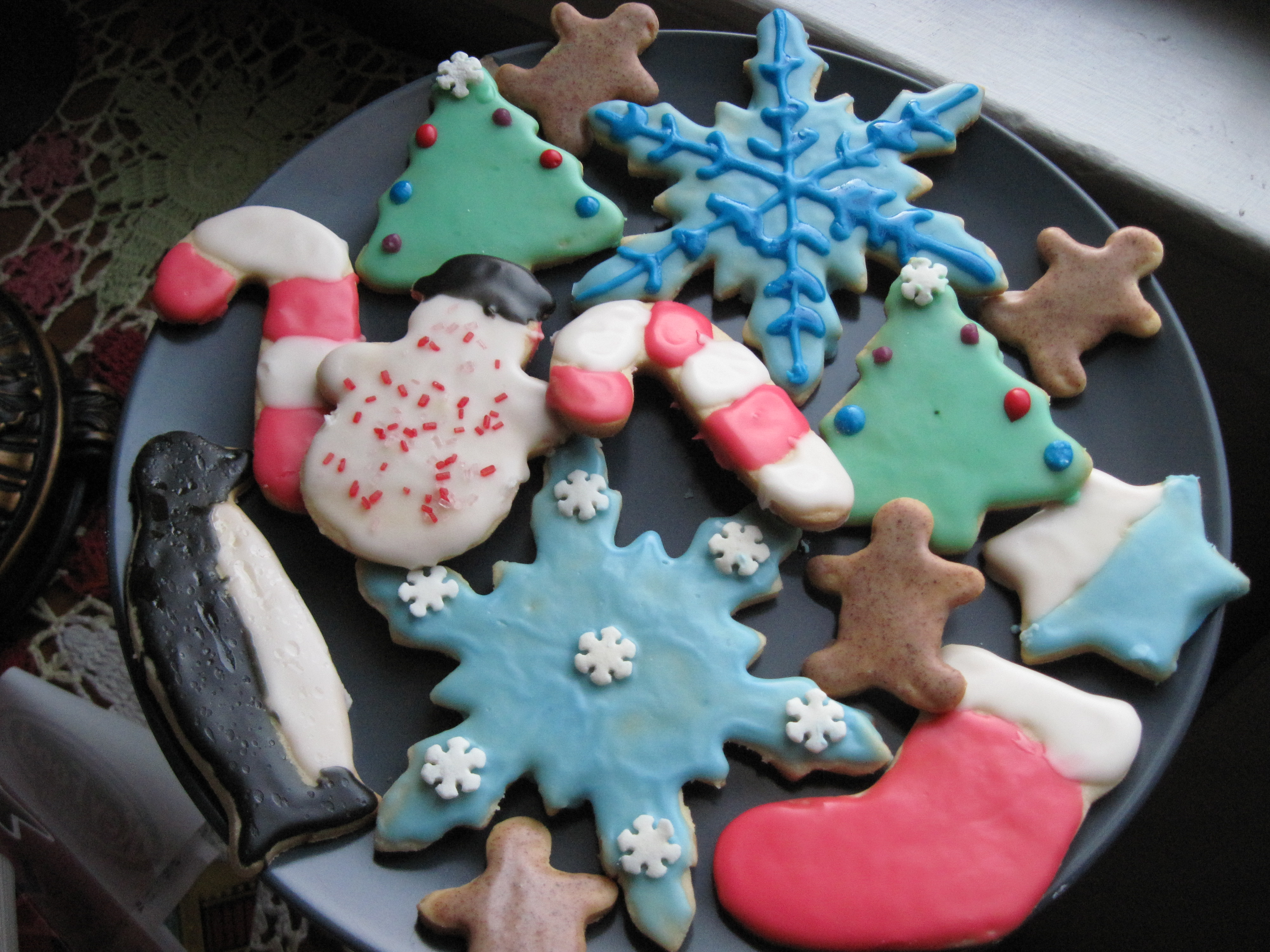
Christmas sugar cookies decorated with icing

Cookie decorating dates back to at least the 14th century when in Switzerland, springerle cookie molds were carved from wood and used to impress Biblical designs into cookies.

The artistic element of cookie making also can be traced back to Medieval Germany where Lebkuchen was crafted into fancy shapes and decorated with sugar. The story of "Hansel and Gretel " published with Grimm's Fairy Tales in 1812 inspired German gingerbread cookie Christmas cards. Also during the 17th century, Dutch and German settlers introduced cookie cutters, decorative molds, and festive holiday cookie decorations to the United States.

Today cookie decorating traditions continue in many places in the world and include such activities as cookie decorating parties, competitions, creating cookie bouquets and cookie gift baskets, and simply decorating cookies with children as a fun family activity.

Glaze, royal icing and fondant are all popular choices for decorating cookies.

== History ==
One of the earliest recorded forms of cookie decorating is the springerle, and the oldest known springerle mold is housed at the Swiss national museum in Zurich, Switzerland. This round-shaped mold was carved from wood in the 14th century and pictures the Easter Lamb.

A springerle mold or press (carved rolling pins) is used to imprint a picture or design on to a cookie. These cookies have been the traditional Christmas cookies in Bavaria and Austria for centuries. To add to the decorative effect, the designs may be colored with food coloring, or when used for decorative purposes only, with tempera or acrylic paints.

Springerle cookies originally displayed biblical scenes and were used to teach the illiterate about the Bible. Eventually, the cookies were decorated with secular scenes depicting images of life events, such as marriages and births.

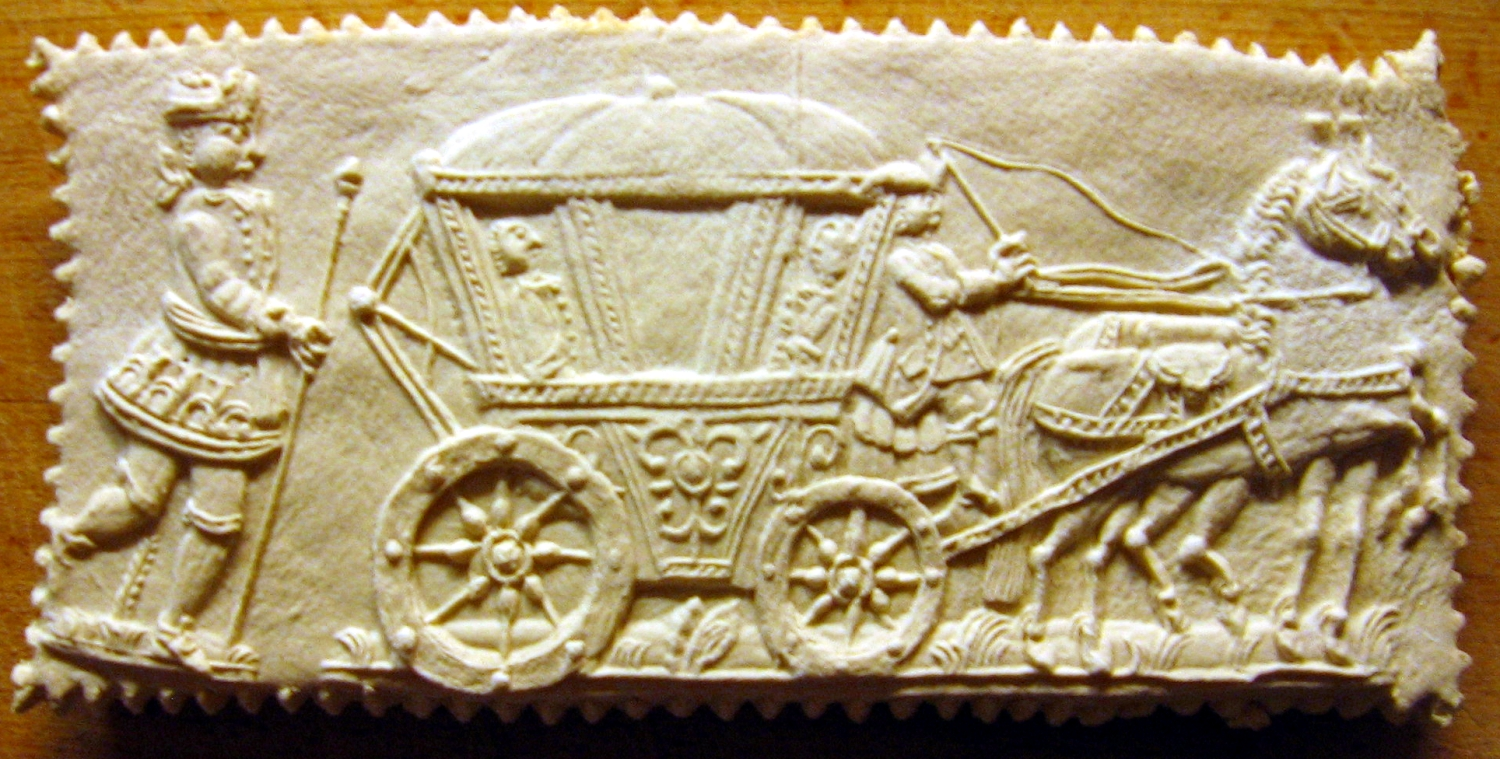
Springerle

Food historians also trace the artistic element of cookie making back to Medieval Germany where Lebkuchen (gingerbread) was crafted into fancy shapes and decorated with sugar. However, the Lebkuchen guilds only permitted professional gingerbread bakers to make this, with the exceptions of Christmas and Easter when anyone was free to make their own.

These gingerbread "portraits" were decorated with cloves dipped in gold.

During the 17th century, guild employed master bakers and artisans created intricate works of art with their gingerbread houses and cookies. It was also during this period in Germany when cookies, in the form of Lebkuchen, were introduced as Christmas decorations.

In 1812, Grimm's Fairy Tales was published, and the tale of "Hansel and Gretel" inspired 19th century bakeries to create more finely detailed molded cookies such as gingerbread cookie Christmas cards. In particular, the Tinsmiths led the movement by crafting stylized cookie cutters of various shapes and sizes.

Many a Victorian Christmas tree was adorned with decorated cookies in the shapes of animals and gingerbread men.

Also during the 17th century, Dutch and German settlers introduced cookie cutters, decorative molds, and festive holiday decorations to the United States. Gingerbread was likely the first U.S.-made Christmas cookie. Sugar cookies, one of the most widely decorated of cookies today, evolved from the English.

The German cookie cutters produced more stylized cookies, many with secular Christmas subjects, and for less cost, than the local American tinsmiths. When import laws opened the floodgates to low-cost, German-imported cooking utensils, including cookie cutters, between 1871 and 1906, the American tradition of decorating cookies for Christmas tree ornamentation took hold. In response to this cookie cutter boom, U.S. published cookbooks began featuring cookies in decorative shapes such as bells and Santa Clauses.

Today cookie decorating traditions continue in many places in the world and include: decorating cookies for Christmas and other holidays, cookie decorating parties, decorating cookies for cookie bouquets and gift baskets, trimming the Christmas tree with decorated cookies, and decorating cookies with the children, to name a few.

Cookie decorating events can even be found at history and art museums. And they are frequently found at holiday events, community centers and classrooms. Decorated cookies also win ribbons at county and state fairs.

== Cookie cutters ==
Many decorating techniques used today do not require elaborate cookie cutters. The simplest of shapes can be quite versatile in serving various themes. For example, a star-shaped cutter can be used for Christmas, 4 July, and messages of congratulations. A circle can be decorated as a sun, ball, flower, spider web, or smiley face.

But some occasions call for special cookie cutters, even custom-made ones. For example, in honor of a 50th wedding anniversary, a photograph of the couple's first car could be sent to a company, and the cutter would be custom made to depict this. Then, the person making the cookies would decorate them to complete the depiction.

== Icing ==
Royal icing is often used to decorate cookies because it dries hard. At the White House 2005 Christmas, Thaddeus DuBois, the White House Executive Pastry Chef at that time, decorated snowflake cookies with brushed and piped royal icing. In this case, as with many of the decorated cookies Dubois made for the president, his family and their guests, the traditional royal icing was used, a mixture of raw egg whites, powdered sugar, and a drop of lemon juice.

Due to health issues with raw egg consumption, such as salmonella, an egg-free variation of royal icing is sometimes alternatively used by decorators. Meringue powder is used instead of the egg whites to create stiffness. Pasteurized refrigerated egg whites are sold at grocery stores for a safer traditional recipe. Aquafaba is also used as a vegan raw egg white alternative.

A sugar glaze made without egg whites and consisting of powdered sugar, water, corn syrup and flavoring (such as almond) is another popular choice for decorating cookies. To decorate a cookie with glaze, an outline is piped just inside the edge of the cookie. Then the design is filled by piping a line of glaze back and forth across the cookie, while staying within the boundaries of the outline.

The glaze must be applied quickly because royal icing crusts quickly, but it needs to be moist enough for the piped lines to melt into each, so that the design is smooth. When the icing may crust faster than a design can be filled, the design can be blocked off first into smaller sections. To block off the design, cookie decorators pipe the outline of the cookie as usual, but then section it off in smaller sections, filling them in one at a time. Empty nooks and crannies that the decorating tip didn't pipe into can be filled by carefully dragging a toothpick through the icing into any empty spaces.

Cookies can be decorated with more than one color of icing. This is accomplished by allowing the first color to dry completely (often for as long as 2 hours) before adding the second color of icing.

While the goal is usually to keep the colors separated when filling in a design on a cookie with icing (such as the white of Santa's beard from the red of his suit), sometimes the colors or bled together on purpose to create a design such as a spider web design. First a white outline is piped and filled in with white. Then using the black icing, a spiral from the center to the outer edge is piped. The web is created by dragging a toothpick in a straight line from the center across the spiral to the outer edge. The more lines, the more intricate the web. decorating bags, one filled with white icing and another with black, and both fit with small round tips.

== Fondant ==
Fondant is another type of icing that is used to decorate cookies. Fondant can be colored by kneading the coloring into the dough. It can be rolled out, and then cut in shapes to match the cookies or their designs. Fondant can be purchased ready-made; however it is not favored for its taste. A homemade fondant that is often praised for its taste and function is marshmallow fondant, which is also used by cake decorators for covering cakes.

When rolling fondant, a silicone mat or parchment will eliminate the need for dusting the rolling surface with powdered sugar, and this will make it easier to lift and transfer the cut pieces to the cookies.

The rolled out fondant may be cut into shapes with the same cookie cutters used to cut the cookies. Once cut out, the fondant is placed on top of the cookie. Some types of fondant will adhere right away to the cookie. If the fondant doesn't stick well, the cookie surface may be brushed with a little vanilla extract, corn syrup or piping gel to provide more sticking power.

Fondant covered cookies, just like plain or icing covered cookies, are well-suited to embellishments such as silver dragees and other shiny decorations. Tweezers can be a helpful tool for positioning tiny ornaments.

== Decorating the fondant ==
An impression mat can be used with fondant to add design and/or texture. First the fondant is rolled out and then the mat is placed face down on the fondant. Finally, by gently but firmly going over the mat with the rolling pin, the impression is made in the fondant. Then the shapes are cut out.

For example, to create a lace heart, a patch of white fondant is rolled out first on a silicone mat. Then an embossed fondant roller is slowly rolled across the surface of the fondant. A heart shaped cookie cutter is used to cut out the fondant hearts. The heart shaped fondant is then peeled off the silicone mat carefully so as not to mar the embossed design. Next, the fondant is trimmed and placed on top of the cookie. Finally the fondant-covered cookie may be brushed with a light dusting of pearl luster dust.

Many of the same decorations used by cake decorators are also used on cookies. Sprinkles, as dragees, colored sugars, beads, non-pareils and finely chopped nuts, as well as more expensive decorations like edible gold leaf, are used to decorate cookies.

== Edible silver and gold ==
The silver and gold covered Dragées and other silver and gold cake and cookie decorations sometimes used have not been FDA approved in the United States. Some of these have been approved for human consumption in other countries, such as Easy Leaf's edible gold and silver in Italy.

Edible gold and silver have been used for centuries to garnish foods and drinks. The precious metals come in sprinkles, small flakes and leaves and are available at specialty stores and online. However, this usage is controversial. According to The Washington Post, a U.S. Food and Drug Administration staff expert said that edible gold and silver had not gone through pre-market safety evaluations at the FDA "because no one has sought pre-market approval."

The Washington Post article also reported the expert (who reportedly spoke only on the condition of anonymity) as saying he had not taken a position on edible metals, that they pass right through the body, and are "an expensive way to throw away gold." Tobias Freccia, founder of an edible gold retail website, was also quoted in the article saying a "book of 500 gold leaves may cost $495, but a 100 mg shaker of the precious metals sells for $19.95."
