= Cookie cutter =

Dough-cutting tool

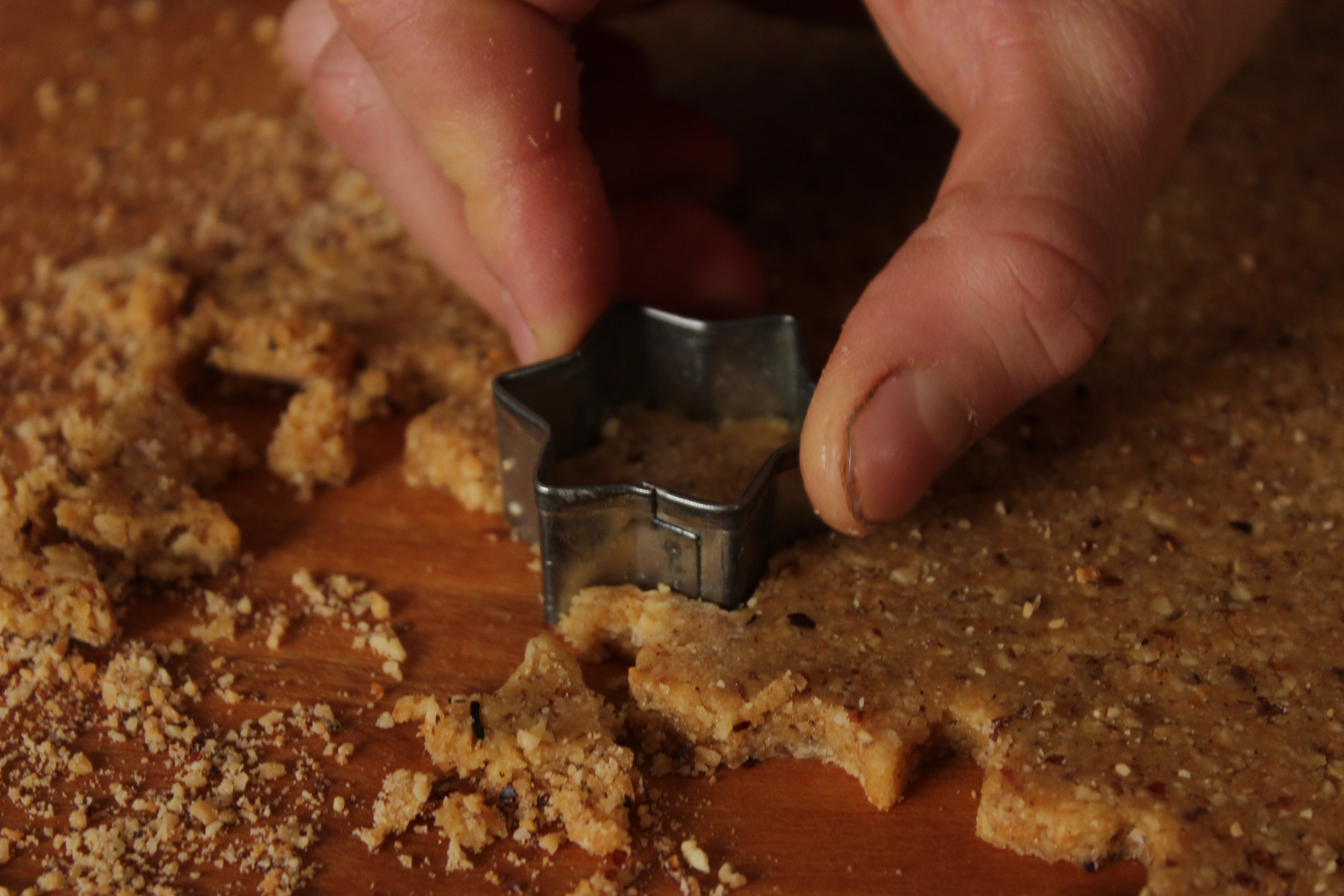
Cutting Christmas cookies

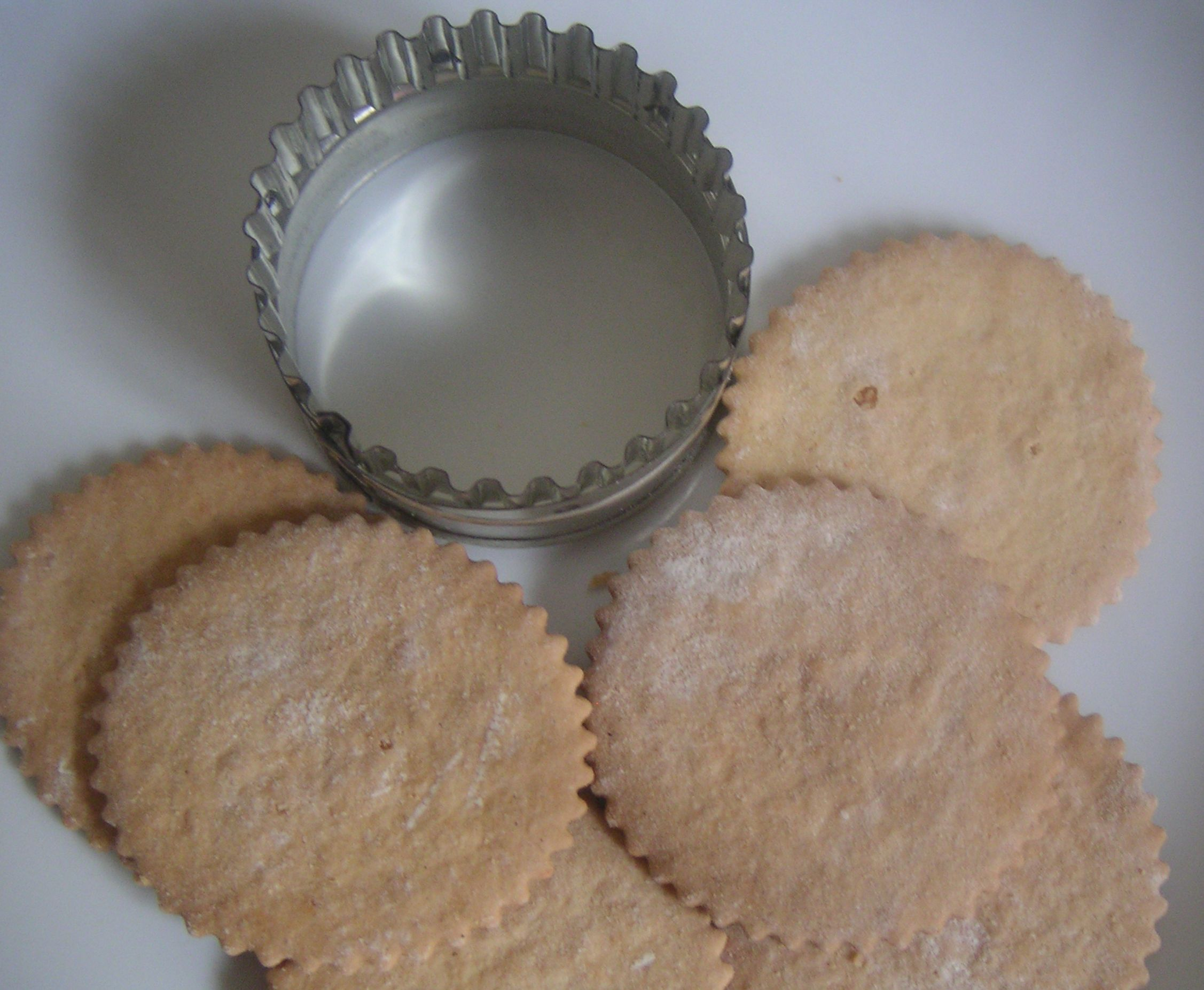
A simple cookie cutter and the cookies produced by it

A cookie cutter (also known as a biscuit cutter outside the US) is a tool for cutting cookie dough into a particular shape, by pressing a shaped blade down into the dough.

They are often used for seasonal occasions when well-known decorative shapes are desired, or for large batches of cookies where simplicity and uniformity are required. Cookie cutters can also be used for shaping, molding, forming and cutting numerous other types of foods, including meat patties, pancakes, sandwiches and decorative embellishments for platters (for example, fancy-cut fruit).

== Types and variations ==
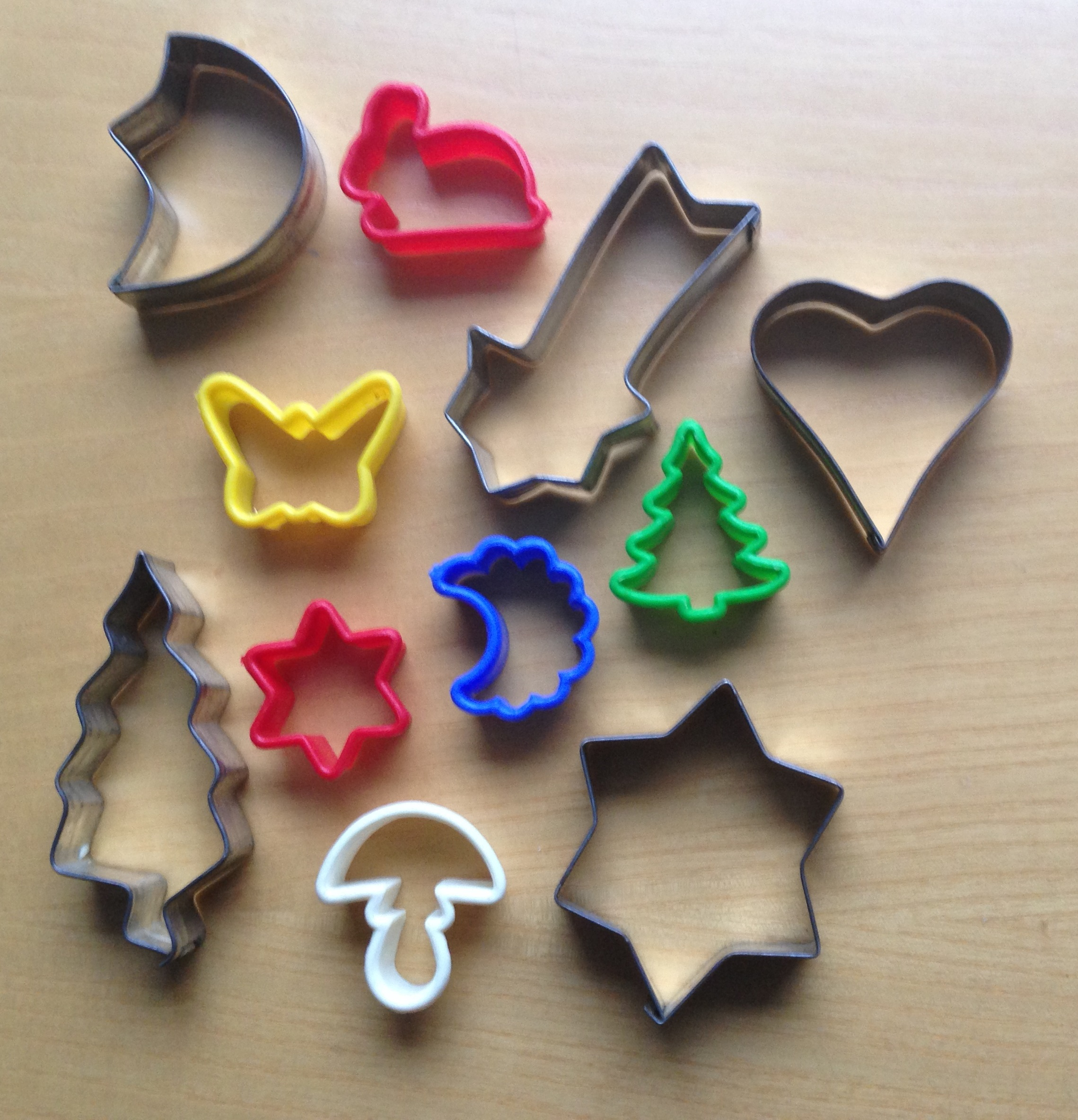
Metal and plastic cookie cutters in novelty shapes

Cutout
Most commonly made of copper, tin, stainless steel, aluminium, or plastic. Cutouts are the simplest of the cookie cutters; the cutter is pressed into cookie dough that has been rolled flat to produce the shape of the cutter's outline. To keep the dough from sticking, they are often dipped in flour or sugar before use.
Detail imprint
Commonly made of copper, tin, or plastic. Detail imprints are similar to cutout cookie cutters, except that detail imprints also mark the surface of the dough.
Cookie mould
Usually made of wood, ceramic, or plastic. Springerle moulds are the oldest examples of such, and are popular for Scottish shortbread. A cookie mould typically has an ornate design debossed into the surface; the mould is pressed into the cookie dough to produce an embossed design. These moulds may be flat disks or may be in the shape of a rolling pin.
Cookie press
An automated or hand-operated cookie press, also called a cookie gun, is used to make large batches of cookies quickly. The cookie dough is extruded onto the baking sheet in ornate shapes that would otherwise be too difficult or time-consuming to create by hand.
Cookie cutting sheet
Used for larger volumes, a production cookie cutting sheet is a piece of sturdy plastic the size of a full sheet pan that essentially has dozens of cutout cookie cutters mounted on to it. Rather than rolling out the dough and pressing the cutter into the top of the dough, the cutting sheet is placed on the baking sheet, cutting side up. A sheet of cookie dough, already rolled to the correct thickness, is laid on top of the cutting sheet, and a rolling pin is used to press the dough down on to the sharp edges of the cutting sheet. The cut cookies fall through the holes into the sheet, into their properly spaced positions on the baking sheet. The scrap dough and cutting sheet are removed, and the pan is ready for baking. Cookie cutter sheets allow high volume production without the time or risk of moving cut cookies to baking sheets, resulting in rapid production of a more uniformly shaped and spaced product.

== Commercial scale ==
Cookie cutters generally make a single shape at one time, but other options are available for large-scale production.

In 1875, Alexander P. Ashbourne patented the first biscuit cutter in the US, useful for cutting multiple cookies, cakes, or baking powder biscuits at once. It consisted of a board to roll the dough out on, which was hinged to a metal plate with various cutting spring-loaded shapes mounted to it.

== See also ==
- Cookie decorating
- Punch (tool)
