= Berner Honiglebkuchen =

Culinary specialty of Bern, Switzerland

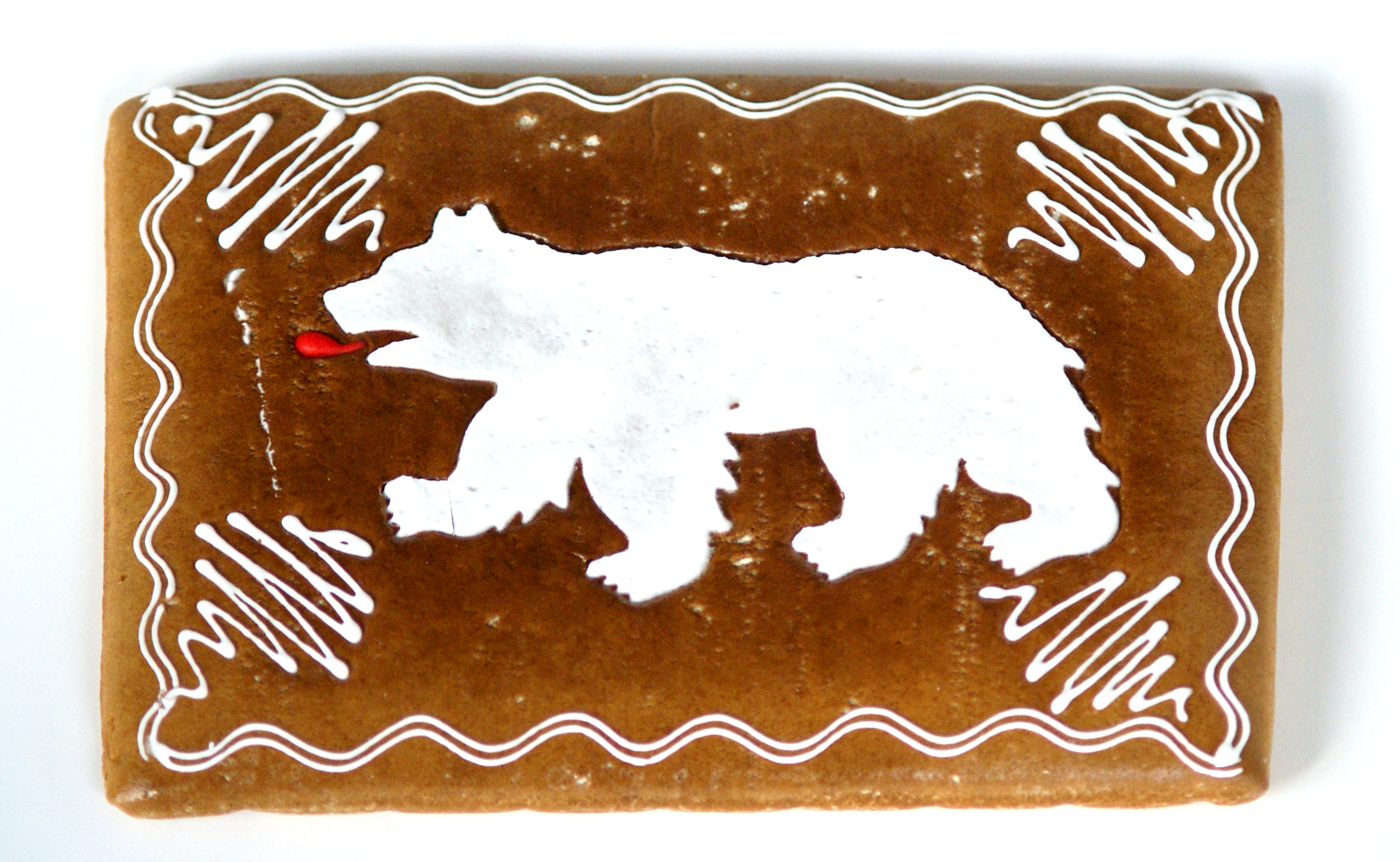
- Type: Lebkuchen
- Place of origin: Switzerland
- Region or state: Bern
- Main ingredients: Flour, honey, milk, margarine, potassium carbonate, icing

Berner Honiglebkuchen are Lebkuchen traditionally made in Bern, Switzerland. Distinguished from other Lebkuchen by their sometimes elaborate sugar decorations, they are not to be confused with the Berner Haselnusslebkuchen, another Bernese specialty which is made from ground hazelnuts.

== Composition and production ==
Honiglebkuchen dough is made of honey, milk, margarine, flour and potassium carbonate (as leavening agent), as well as a mixture of spices. The spice mixture is specific to each bakery – which is why it is said that no two Honiglebkuchen taste the same – but coriander, anise, star anise, cloves, ginger and nutmeg are commonly used.

After a leavening period of four days, the dough is softened by rolling it, rolled out to a thickness of 6 millimeters (0.24 in), and cut into the desired shape. Most Honiglebkuchen are rectangular, but round or heart-shaped forms are also used. The Lebkuchen are baked as dryly as possible at around 220 °C (428 °F) for about 14 to 20 minutes. Immediately afterwards, they are given a shiny coat with a solution of potato starch in water, called Feculé.

The sugar decorations are traditionally applied manually by specialised confectioners using a triangular bag. The most popular motif is the bear, Bern's heraldic animal, which is shown in various scenes and poses, such as in the Bärengraben. Cheaper Lebkuchen, such as the one pictured above, feature standardised decorations applied by template.

== History ==
Lebkuchen with honey and exotic spices were already made in medieval Swiss monasteries. A 16th-century recipe from Lucerne is already very similar to the contemporary recipe, except that fewer spices were used. In Bern, the Lebkuchen is first recorded in early 19th century cookbooks. The sugar decorations are believed to have come into general use some time after sugar manufactured from mangelwurzel became widely affordable in the early 19th century, but around the turn of the 20th century at the latest. A baker's manual of 1946 records that "the embellishments ... are made according to a decades-old tradition" and that "the application of bears, edelweiss, doves and so forth ... is and has always been a specialty and a point of pride of the Bernese confectioner."

Together with their hazelnut counterpart, Honiglebkuchen are the signature product of Bernese bakers and are particularly popular in the December holiday season, as well as with tourists throughout the year. Recently, Honiglebkuchen whose decoration can be customised through Internet services have also become popular.

== Consumption ==
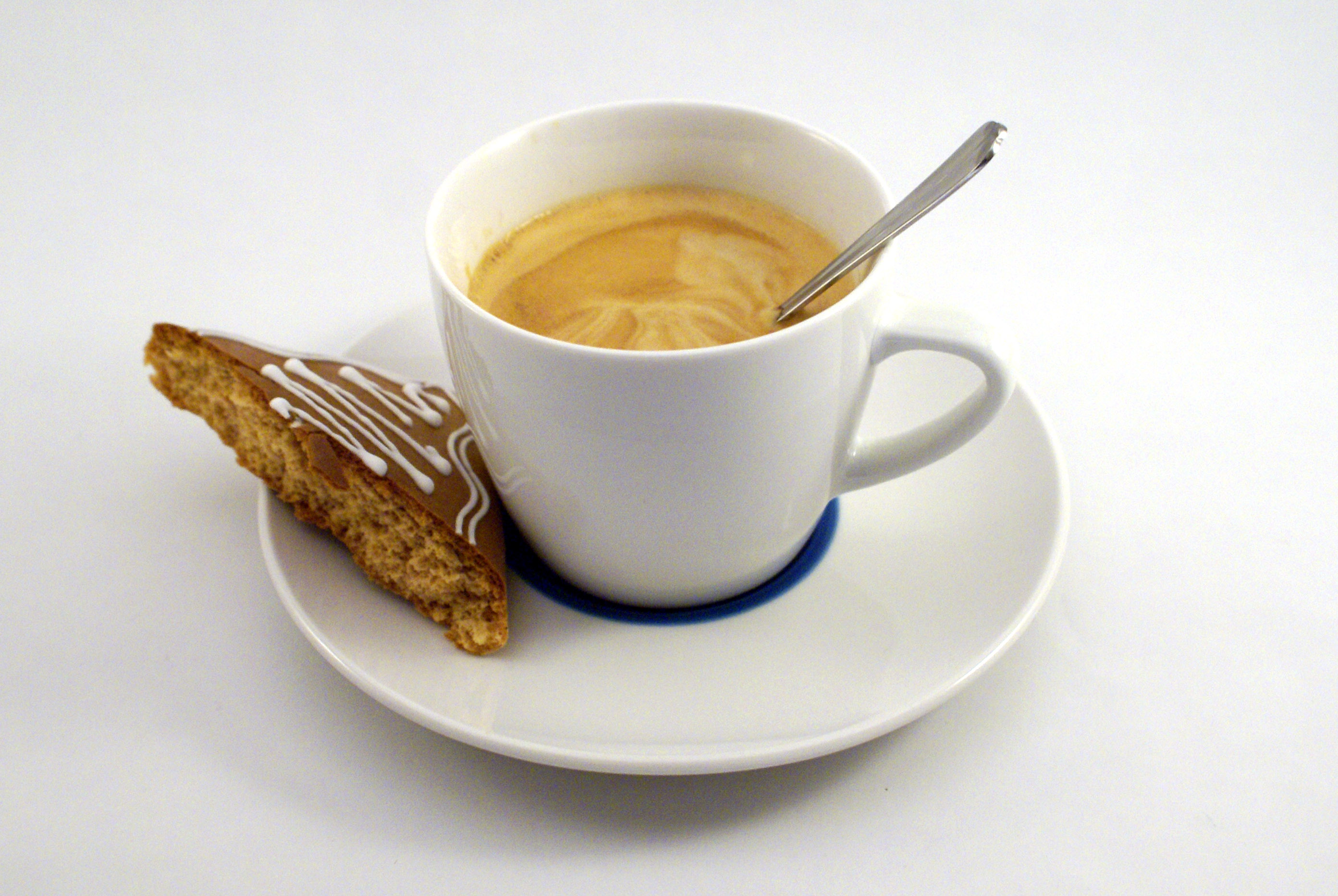
Honiglebkuchenserved with coffee

Bakers recommend taking the Lebkuchen together with café au lait, in which the cake can also be dunked to improve its flavour. If eaten in this manner, even Lebkuchen hardened by months of exposure to air remain appetizing.

== Bibliography ==
- Spycher, Albert, Ostschweizer Lebkuchenbuch. St. Galler und Appenzeller Biber, Biberfladen und Verwandte, Appenzeller Verlag, Herisau, 2000.
- Krauss, Irene, Chronik bildschöner Backwerke, Hugo Matthaes Druckerei und Verlag GmbH & Co. KG, Stuttgart, 1999.
- Hansen, Hans Jürgen, Kunstgeschichte des Backwerks, Gerhard Stalling Verlag, Oldenburg, 1968.
- Währen, Max, Hans Luginbühl, Bruno Heilinger et al., Lebkuchen einst und jetzt, Luzern, 1964.

== See also ==
- Culinary Heritage of Switzerland
