= Lebkuchen =

German honey-sweetened cake

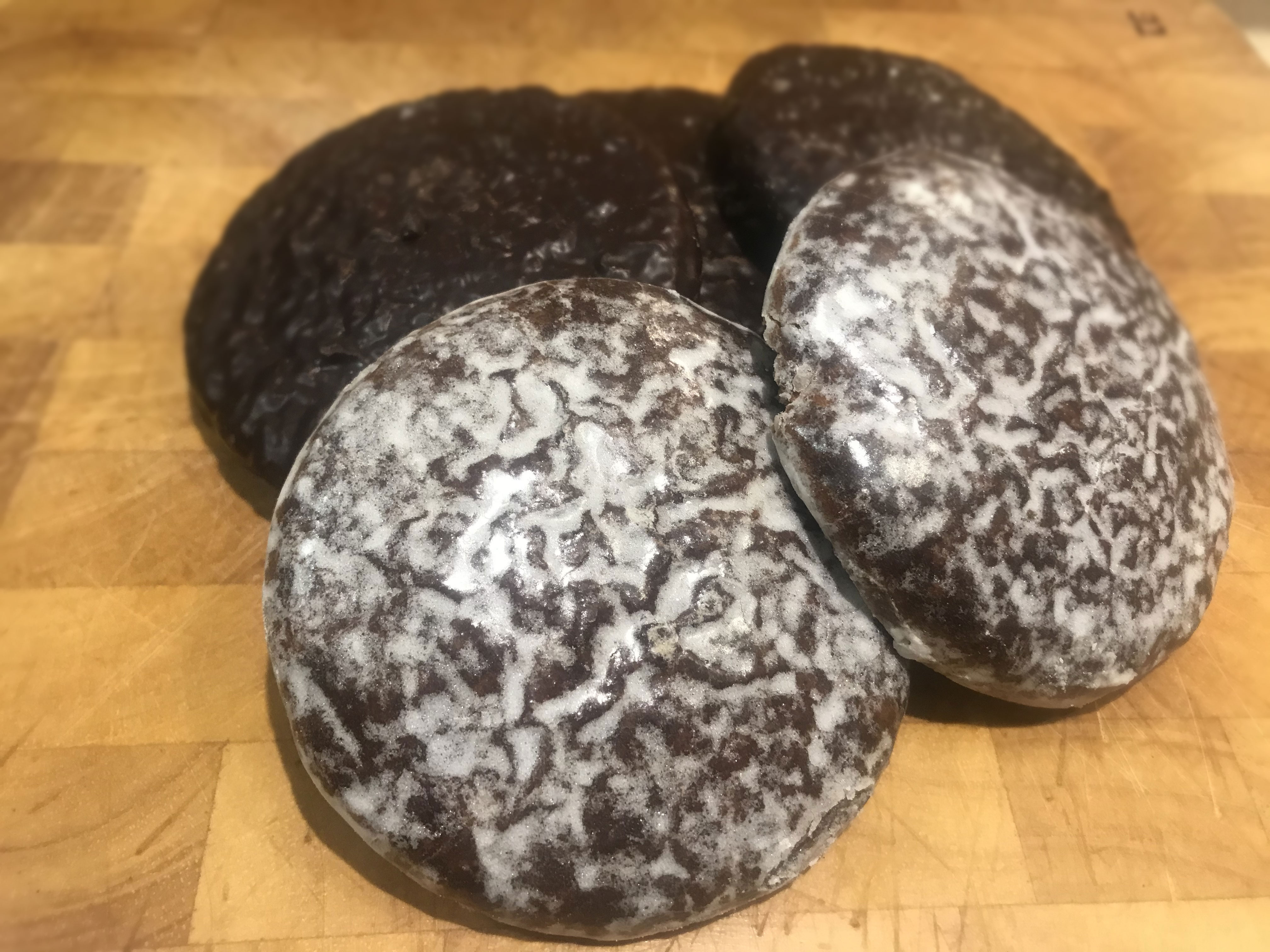
- An assortment of glazed and dark chocolate Lebkuchen
- Alternative names: Pfefferkuchen
- Type: Cake
- Place of origin: Germany
- Region or state: Franconia
- Main ingredients: Honey, spices (aniseed, coriander, cloves, ginger, cardamom, allspice), nuts (almonds, hazelnuts, and walnuts), candied fruit

Lebkuchen (German: [ˈleːpˌkuːxnˌ]), Honigkuchen (German: [ˈhoːnɪçˌkuːxn̩], 'honey cakes') or Pfefferkuchen (German: [ˈpfɛfɐˌkuːxn̩], 'pepper cakes') are honey-sweetened German cakes, moulded cookies or bar cookies that have become part of Germany's Christmas traditions. They are similar to gingerbread.

== Etymology ==
The etymology of Leb- in the term Lebkuchen is uncertain. Proposed derivations include: from the Latin libum (flat bread), from the Germanic word Laib (loaf), and from the Germanic word lebbe (very sweet). Another likely possibility is that it comes from the old term Leb-Honig, the rather solid crystallized honey taken from the hive, that cannot be used for much beside baking. Folk etymology often associates the name with Leben (life), Leib (body), or Leibspeise (favorite food). Kuchen means 'cake'.

== History ==
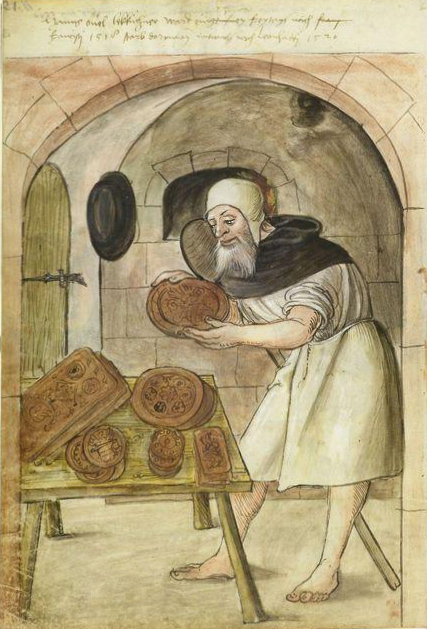
A Lebküchner from a manuscript c. 1520, in the Stadtbibliothek Nürnberg

Sometime in history bakers noticed that honey-sweetened dough would undergo a natural fermentation process when stored in a cool location for several weeks, creating air bubbles that would improve the quality of the bread. Lebkuchen was started in November and baked in December after undergoing this fermentation period.

Lebkuchen was invented by monks in Franconia, Germany, in the 13th century. Lebkuchen bakers were recorded as early as 1296 in Ulm, and 1395 in Nürnberg (Nuremberg). The latter is the most famous exporter today of the product known as Nürnberger Lebkuchen (Nuremberg Lebkuchen).

Nuremberg and the city of Toruń, itself famous for special gingerbread, were eager to protect the secrets of their recipes from each other. Finally in 1556, they formed an agreement by which each city could bake the specialties of the other.

Local history in Nuremberg relates that emperor Friedrich III held a Reichstag there in 1487 and he invited the children of the city to a special event where he presented Lebkuchen bearing his printed portrait to almost four thousand children. Historically, and due to differences in the ingredients, Lebkuchen is also known as "honey cake" (Honigkuchen) or "pepper cake" (Pfefferkuchen). Traditionally, the cookies are usually quite large and may be 11.5 cm (4.5 in) in diameter if round, and larger if rectangular. Unlike other cities where women could bake and sell the holiday cookies at will, in Nuremberg only members of the baker's guild were allowed to bake the cookies.

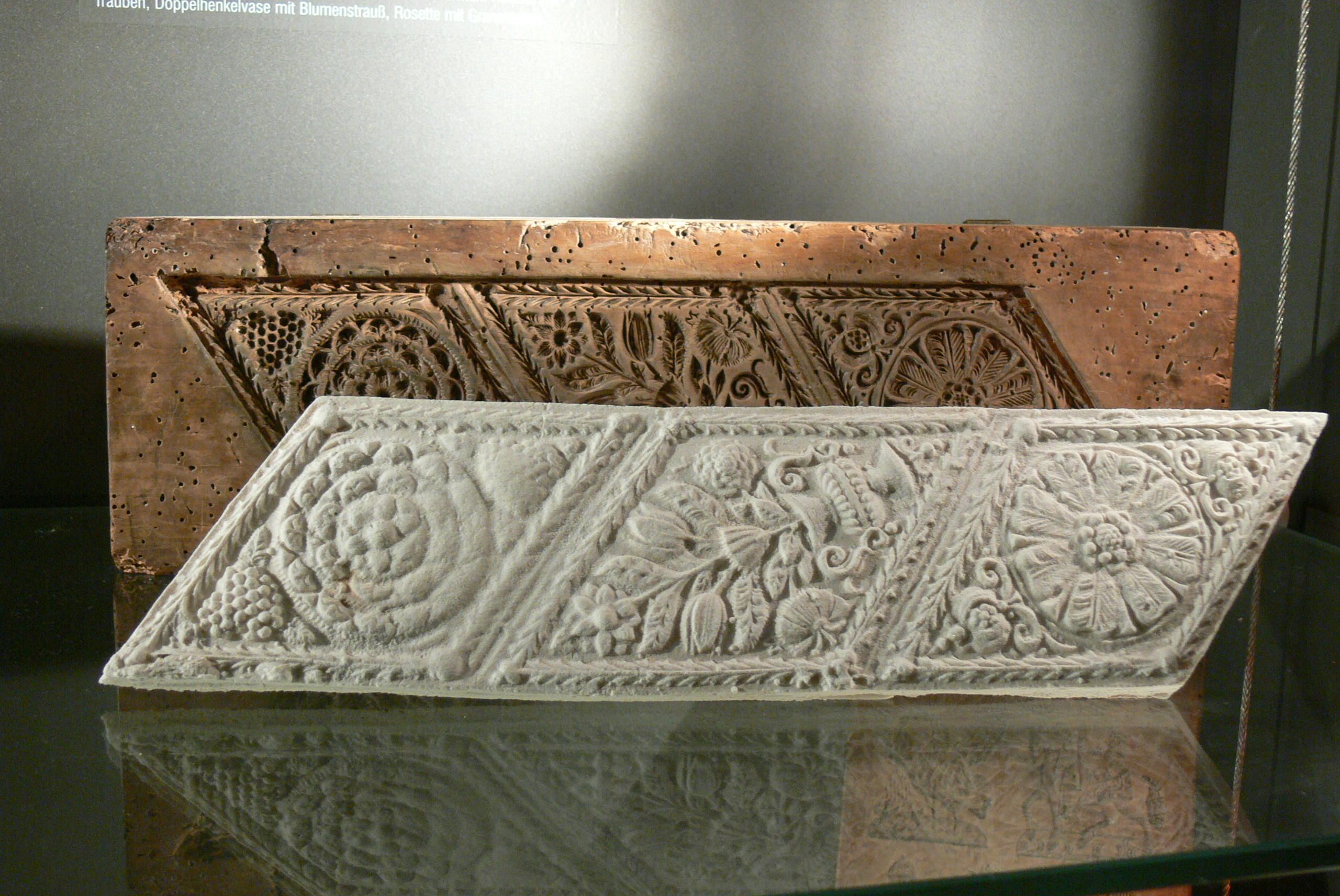
Mould used for marzipan or Lebkuchen, 17th/18th century, collection of the Oberhausmuseum

Since 1808, a variety of Nürnberg Lebkuchen made without flour has been called Elisenlebkuchen. It is uncertain whether Elise was the daughter of a gingerbread baker or the wife of a margrave. Her name is associated with some of the Lebkuchen produced by members of the guild. Since 1996, Nürnberger Lebkuchen is a protected designation of origin, meaning that it must be produced within the boundaries of the city.

== Types ==
Lebkuchen range in taste from spicy to sweet and come in a variety of shapes with round being the most common. The ingredients usually include honey, spices such as aniseed, cardamom, coriander, cloves, ginger, and allspice, nuts including almonds, hazelnuts, and walnuts, or candied fruit.

In Germany, types of Lebkuchen are distinguished by the kind of nuts used and their proportions. Salt of Hartshorn and potash are often used for raising the dough. Lebkuchen dough is usually placed on a thin wafer base called an Oblate. This was an idea of the monks, who used unleavened communion wafer ingredients to prevent the dough from sticking. Typically, they are glazed or covered with very dark chocolate or a thin sugar coating, but some are left uncoated.

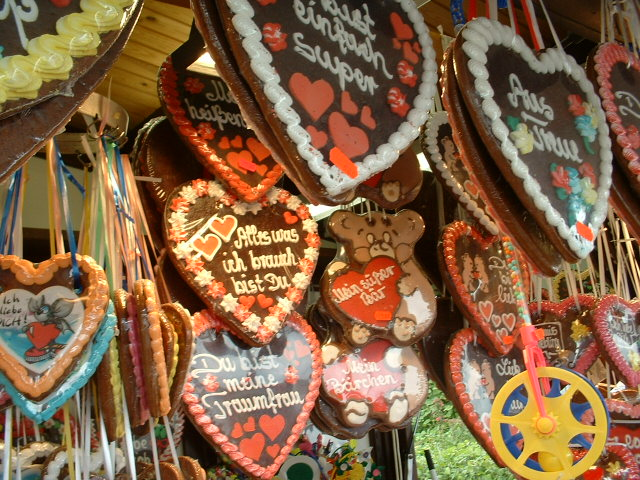
Lebkuchen hearts are sold at fairs.

Lebkuchen is usually soft, but a harder type of Lebkuchen is used to produce Lebkuchenherzen ("Lebkuchen hearts"), usually inscribed with icing, which are available at many German regional fairs and Christmas fairs. They are also sold as souvenirs at the Oktoberfest and are inscribed with affectionate, sarcastic or obscene messages.

Another form is the "witch's house" (Hexenhäusl or Hexenhäuschen), made popular because of the fairy tales about Hansel and Gretel.

The closest German equivalent of the gingerbread man is the Honigkuchenpferd ("honey cake horse").

The Nuremberg type of Lebkuchen is also known as Elisenlebkuchen and must contain no less than 25 percent nuts and less than 10 percent wheat flour. The finest artisan lebkuchen bakeries in Nuremberg boast close to 40% nut content. Lebkuchen is sometimes packaged in richly decorated tins, chests, and boxes, which have become nostalgic collector items.

Several Swiss regional varieties also exist and have been declared part of the Culinary Heritage of Switzerland, such as the case with Berner Honiglebkuchen.

== Gallery ==
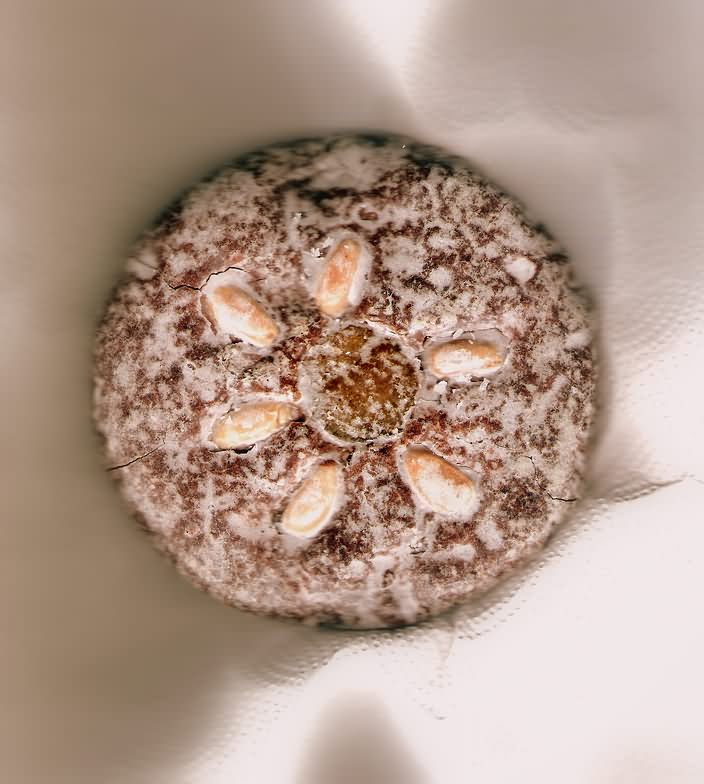
Nürnberger Lebkuchen with almonds and sugar coating, of the Elisen type (Elisenlebkuchen)

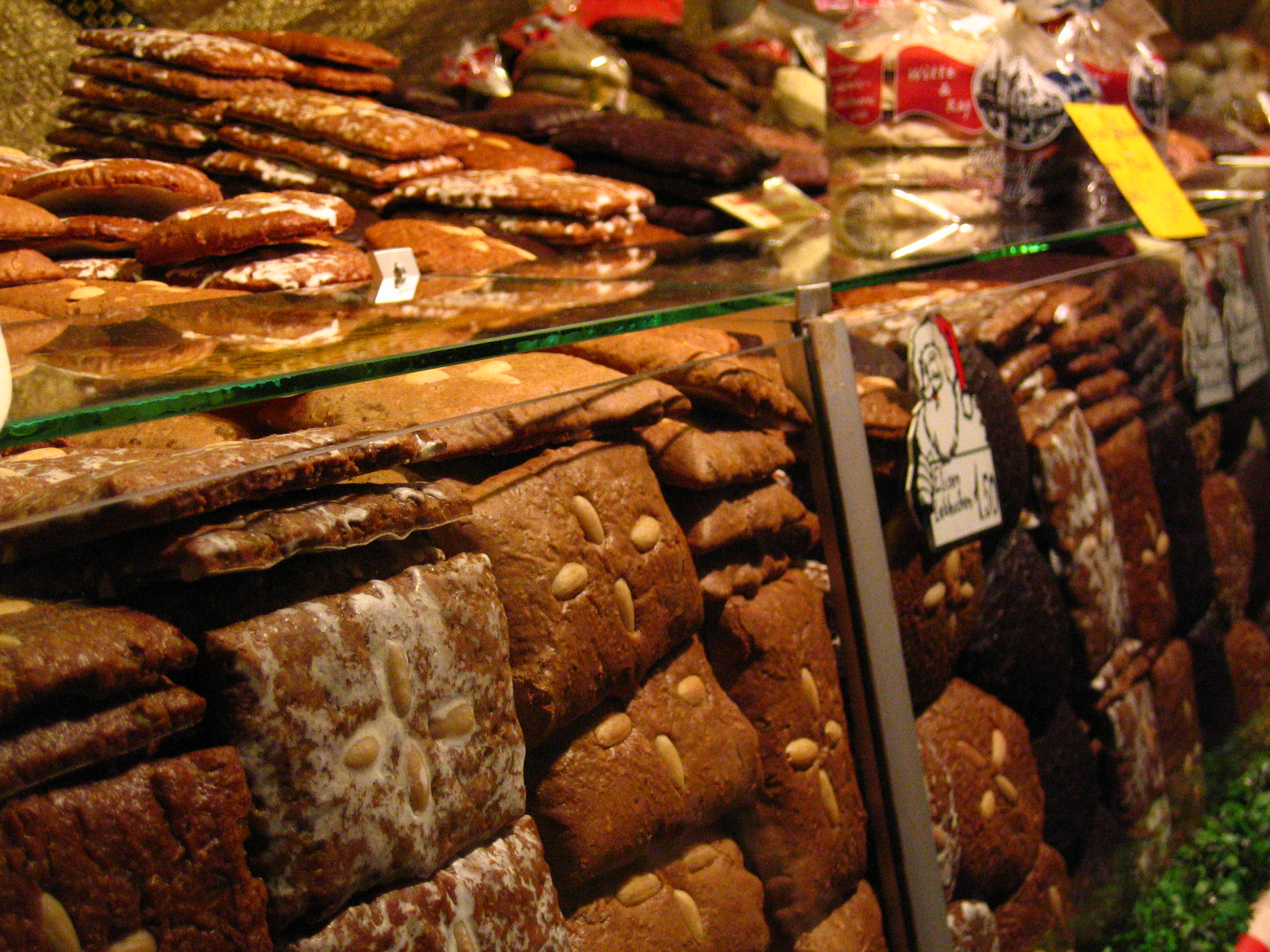
Different shapes of Lebkuchen on sale at the Christkindlesmarkt, Nuremberg

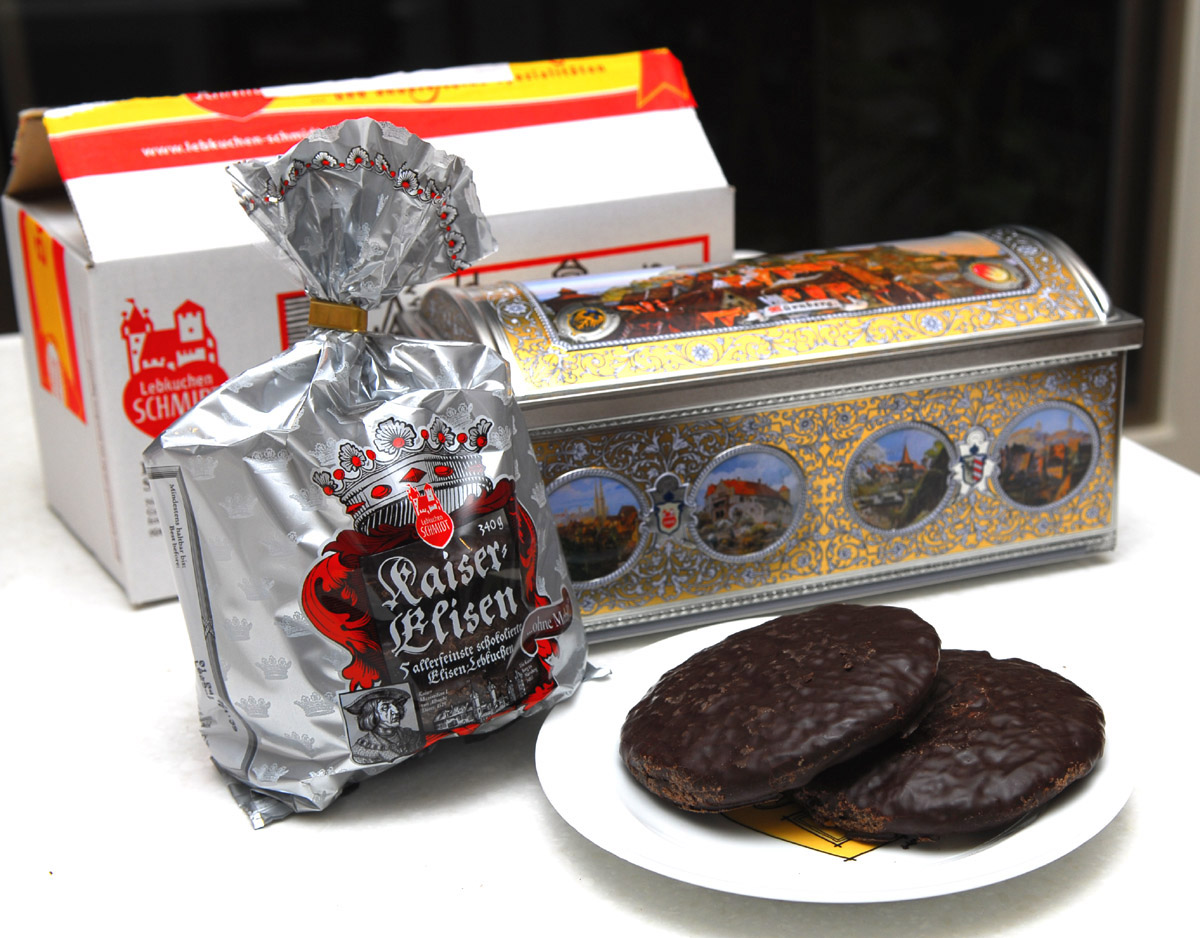
Lebkuchen in retail packaging

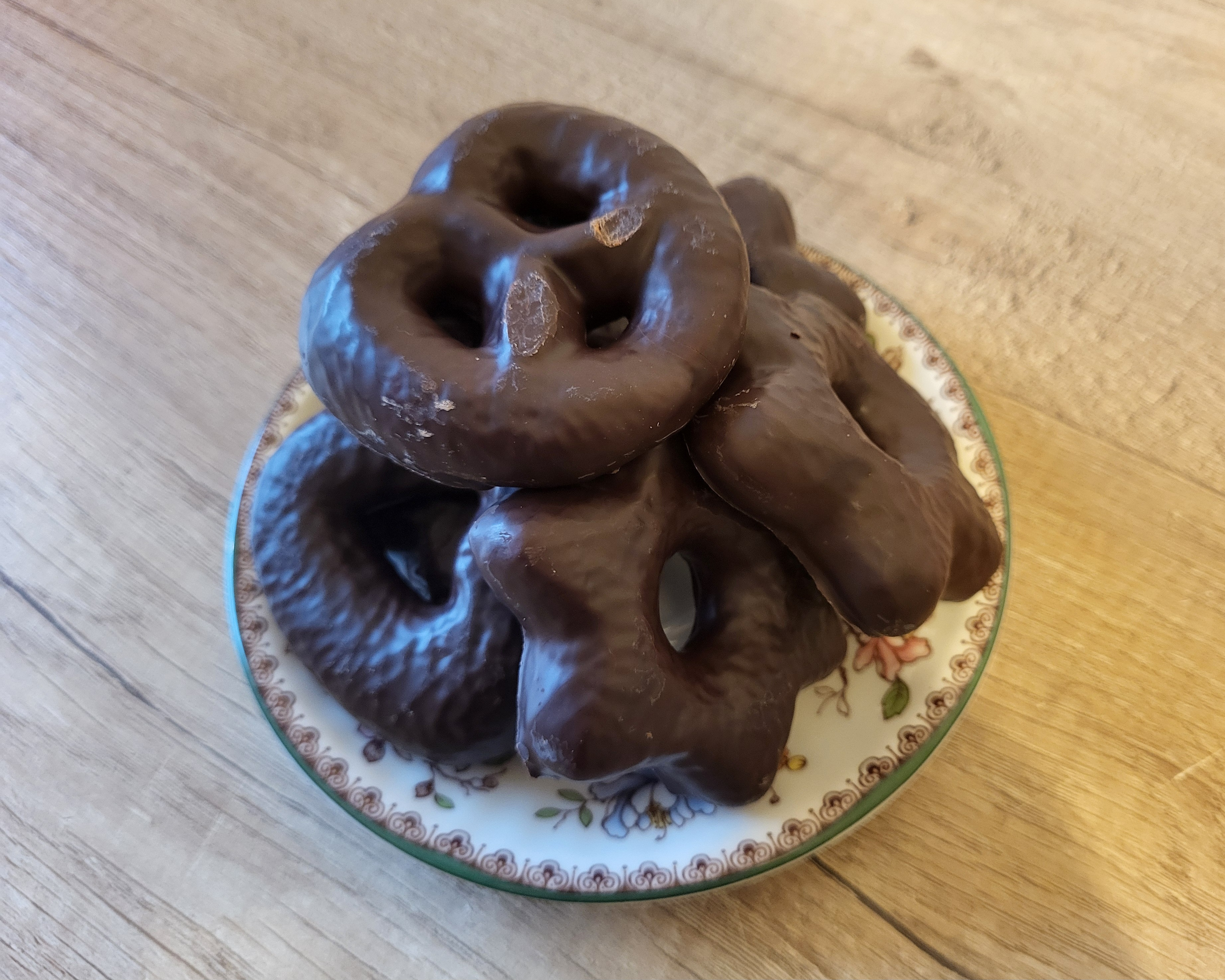
Storebought Lebkuchen

== See also ==
- Aachener Printen
- Basler Läckerli
- Berner Haselnusslebkuchen
- Springerle
- Speculaas
- List of chocolate-covered foods
- List of German desserts
- Licitar
- Pfeffernüsse
- Pryanik
- Toruń gingerbread
