= Edible gold =

Gold processed as a food additive

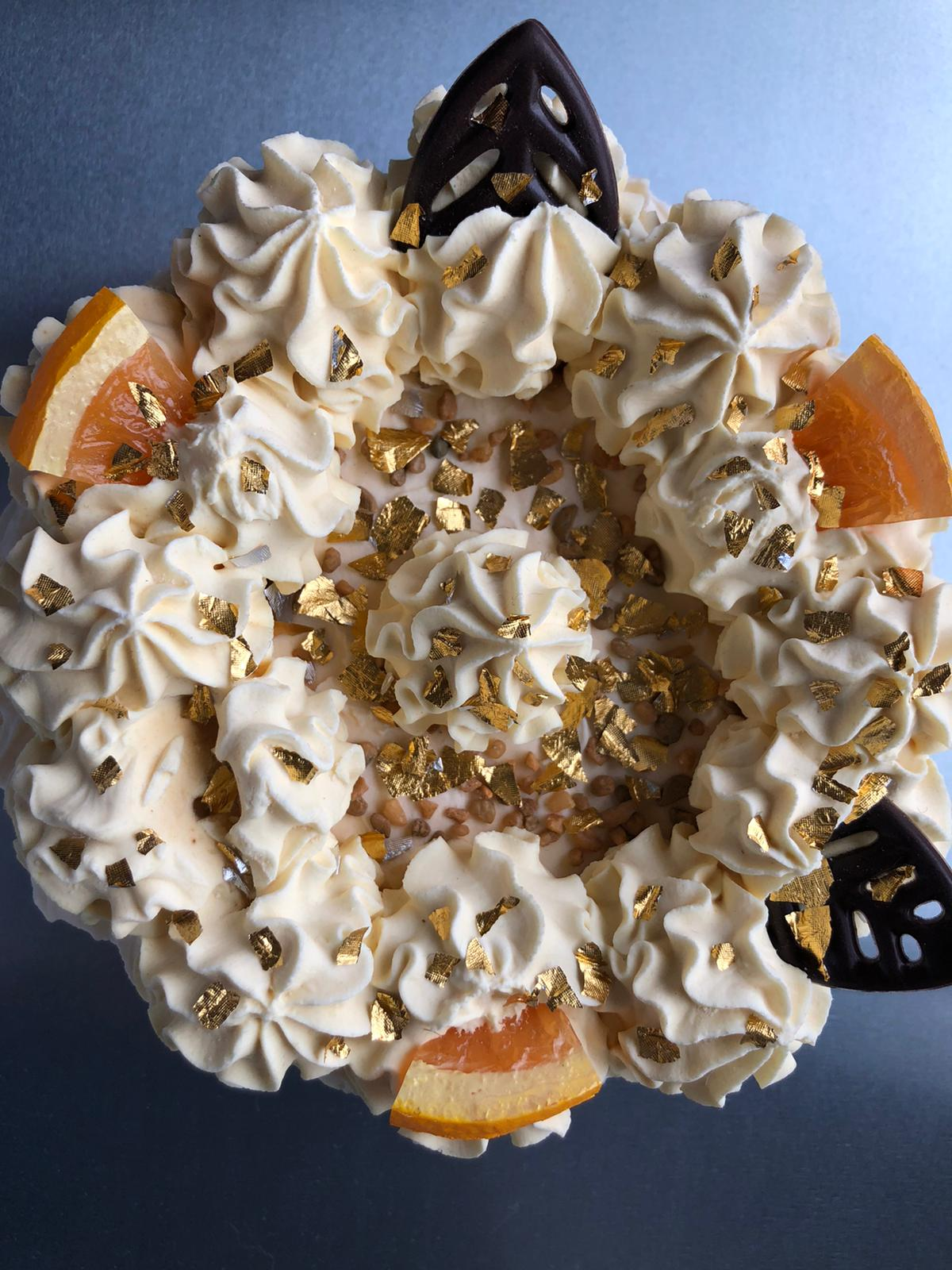
Cake with golden flakes

Edible gold is a particular type of gold authorized by the European Union and the United States as a food additive, under the code E 175. It is used in haute cuisine as part of a trend towards extravagance in meals. It can be employed in foods and beverages such as in cookies decoration, wines or liquors; as sushi garnishment; or over ice cream. There are neither negative effects nor benefits from eating high-carat, food-grade gold since it is biologically inert, and it is usually suitable for use in food since it does not oxidize or corrode in moist air, unlike many other metals.

== Technical specifications and production ==
Edible gold must fulfill the specifications from the applicable food safety standards. It has to be pure, to avoid any type of infections or perils for the body. Gold usually undergoes one of these processes: it could be hammered, or pounded and rolled, or just a leaf or powder. In the first case, the gold needs to reach the measure of about 1/8000 of a millimeter thick, in the second one it could be used as a normal leaf (the measure depends on the purpose) or smashed in powder.

== History ==
Edible gold has been used since ancient times and can be found in many regions of the world and in different ages. The earliest evidence of the use of edible gold is among the ancient Egyptians, almost 5000 years ago, where the use of gold was well-known in many fields. The Egyptians used the gold for mental, bodily and spiritual purification because they believed it to have divine effects. The alchemists of Alexandria developed various medicines and elixirs with drinkable gold, which they believed restored and rejuvenated the body. It is believed that Cleopatra had body treatments with gold every night, such as having baths with gold and using a face mask of pure gold.

Ancient Egyptians were not the only ones to use gold as a decorative food and beverage garnish; it could also be found in Japan, China and India, mostly for medicine as made by court physicians.

Edible gold was famous among the courts of the kings of European countries in the Middle Ages, implemented as food decoration and as symbol of extreme luxury and prestige among vassals and courtiers. Ancient court physicians believed that gold helped with arthritis and other body problems such as sore limbs.

During the Renaissance, Paracelsus (1493–1541) – considered the founder of the modern pharmacology – developed a variety of medicines using few quantities of edible gold in the form of pills or gold powder.

From the Modern age – and until the twentieth century – gold was associated with medicines. It was common to find the application of some piece of gold in articulated and expensive drugs, using little pills or powder inside the medicine, or as a supplement for food to refill minerals in the human body.

== Health effects ==
Gold is a particularly non-reactive element and is not absorbed during the digestion process, so it is safe to eat. However, there are no nutritional or health benefits associated with its consumption. Purity of edible gold must be 23–24 karats, above that used in typical jewelry, which may contain other metals and can be toxic if consumed. The effects and safety of E 175 were first evaluated in 1975 and recently re-evaluated in 2016 by EFSA (European Food Safety Authority) when using the metal as an additive or food coloring. The agency has authorized the use of gold as food additive at quantum satis in the external coating of confectionery, decoration of chocolates and in liqueurs. Nevertheless, it states that:

the specifications for gold (E 175) should include the mean particle size and particle size distribution (± SD), as well as the percentage (in number) of particles in the nanoscale (with at least one dimension below 100 nm), present in the powder form of gold (E 175). The methodology applied should comply with the EFSA Guidance document. Exposure estimates of gold (E 175) reached up to 1.32 µg/kg body weight (bw)/day in the maximum level exposure assessment scenario and up to 0.33 µg/kg bw/day in the refined, non-brand-loyal, exposure scenario.

== Practical details of the applications ==
Edible gold can be used in mainly three different shapes to garnish foods and beverages: leaf-shaped, in flakes or in powder. Among the dishes and beverages in which edible gold is implemented there are cakes and sweet desserts, soups, pastas, risottos, sushi, cocktails and wines. Since it is used as tasteless garnish, edible gold is usually the ingredient at the top of the dish at direct contact with food. In most of the recipes requiring gold in flakes or dust, it is usually dabbed with a knife or sprinkled on the top. Gold is added during the bottling of wines and liqueurs and it is generally mixed during cocktails' preparation. More recently, gold leaves have been used to garnish steak and hamburgers: Hard Rock Café's "24-Karat Gold Leaf Steak Burger" was sold in USA for $7 extra than the one without the metallic garnish. Salt Bae, the chef owner of the Nusr-Et restaurants chain, includes in his menu a steak entirely covered by gold, sold at €650 in Greece.

== In consumer culture ==
Spread through social media has been linked with rising demand for edible gold in the 21st century. As a consequence, conspicuous consumption of luxury became the driver of edible gold consumption and its dissemination in almost every region of the world today.

In 2023, the Muslim Board of Uzbekistan issued a fatwa on the inadmissibility of edible gold offered in the country's restaurants.
