= Kinrara distillery =

Gin distillery in Aviemore, Scotland

Kinrara Distillery
- Location: Lynwilg Farm Steading, Aviemore PH22 1PZ, Scotland, United Kingdom
- Coordinates: 57.1731°N 3.8522°W
- Owner: Kinrara Distillery Limited
- Founded: 2018; 8 years ago
- Founder: Duncan Kirk Fletcher; Kevin Paterson Fletcher
- Status: Operational
- No. of stills: 2 x 100 litre direct fire pot stills
- Website: www.kinraradistillery.com

Kinrara distillery is a gin distillery near Aviemore, Scotland, in the Cairngorms National Park.

== History ==
The distillery is built within a former milking parlour and farm steading. Historically, the area was the private estate of Jane Gordon, Duchess of Gordon, founder of the Gordon Highlanders.

Planning permission was sought for the site in 2017. The distillery started spirit production in 2018. The gin was listed in Lidl supermarkets later that year.

From April 2020, during the Covid-19 pandemic, the distillery produced hand sanitiser for NHS Highland. Sanitiser was also donated to mountain rescue teams and care homes. When restrictions were relaxed, the distillery opened an onsite shop to the public for the first time.

== Products ==
The flagship product is Kinrara Highland Dry gin. Some of the botanicals used, such as rosehips and rowanberries are foraged from the Kinrara Estate.

Several "Artist's Edition" limited edition bottlings have been released, including Freya, which uses local heather as a botanical. A further special edition gin, called Cairngorm Whiteout, was released in support of the Cairngorm Mountain Rescue Team.

== Awards ==
Several Kinrara gins have been regcognised in competition. The core Highland Dry gin won "Best Scottish Contemporary Gin" at both the 2021 and 2022 World Gin Awards. The limited edition "Caper" gin was awarded "Best Signature Botanical Gin" at the World Gin Awards 2025.

The distillery was a finalist in the "Gin Tourist Destination of the Year" category at the Scottish Gin Awards 2023.
