= Christmas cookie =

Sweet biscuits/cookies eaten during the Christmas season

Christmas cookies
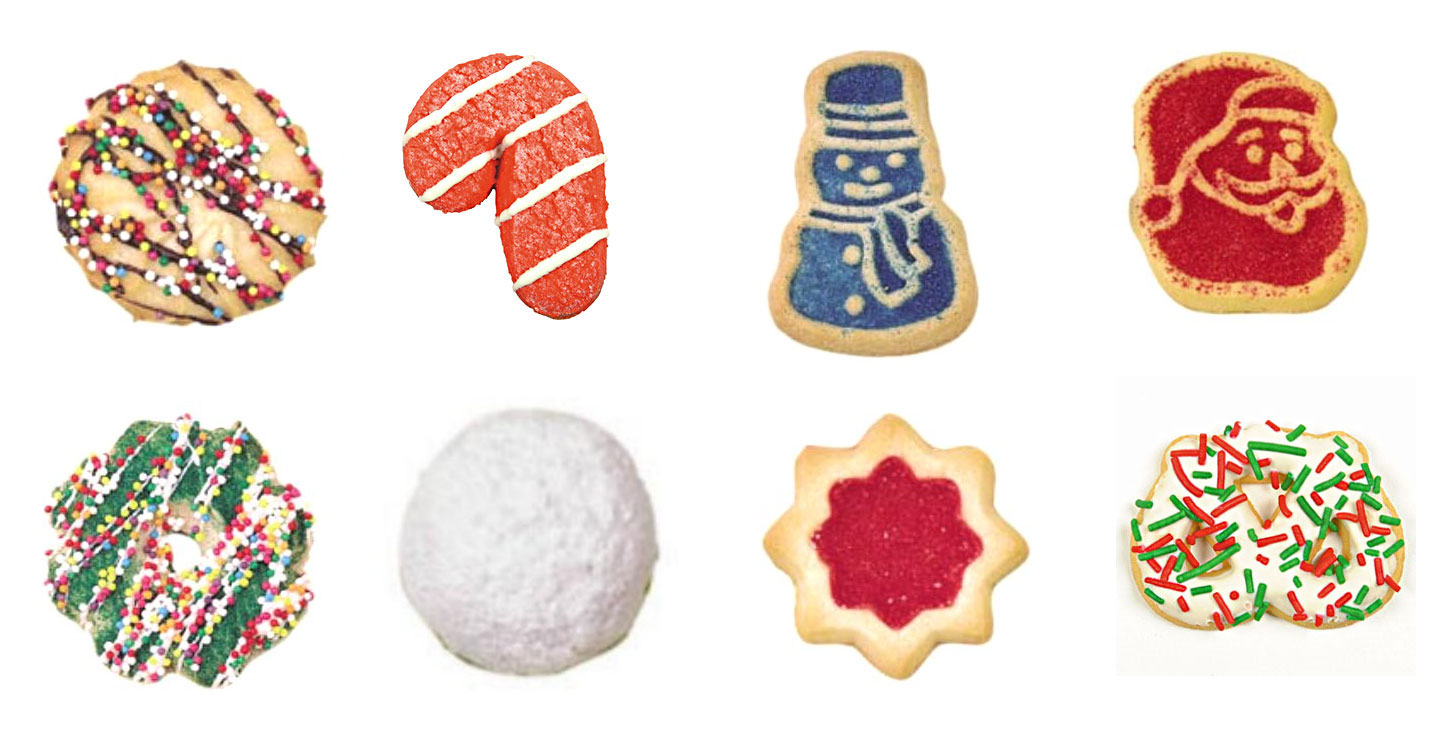
- A variety of decorated North American style Christmas cookies
- Type: Sugar biscuits and cookies

Christmas cookies or Christmas biscuits are traditionally sugar cookies or biscuits cut into various shapes decorated with icing and other toppings related to Christmas. Particular flavours, such as gingerbread, may be used within local or family traditions. In the United States, shaped Christmas cookies became popular at the end of the 19th century with the wide availability of the cookie cutter.

== History ==
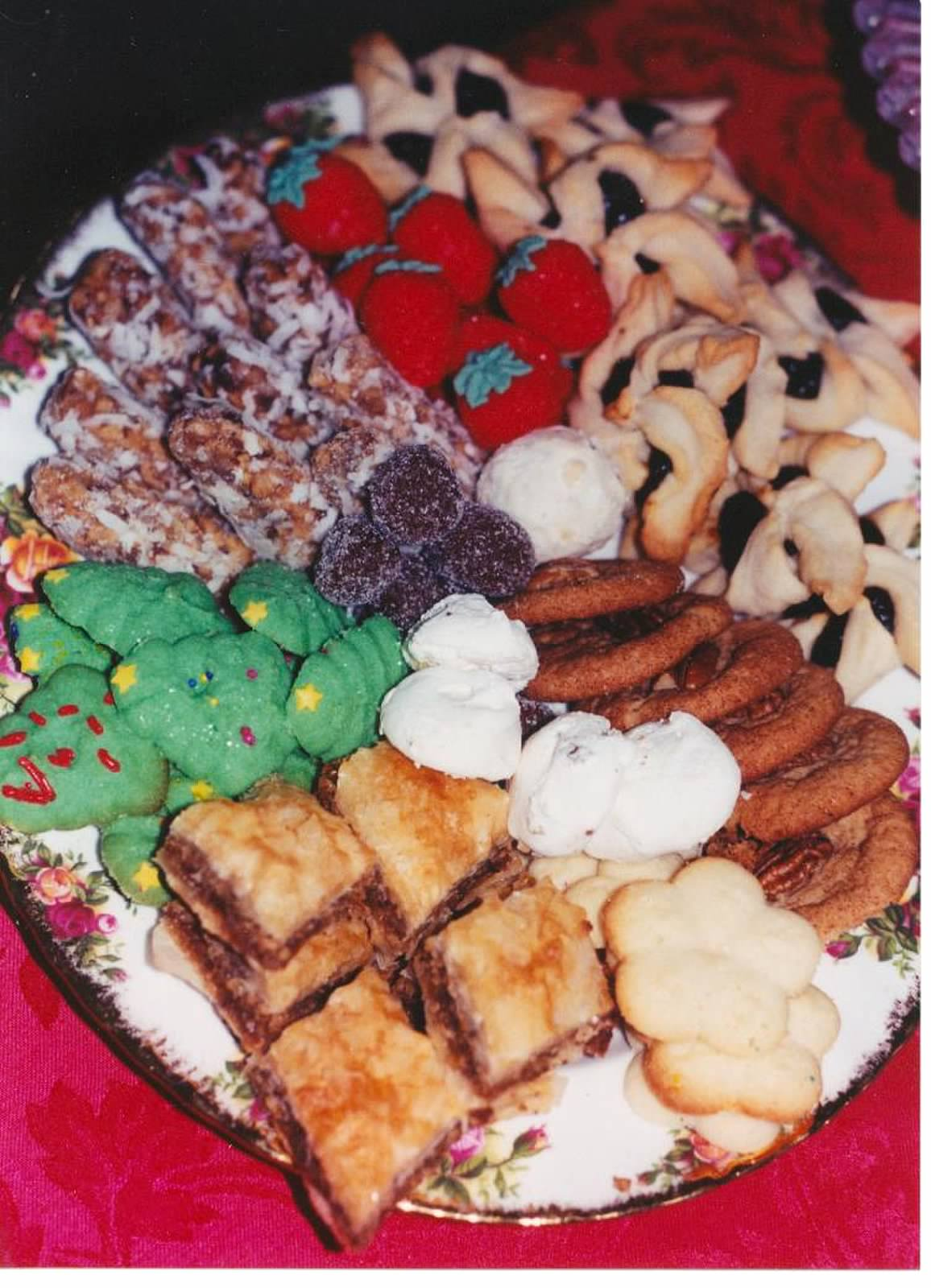
Traditional holiday cookie tray

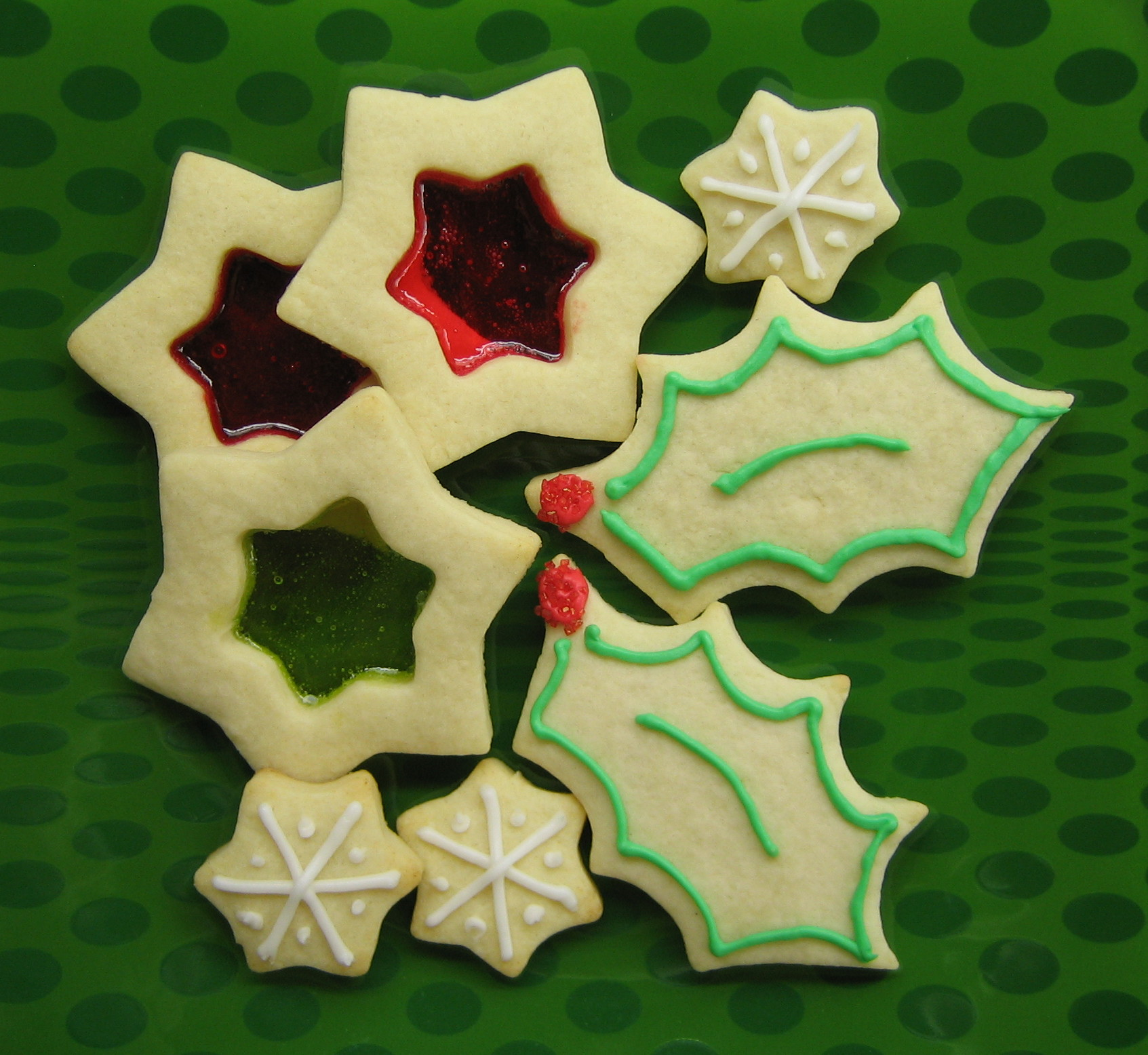
Modern Canadian and American style Christmas cookies

Modern Christmas cookies can trace their history to recipes from Medieval Europe biscuits, when many modern ingredients such as cinnamon, ginger, black pepper, almonds and dried fruit were introduced into the west. By the 16th century Christmas biscuits had become popular across Europe, with Lebkuchen being favoured in Germany and pepparkakor in Sweden, while in Norway krumkake were popular.

The earliest examples of Christmas cookies in the United States were brought by the Dutch in the early 17th century. Due to a wide range of cheap imported products from Germany between 1871 and 1906 following a change to importation laws, cookie cutters became available in American markets. These imported cookie cutters often depicted highly stylised images with subjects designed to hang on Christmas trees. Due to the availability of these utensils, recipes began to appear in cookbooks designed to use them. In the early 20th century, U.S. merchants were also importing decorated Lebkuchen cookies from Germany to be used as presents.

In Canada and the United States, since the 1930s, children have left cookies and milk on a table for Santa Claus on Christmas Eve, though many people simply consume the cookies themselves. The cookies are often cut into the shape of candy canes, reindeer, holly leaves, Christmas trees, stars, or angels.

== Popular Christmas cookies ==
=== Gingerbread ===
Gingerbread has existed in some form since sugars and spices were brought back to Europe, from soldiers in the Crusades. However, it was not until Queen Victoria and Prince Albert included it with a variety of other German Christmas traditions that the gingerbread cookies became primarily associated with Christmas. Gingerbread cookies are also traditional in Alsace.

=== Bredele ===
Bredele are Christmas cookies in the Alsatian cuisine of France.

=== Chocolate crinkle ===
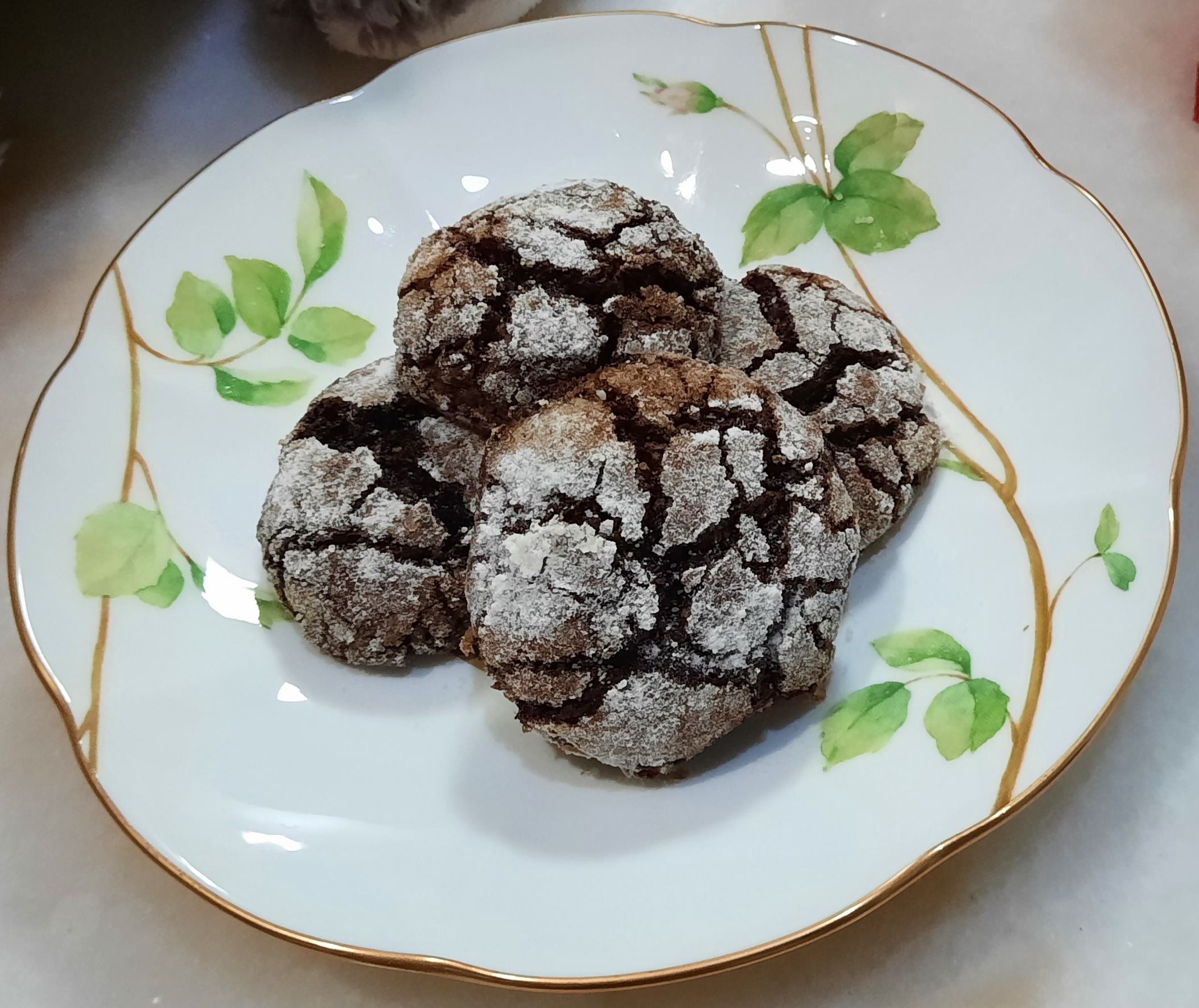
Chocolate crinkles

Chocolate crinkles are Christmas cookies from Saint Paul, Minnesota, United States. The cookie's name is derived from a crackle of its cookie because while baking the dough expands and flattens while the coated powdered sugar cracks, giving it a crinkle effect, making it resemble a snowflake. Thus, the cookie is an icon for a Christmas treat for it reminds one of winter due to its resemblance of soil covered with snow.

=== Fattigmann ===
A traditional cookie which dates from the Middle Ages in Norway, Fattigmann cookies are deep fried in unsalted fat.

=== Kerstkransjes ===
Kerstkransjes are traditional Christmas cookies from the Netherlands. They are round with a hole in the middle. The most usual type uses almond chips as decoration.

=== Krumkake ===
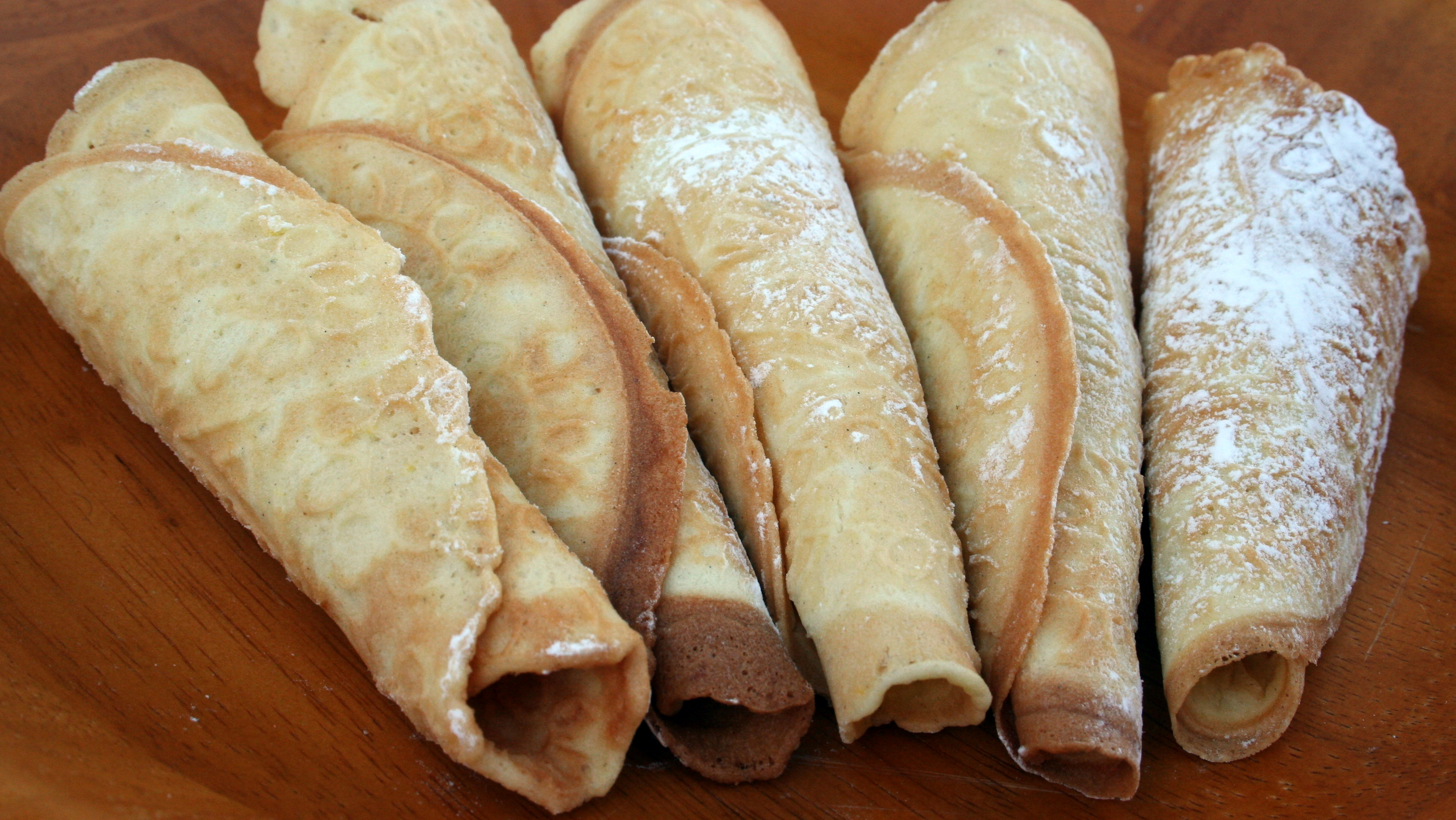
Five cone shaped krumkaker

Krumkaker are traditional cookies from Norway. They were originally baked over open fires using decorative irons; however modern cooks use electric or stovetop irons to bake these wafer-thin biscuits. Krumkaker owe their name, which means "bent cake" or "twisted cake", to the fact that they are wrapped in a cone shape.

=== Pepparkakor ===
Pepparkakor are crisp, thin gingersnap biscuits from Sweden, traditionally cut out in flower and heart shapes.

=== Pfeffernüsse ===
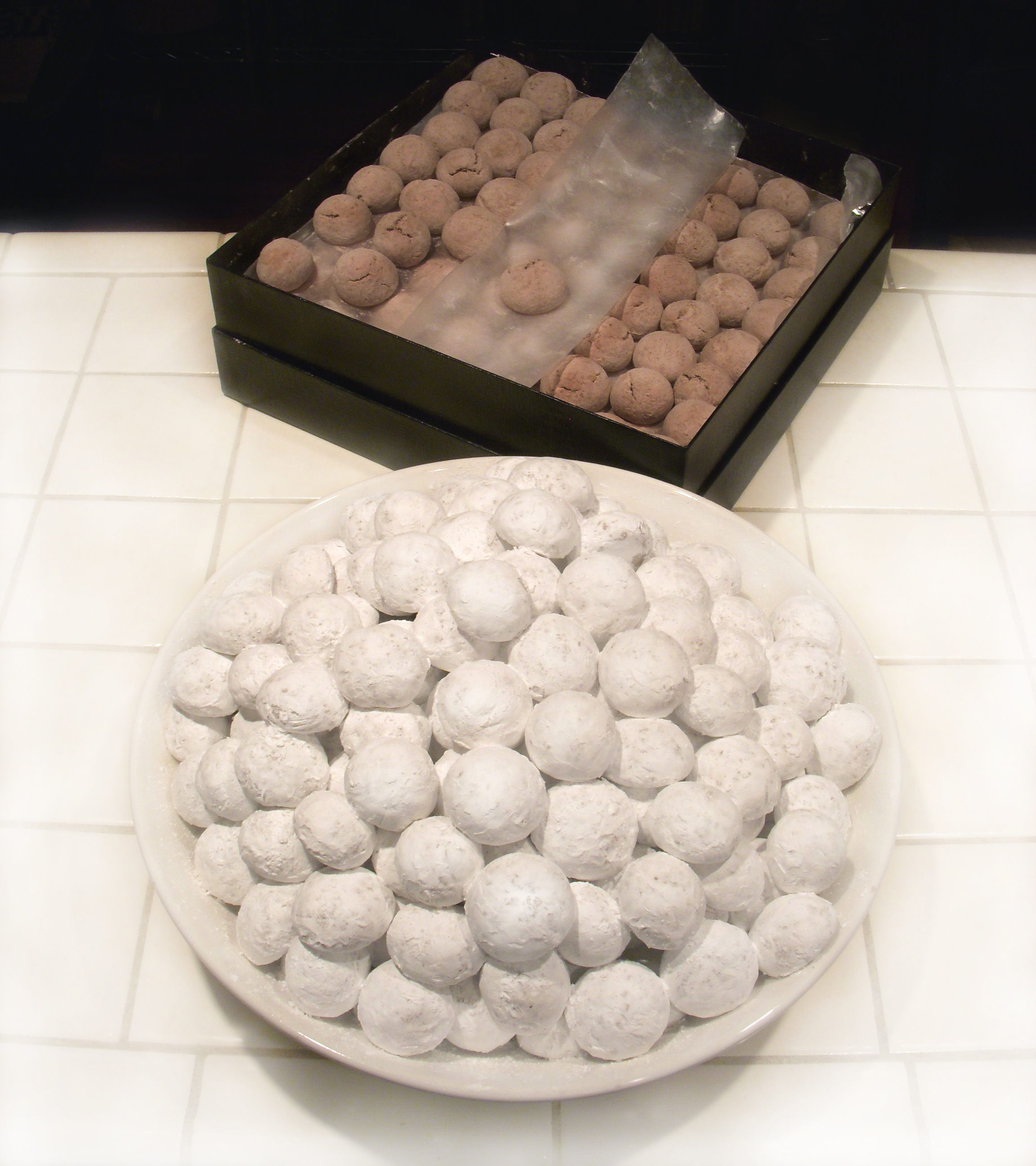
Two batches of pfeffernüsse: sugar-coated in bowl, cocoa-coated in box.

Pfeffernüsse originate in Scandinavia and date from medieval times when spices were used exclusively in holiday baking.

=== Repostería ===
Repostería is a Mexican type of shortbread-like cookie that is lightly baked and dipped into a cinnamon sugar blend until the cinnamon sugar surrounds the cookie. These are often served with coffee or hot spiced Mexican chocolate.

=== Sandbakkels ===
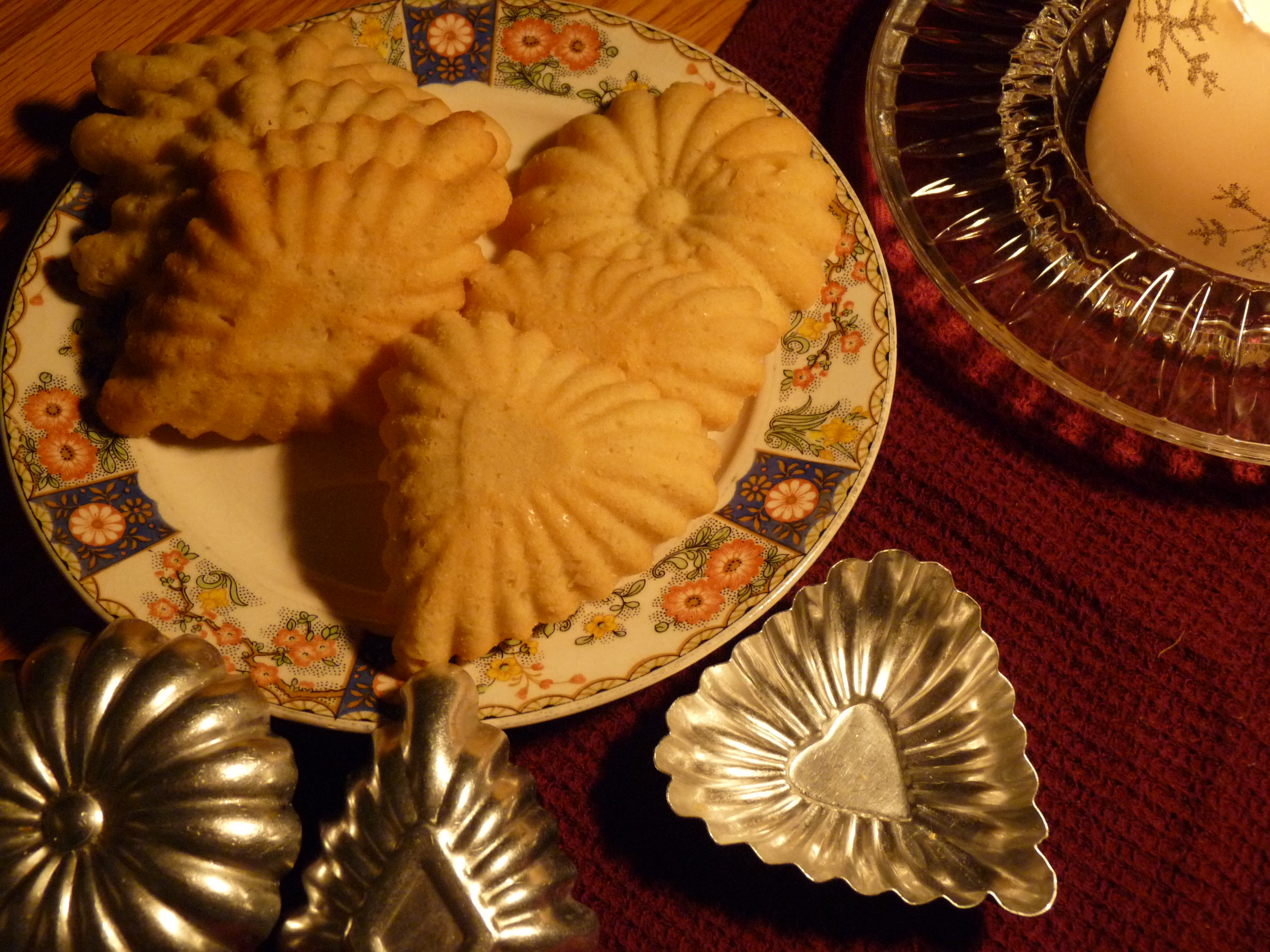
Sandbakelse and tins

Sandbakelse are sugar cookies from nineteenth century Norway. The dough is pressed into tins, and then baked in an oven.

=== Springerle ===
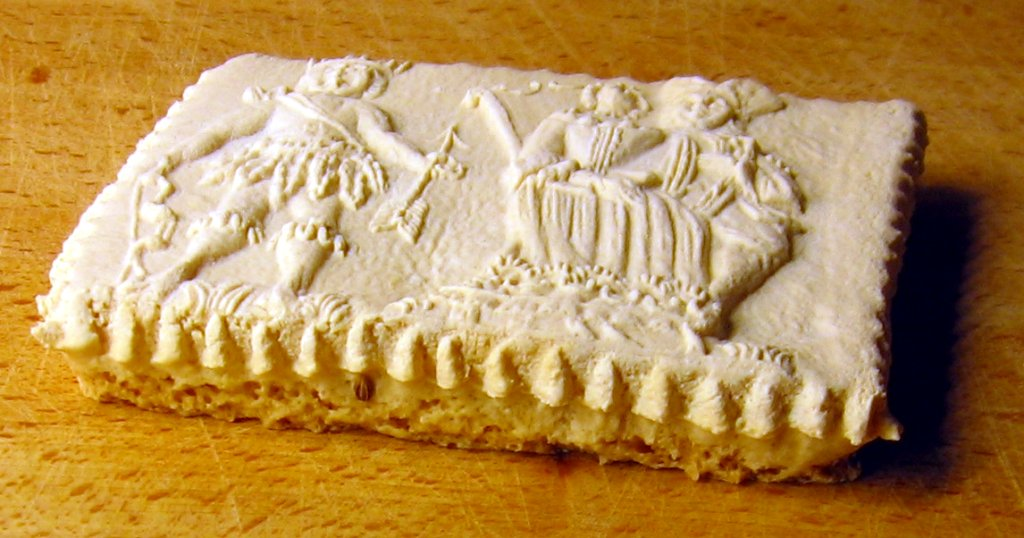
A traditional Austrian springerle

Springerle have been traditional Christmas cookies in south Germany (Bavaria and Baden-Württemberg) and Austria for centuries. They are anise-flavored cookies made from an egg-flour-sugar dough. They are usually made in simple shapes, such as rectangles or circles.

After shaping, they usually have a picture or design pressed into the soft dough with specially carved rolling pins or presses. After they are baked, the designs are sometimes colored if the intention is to use the cookies as decorations.

=== Sugar cookies ===
Also called Amish sugar cookies or Nazareth sugar cookies, the modern sugar cookie was created by the Moravians, who settled in the Nazareth area from Germany during the mid-18th century. Pennsylvania adopted the Nazareth sugar cookie as the official state cookie in 2001.

== See also ==
- Berner Haselnusslebkuchen
- Chocolate chip cookie
- Pizzelle
- Spritzgebäck
- Florentine Biscuit
- Tirggel from Zurich, Switzerland
- Kourabiedes
- Melomakarono
