= Gabriel Kreuther (restaurant) =

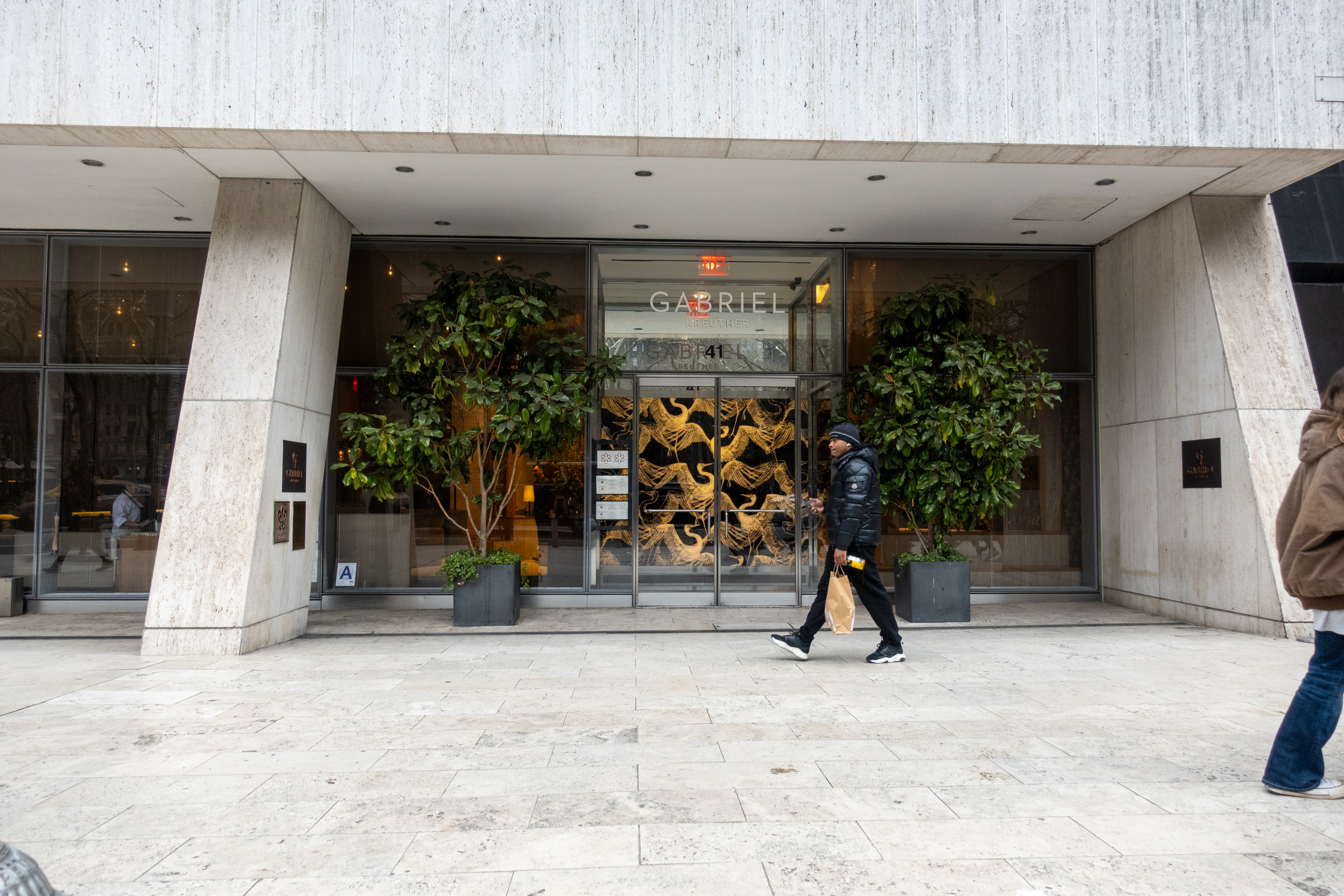
- Entrance to restaurant
- Interactive map of Gabriel Kreuther

Restaurant information
- Established: 2015
- Owner: Gabriel Kreuther
- Head chef: Gabriel Kreuther
- Pastry chef: Marc Aumont
- Food type: Alsatian (French/German) with American influences
- Dress code: Business Casual
- Rating: Michelin Guide; AAA Five Diamond Award (2015–2023)
- Location: W. R. Grace Building at 41 West 42nd Street across from Bryant Park in Midtown, Manhattan, New York City, Manhattan, New York, 10036, United States
- Coordinates: 40°45′15.83″N 73°58′57.27″W
- Seating capacity: 85; 150 (including standing room)
- Reservations: Required (dinner); Recommended (otherwise)
- Website: www.gknyc.com

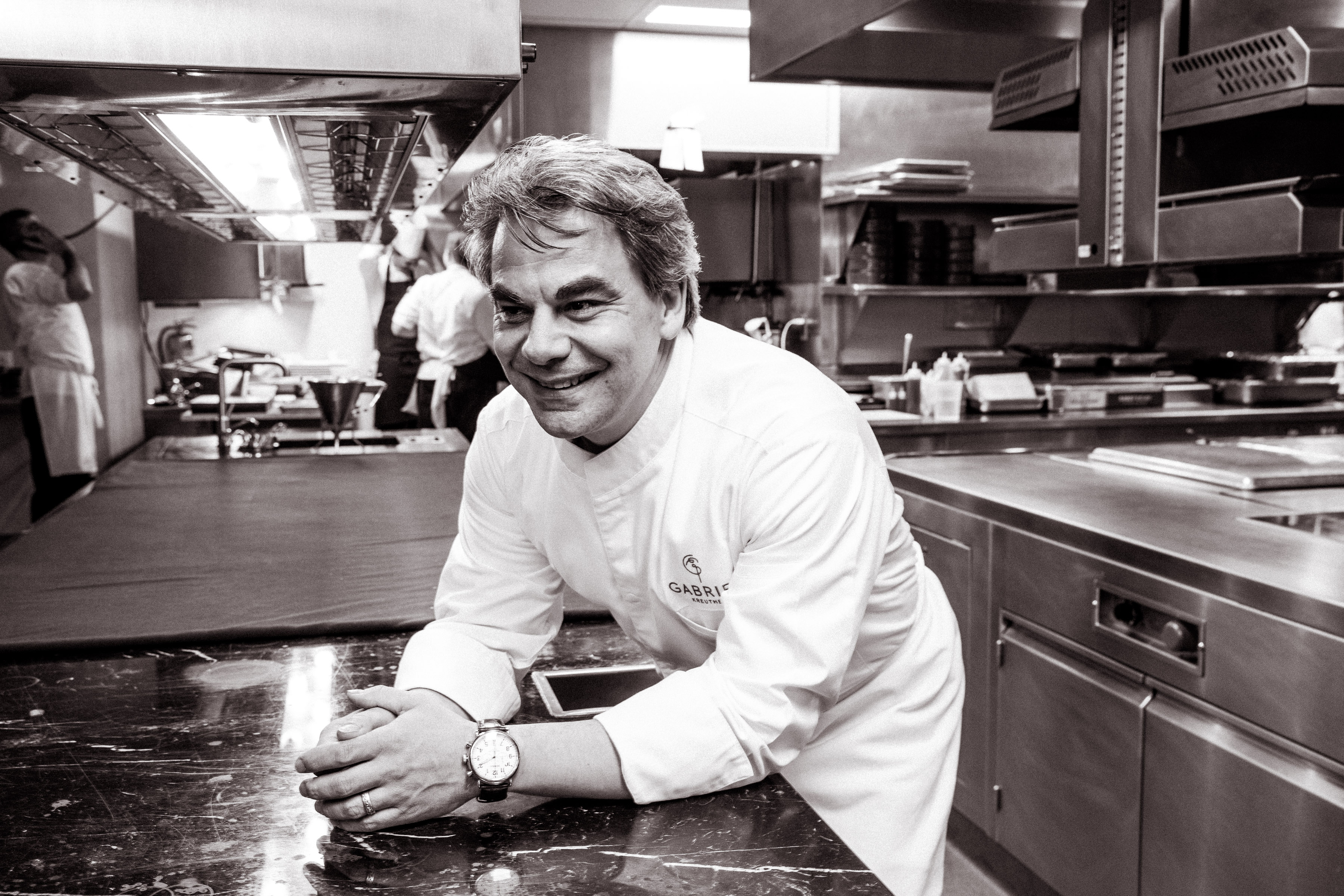

Gabriel Kreuther is a two-Michelin-star restaurant in Manhattan named after its chef and owner, Gabriel Kreuther. It specializes in modern Alsatian food with other French, German, and American influences.

== Menu ==
Gabriel Kreuther specializes in modern Alsatian food with other French, German, and American influences. It offers a more casual, less expensive lunch menu, and also has a large bar and lounge serving cocktails and lighter or small dishes. For evening dining, the restaurant serves a four-course dinner. Also available are tasting menus of six or nine courses.

Their most famous dish is a sturgeon and sauerkraut tart with a caviar mousseline smoked in applewood. Some of the restaurant's other main-course options include langoustine tartare with flying fish roe, cauliflower, and macadamia puree; terrine of creamy foie gras with brittle black truffled praline served with cider-poached quince, pomegranate and chestnut cornbread; or hamachi with black truffles and foie gras in millefeulle pastry.

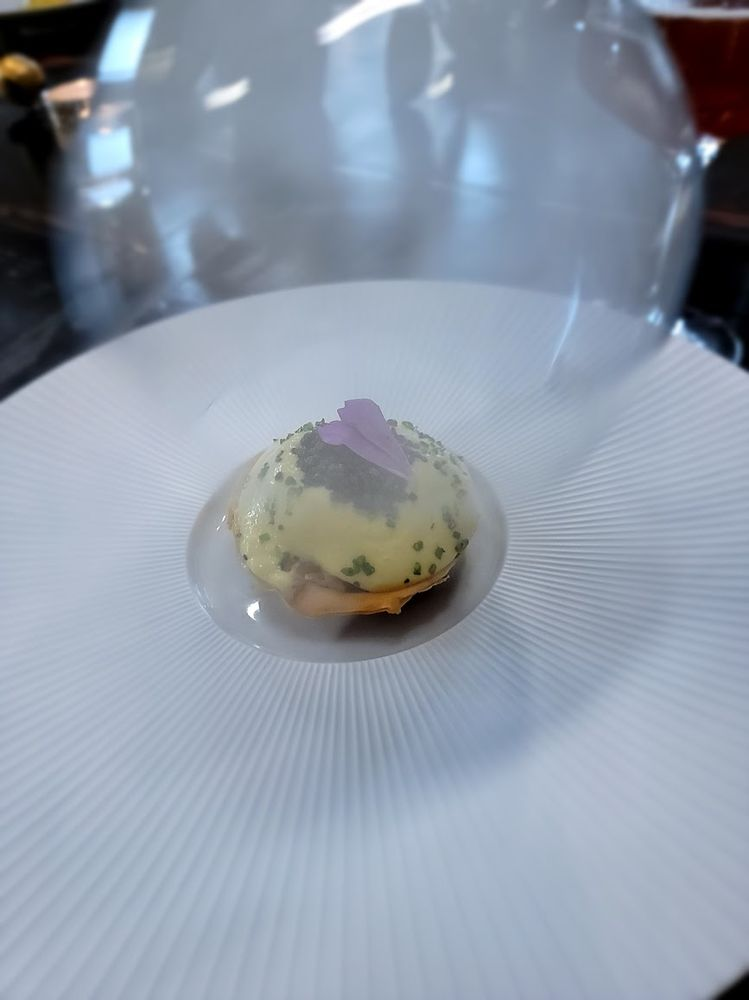
Signature dish. Sturgeon & Sauerkraut tart • applewood smoke • sabayon • imperial kaluga caviar.

All diners are served at least one amuse-bouche and a variety of breads. The restaurant stocks a wine list of 1,800 selections. For the fourth course diners choose either cheese or dessert.

The bar has its own lighter menu ranging from snacks to tartes flambées and large plates.

While the restaurant is haute cuisine, the dress code is business casual; Kreuther has stated "My intent was always to have a comfortable environment where people feel good in it and bring it really down to earth", so he eliminated the need for diners to wear formal wear, a business suit, or tie or jacket.

== Awards and accolades ==
Gabriel Kreuther received its first Michelin star in 2015 shortly after opening.

The New York Times awarded the restaurant three stars in 2015.

The Village Voice named it Best New Restaurant in 2015.

AAA Five Diamond Award (2012–2025).

In 2016 the restaurant was rated by Grub Street as having the best bar food in the city.

It has been on Wine Enthusiast's annual list of America's 100 Best Wine Restaurants multiple times since 2016.

The restaurant first entered Zagat's list of the best restaurants in New York City in October 2016.

It has been a member of the Relais & Châteaux association since 2017.

Business Insider included it in its list of "The 50 best restaurants in America" in 2017.

New York Magazine awarded it an 86/100 in 2019.

In 2019, it gained a second star by Michelin.

In 2020, the restaurant was inducted into Les Grandes Tables du Monde.

In 2022, it won the Grand Award from Wine Spectator.

In 2023, the restaurant received the highest rating, five stars, in Forbes Travel Guide, and it was included in The New York Times' list of the "100 Best Restaurants of New York City".

== Former chocolate store ==
Marc Aumont, the restaurant's pastry chef, opened Kreuther Handcrafted Chocolate next door to the restaurant in 2016. It specializes in a variety of different flavored truffles/bonbons as well as "cheesecake" macarons, a chocolate-tasting menu, and a variety of pastries and drinks. Their bourbon chocolate bar won silver at The International Chocolate Awards. Multiple of their other truffles, such as their pumpkin sesame mole and forbidden rice, have won awards from there as well. More locally, their Middle Eastern Crunch, a halvah and pistachio bar, was noted by New York Magazine. Their iced hot chocolate is noted as one of the best in the city by the New York Post. Eater awarded it one of the top chocolate shops in America as well. During the COVID-19 pandemic, the store closed in February 2020, and they now sell their chocolates and pastries via their website.

== See also ==
- List of Michelin-starred restaurants in New York City
