= Alsatian cuisine =

Culinary traditions of the Alsace region of France

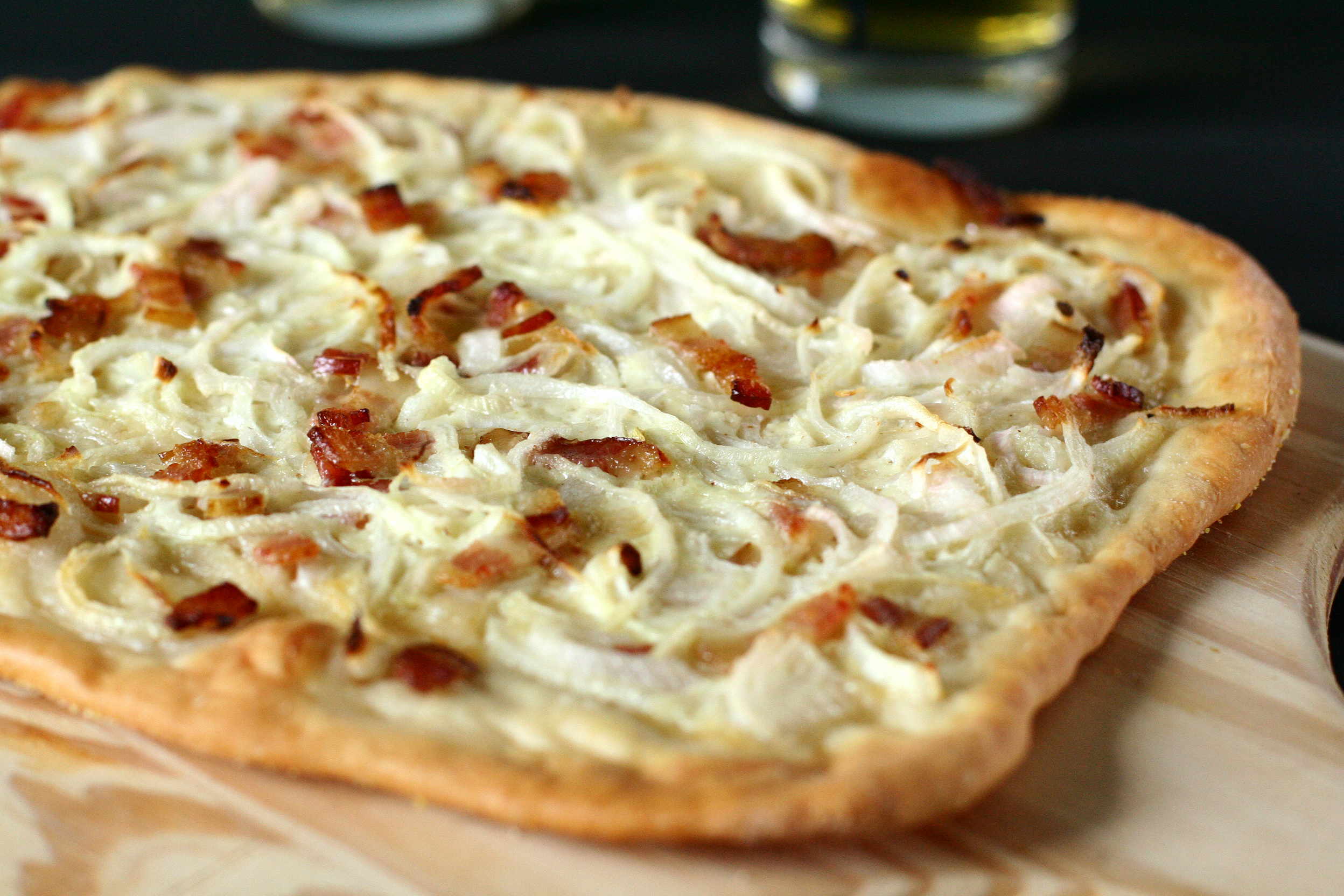
Tarte flambée alsacienne (Flammekueche)

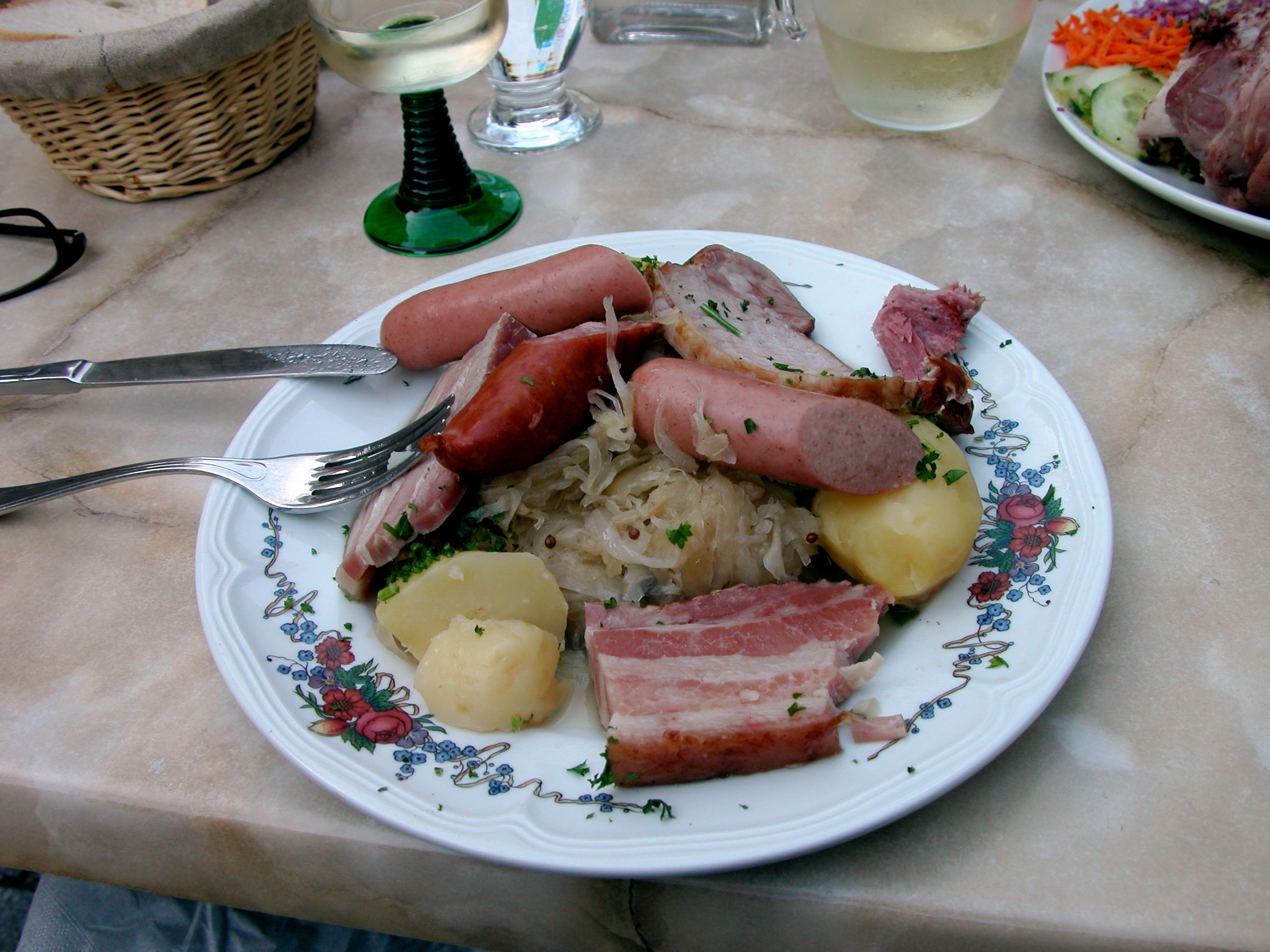
Choucroute Alsacienne (Alsatian sauerkraut)

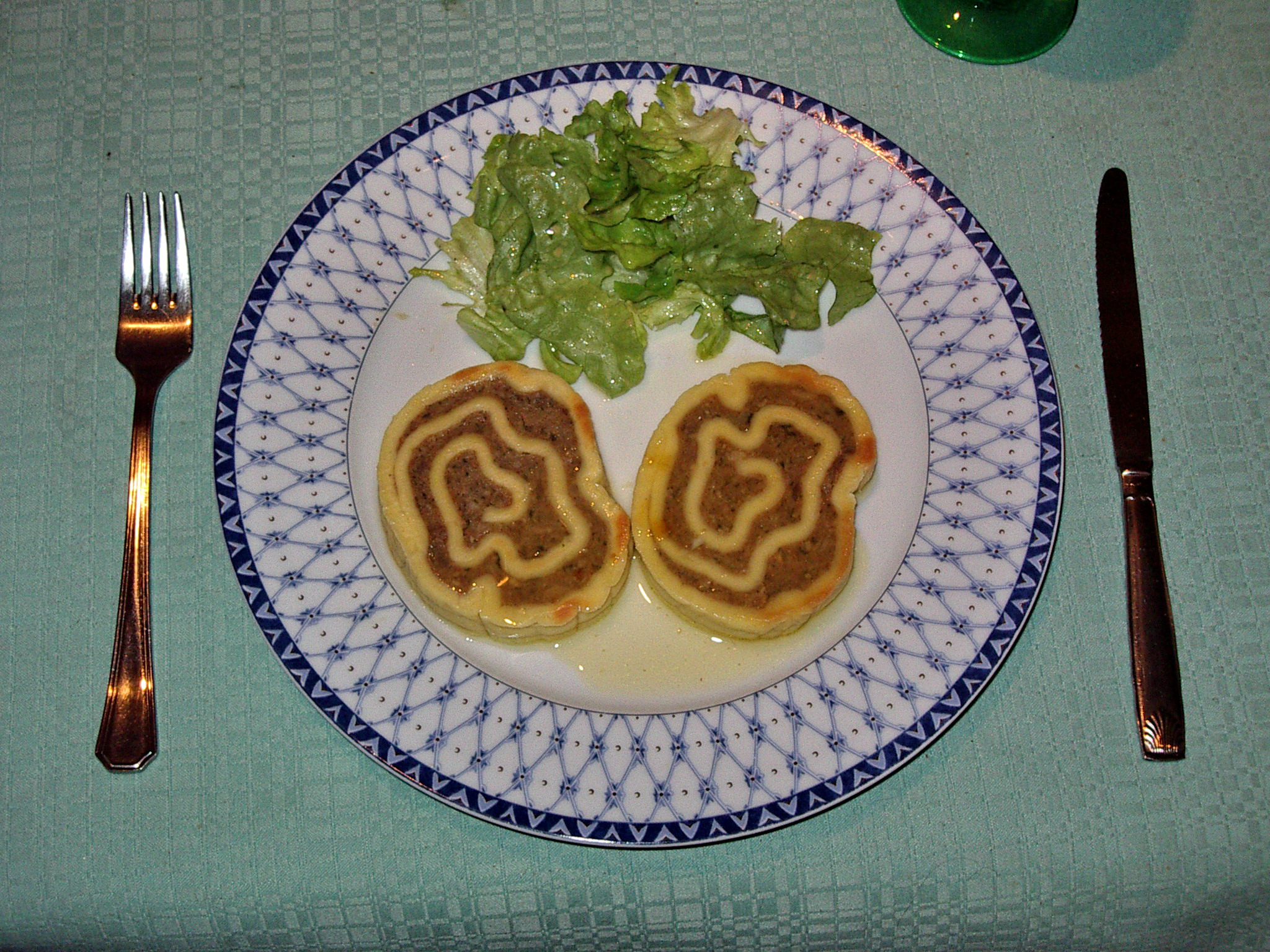
Fleischschnacka

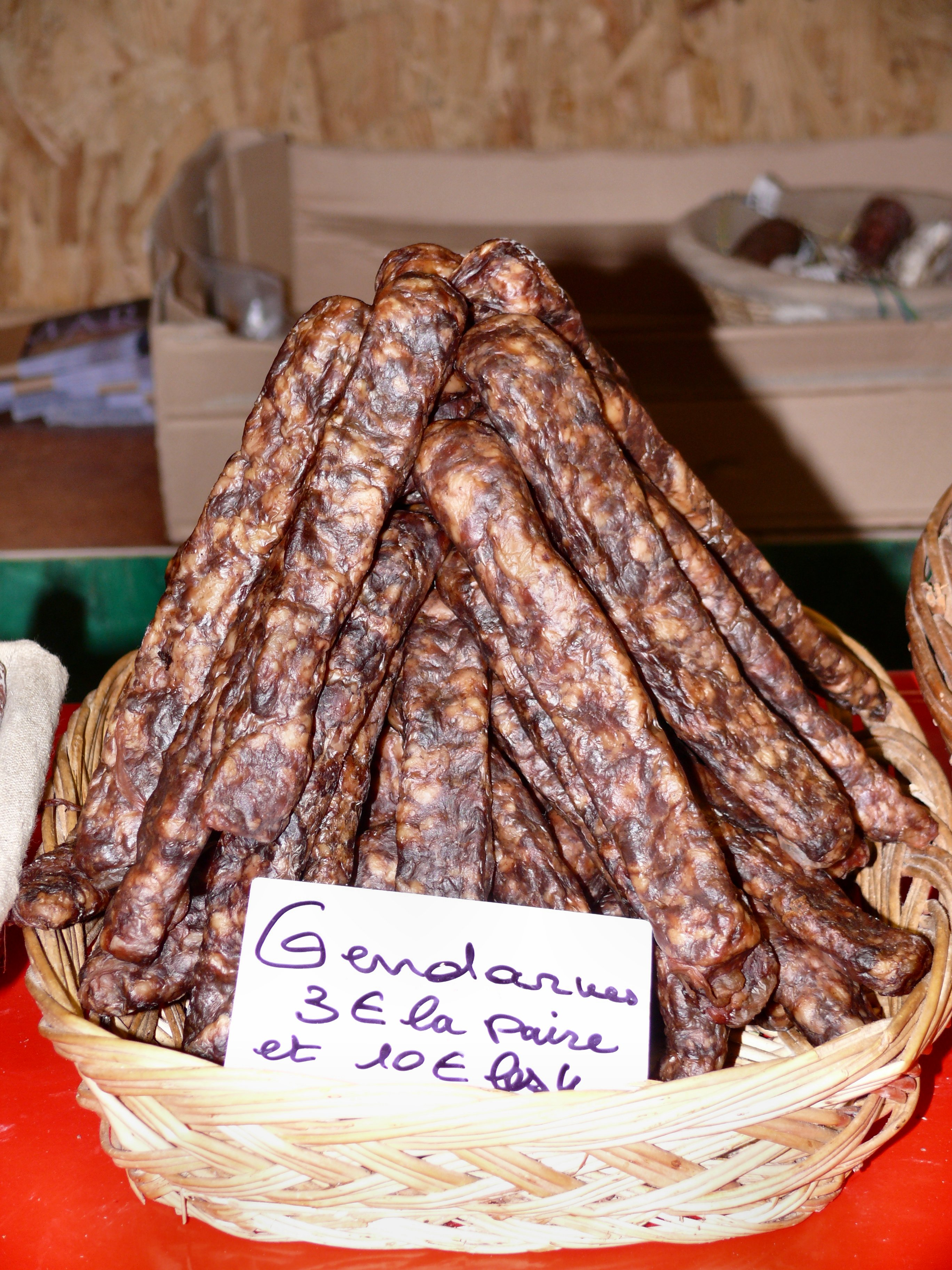
Gendarme ("Policeman"), also known as Landjäger, a traditional Alsatian smoked sausage made with beef and pork sold at a Christmas market at Colmar, Haut-Rhin, Alsace, France

Alsatian cuisine, the cuisine of the Alsace region of France, incorporates Germanic culinary traditions and is marked by the use of pork in various forms. The region is also known for its wine and beer.

== Food ==
=== Savory specialties ===
Traditional dishes include baeckeoffe, flammekueche, choucroute, cordon bleu, Vol-au-vent, spaetzle, fleischnacka, bretzel, bibeleskäs and Zewelwaï The region's version of coq au vin is coq au Riesling. Southern Alsace, also called the Sundgau, is characterized by carpe frite (that also exists in Yiddish tradition, known as gefilte fish). Alsace is also well known for its foie gras made in the region since the 17th century.

A gastronomic symbol of the région is choucroute, a local variety of Sauerkraut. The word Sauerkraut in Alsatian has the form sûrkrût, as in other southwestern German dialects, and means "sour cabbage" as its Standard German equivalent. This word was included into the French language as choucroute. To make it, the cabbage is finely shredded, layered with salt and juniper and left to ferment in wooden barrels. Sauerkraut can be served with poultry, pork, sausage or even fish (choucroute de la mer). Traditionally it is served with pork, Strasbourg sausage or frankfurters, bacon, smoked pork or smoked Morteau or Montbéliard sausages or a selection of pork products. Served alongside are often steamed potatoes.

Another famous dish is the baeckeoffe, a dish made from potatoes, vegetables, as well as three different meats (pork, lamb and beef). Everything is cooked together in the oven in a terrine with Alsace white wine and herbs during several hours.

The flammekueche (tarte flambée) is also very popular in Alsace. It is sometimes called the Alsatian pizza but its dough is much thinner. It is traditionally filled with a mixture of crème fraîche and fromage blanc, bacon strips and onions.

Additionally, Alsace is known for its fruit juices, mineral waters and wines.

=== Sweet specialties and bakery ===
Sweet specialties of Alsace include kougelhopf, German-style cheesecake (called fromage blanc tart), Mont-Blanc (called torche aux marrons in Alsace) and streusel.

The festivities of the year's end involve the production of a great variety of biscuits and small cakes called bredala, as well as pain d'épices (gingerbread) which are baked around Christmas time and manala (a brioche in the shape of a little guy) which are traditionally baked for Saint Nicholas Day (on the 6th of December).

== Wine ==
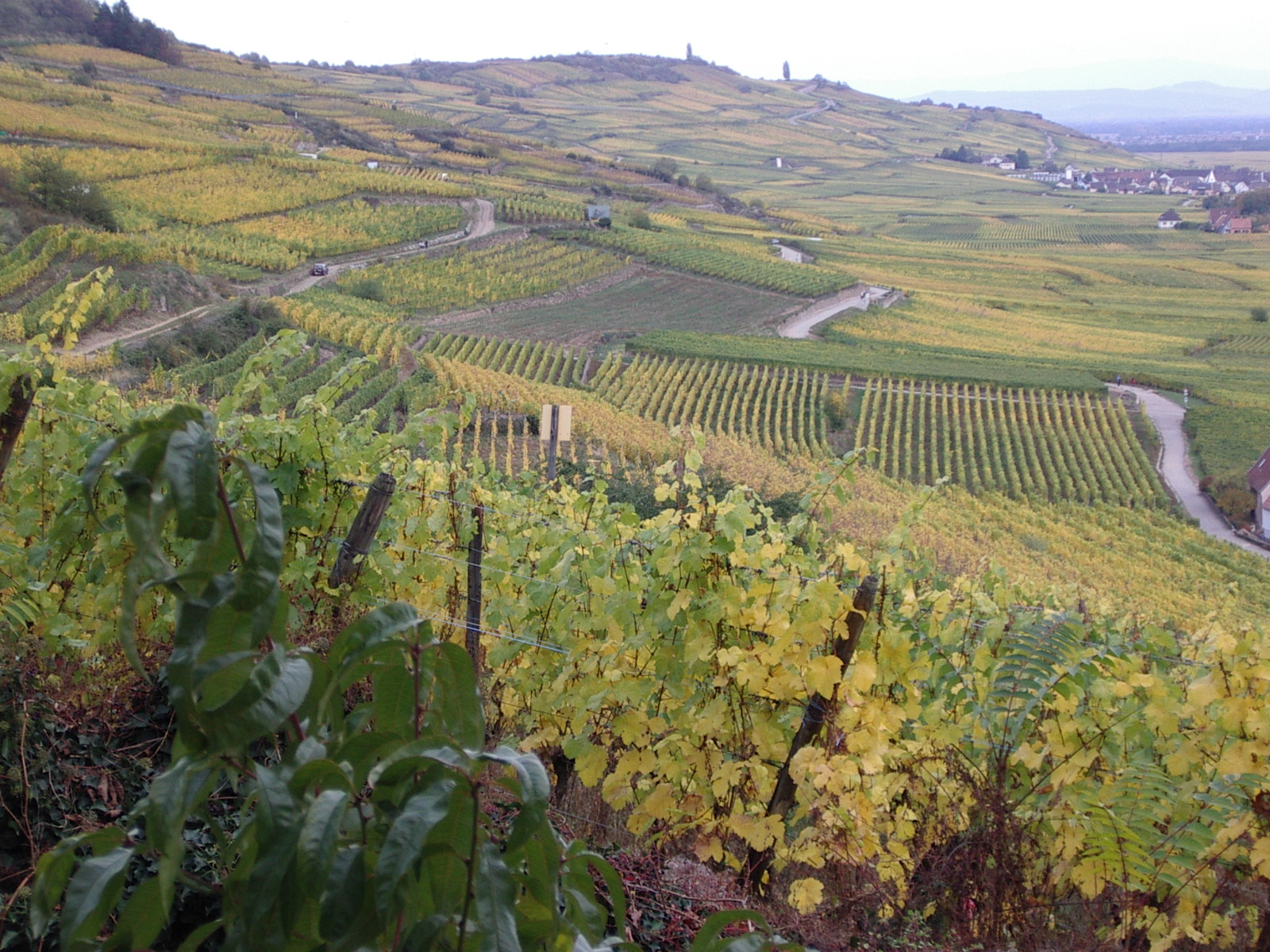
Vineyards close to the village Kaysersberg in Alsace.

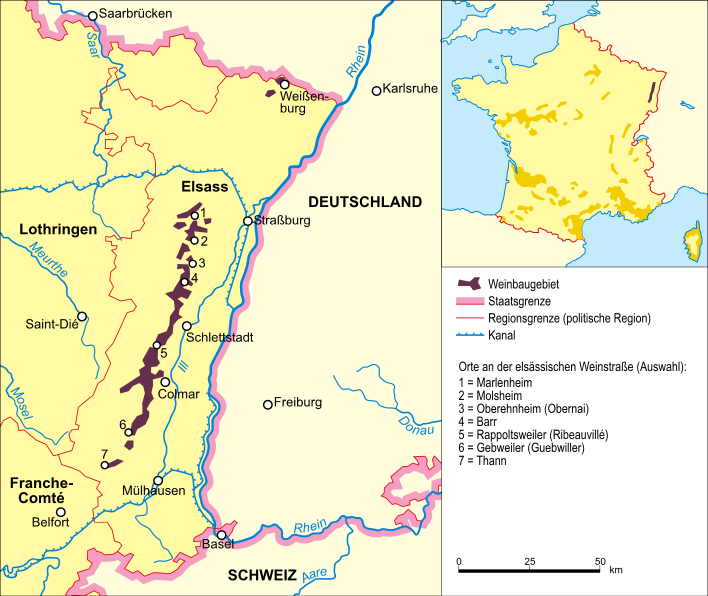
Map of Alsace with the location of the wine-growing region and some villages marked.

Alsace wine or Alsatian wine (French: Vin d'Alsace; German: Elsässer Wein; Haut Rhin Alsatian: d'r Wii vum Elsàss; Bas Rhin Alsatian: de Win vum Elsàss) is produced in the Alsace region in France and is primarily white wine. Because of its Germanic influence, it is the only Appellation d'Origine Contrôlée region in France to produce mostly varietal wines, typically from similar grape varieties to those used in German wine. Along with Austria and Germany, it produces some of the most noted dry Rieslings in the world as well as highly aromatic Gewürztraminer wines. Wines are produced under three different AOCs: Alsace AOC for white, rosé and red wines (pinot noir), Alsace Grand Cru AOC for white wines from certain classified vineyards and Crémant d'Alsace AOC for sparkling wines. Both dry and sweet white wines are produced.

In 2006, vines were grown on 15,298 hectares (37,800 acres) in 119 villages in Alsace, and 111.3 million litres of wine was produced, corresponding to 148.4 million bottles of 750 mL, generating 478.8 million euro in revenue. Of the vineyard surface, 78% was classified for the production of AOC Alsace wines, 4% for AOC Alsace Grand Cru, and 18% for AOC Crémant d'Alsace. About 90% of the wine produced is white. 25% of the production is exported, and the five largest export markets for still Alsace wine in terms of volume are Belgium, Netherlands, Germany, Denmark and the United States.

== Beer ==
Alsace is also the main beer-producing région of France, thanks primarily to breweries in and near Strasbourg. These include those of Fischer, Karlsbräu, Kronenbourg, and Heineken International, but also many microbreweries. Hops are grown in Kochersberg and in northern Alsace.

== Schnapps ==
Schnapps is also traditionally made in Alsace.
