= Bredele =

Traditional French Christmas biscuit

Bredela
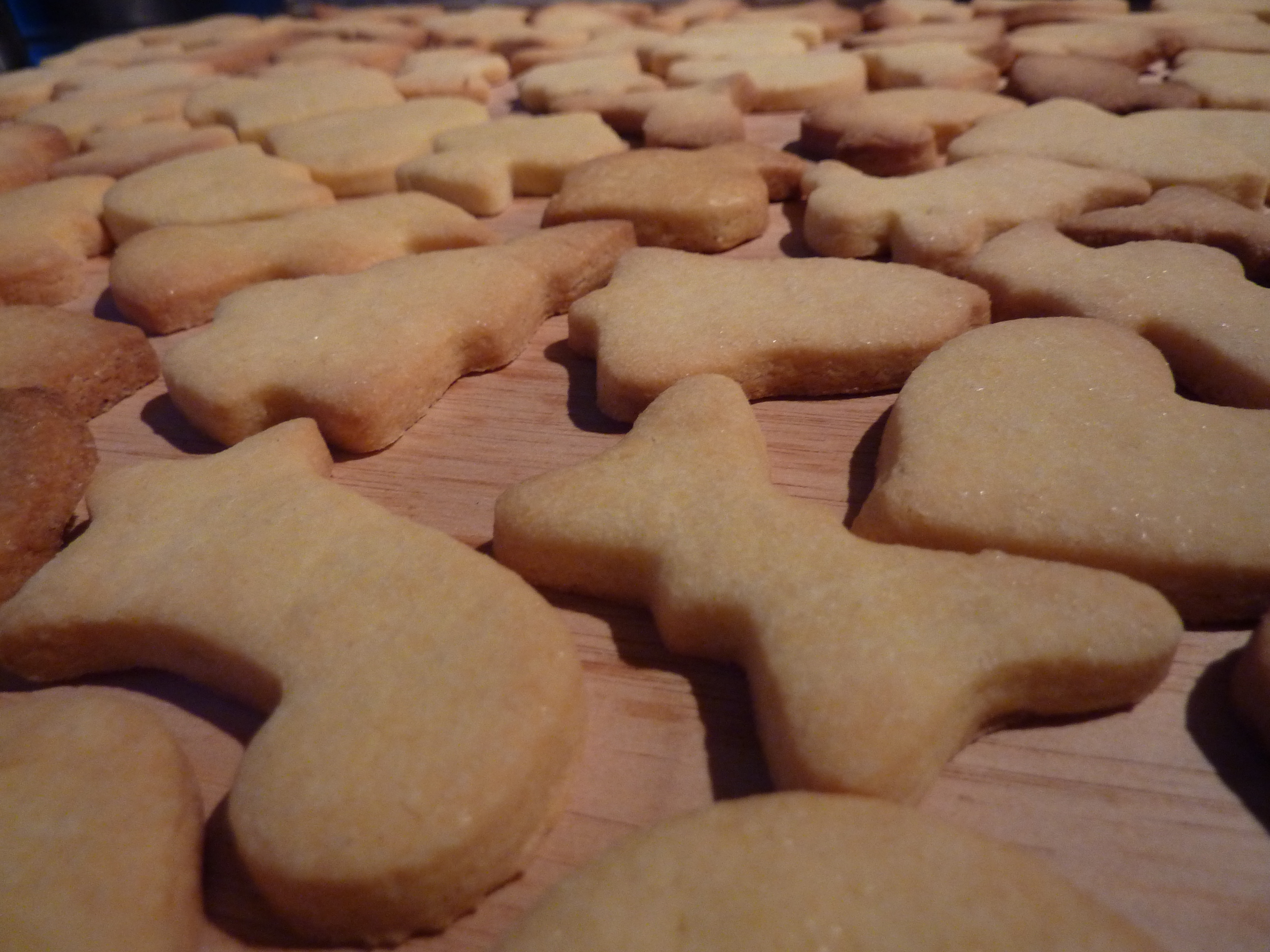
- Alternative names: Bredela, Bredle, Winachtsbredele
- Type: Biscuit or cake
- Place of origin: France
- Region or state: Alsace, Moselle

Bredele (also referred to as Bredala, Bredle or Winachtsbredele) are biscuits or small cakes traditionally baked in Alsace and Moselle, France and parts of Southern Germany, especially during the Christmas period. Many varieties can be found, including new ones, so that assortments can be created. They can include anisbredela (cake with egg white and aniseed) butterbredle, schwowebredle (orange and cinnamon), spritzbredle, small pain d'épices and spice cakes that are made with sugar rather than honey.

Baking Bredeles at Christmas is popular in Alsace. The tradition is for each family to bake its own, and then offer them as a Christmas gift to neighbours.

The word comes from Low Alemannic German, where it is a diminutive of the word for bread.

== See also ==
- Christmas cookies
- Alsatian cuisine
- Pain d'épices
