= Chocolate crinkle =

Chocolate cookie

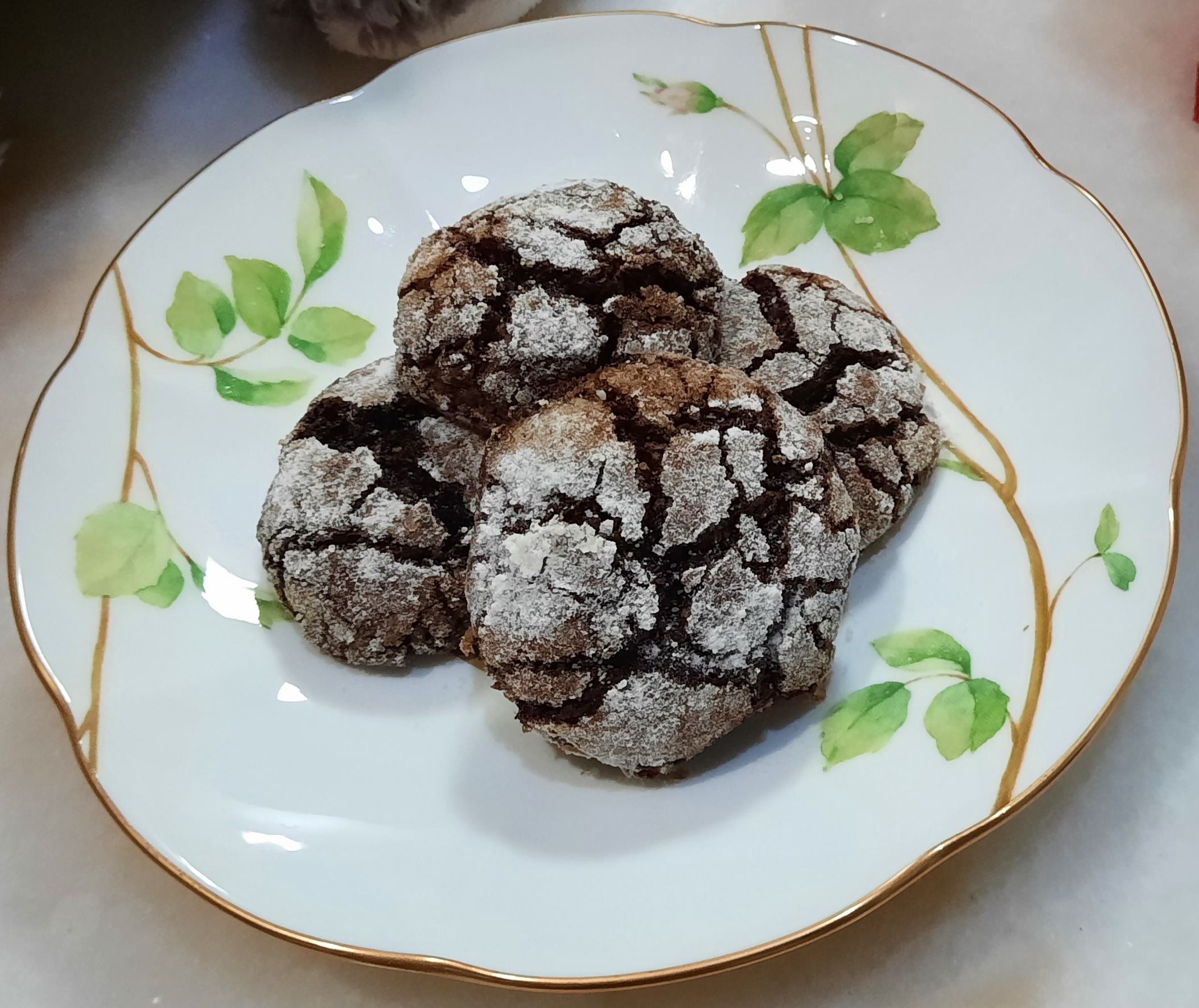
- Type: Cookie
- Course: Dessert, merienda, or snack
- Place of origin: Saint Paul, Minnesota
- Created by: Helen Fredell
- Invented: early 1950s
- Serving temperature: Warm, room temperature
- Main ingredients: Cocoa powder, powdered sugar, sugar, water
- Variations: Ube crinkle

Chocolate crinkles are a type of Christmas cookie that have a chewy, brownie-like interior and a crisp exterior. They are covered in powdered sugar and primarily taste of chocolate.

Chocolate crinkles may be made from cocoa powder or chocolate. Before baking, chocolate crinkles are typically refrigerated to prevent the dough being too sticky during handling. As they are baked, the surface breaks and the powdered sugar coating falls into cracks, an effect which gives the cookie its name. They are also known as black and whites and cookies in the snow. The powdered sugar's resemblance to snow has been credited as responsible for the cookie's popularity at Christmas.

The first recipe for a chocolate crinkle was published in a Betty Crocker cookbook in the early 1950s; it credits Helen Fredell from Saint Paul, Minnesota for its creation. Today chocolate crinkles are most popular in the Philippines where they are eaten year round. There, they have been the subject of research by the Department of Science and Technology into whether the cookies can be fortified with iron. Chocolate crinkles have repeatedly been the most searched cookies of varying states during the Christmas season in Google Trends data.

Variants include substituting the vanilla usually included for peppermint to invoke a flavour associated with Christmas. Chocolate crinkles with a coarser texture are achieved by using granulated sugar rather than powdered sugar. In the Philippines, a variant named ube crinkles are made by substituting chocolate flavours for purple yam.

== See also ==
- Macaron
- Chocolate crackles
- Chocolate chip cookie
