= Tarte à l'oignon =

Onion tart originating in France

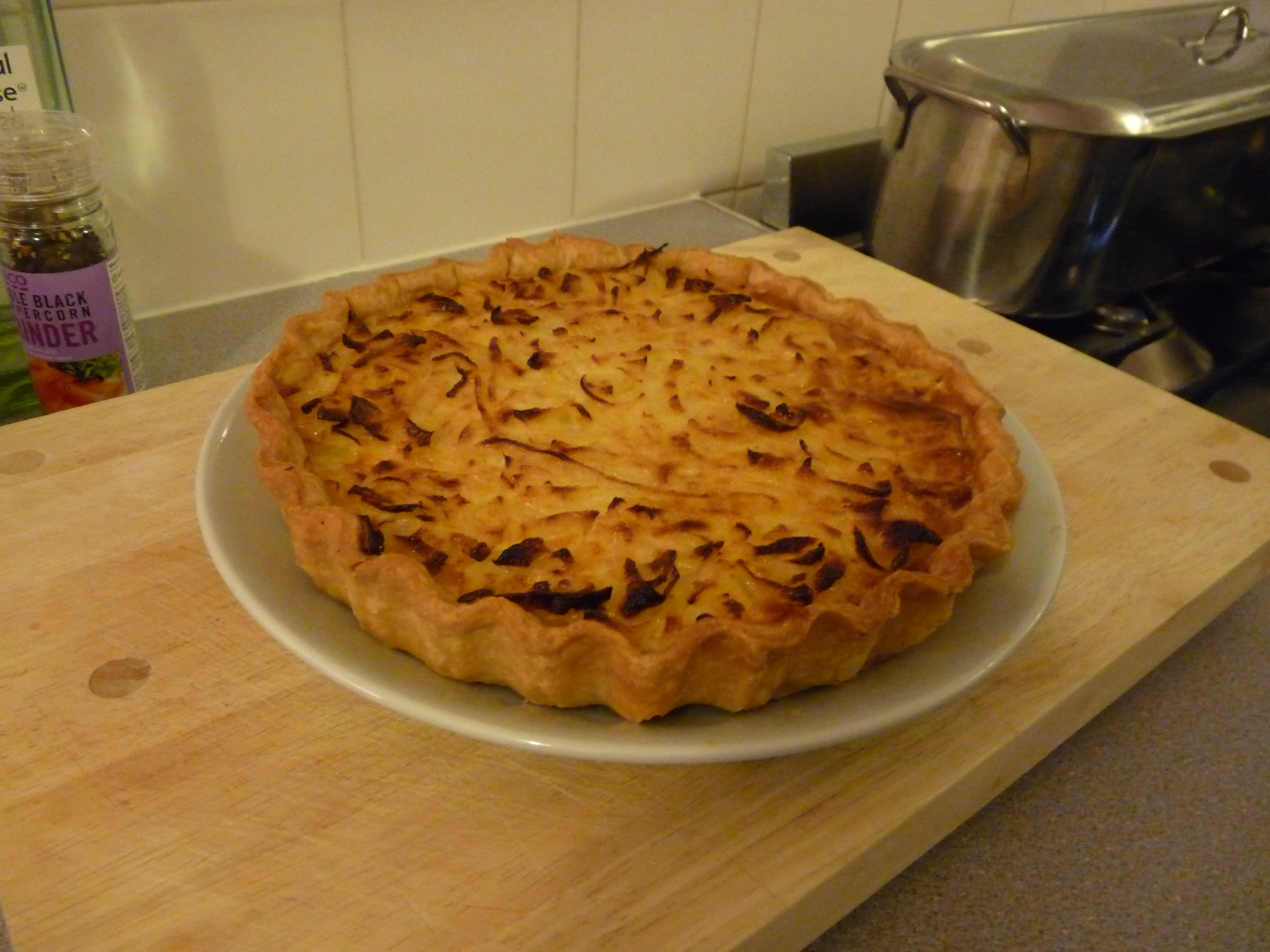
- Alternative names: Zewelwaï
- Course: Starter
- Place of origin: France
- Serving temperature: Hot, warm or cold
- Main ingredients: Onions, shortcrust pastry

Tarte à l'oignon or Zewelwaï is a savoury tart with a baked filling of onions and cream. It is a speciality of the French region of Alsace, and may be served hot, warm or at room temperature. It is typically served as a starter.

== Background and ingredients ==
Onion pastries are familiar in many French regions and elsewhere, including the Provençal pissaladière, Flemish flamiche and from Britain the Lancashire Butter pie. Elizabeth David singles out Zewelwaï as "the famous Alsatian speciality ... a truly lovely first course".

The onions are thinly sliced and, in most versions, slowly cooked in fat. Different cooks and writers specify various fats, including butter and oil (David), lard (Jane Grigson), beef dripping (Felicity Cloake), olive oil (Gilles Pudlowski), butter (André Soltner), and goose fat (Anne Willan). Larousse Gastronomique's Treasury of Country Cooking recommends simmering the onions in water; Gabriel Kreuther adds the onions raw to the filling.

The mixture to which the onions are added may contain cream, crème fraîche, whole eggs, egg yolks, and bacon. A variant made in the early months of the year, Zewelwaï printanière, substitutes spring onions for the usual brown ones. Most cooks blind bake the pastry case before adding the filling, although David does not. The pastry is generally shortcrust or a variant of it, but Larousse specifies puff pastry. The filled pastry case is then baked.

The cooked tart may be served hot, warm, or at room temperature.

== Sources ==
- Colmore, Julia, ed. (1977). Larousse Treasury of Country Cooking Around the World. London: Hamlyn. ISBN 978-0-600-35506-9. OCLC 1335731449.
- David, Elizabeth (2008) [1960]. French Provincial Cooking. London: Folio Society. OCLC 809349711.
- Willan, Anne (1981). French Regional Cooking. London: Hutchinson. ISBN 978-0-09-146211-6.
