= The Modern (restaurant) =

Restaurant in New York City

- Interactive map of The Modern

Restaurant information
- Established: 2005; 21 years ago
- Owner: Danny Meyer's Union Square Hospitality Group
- Head chef: Thomas Allan
- Food type: Contemporary
- Dress code: Business casual
- Rating: (Michelin Guide)
- Location: 9 W 53rd Street, New York City, New York, 10019, United States
- Coordinates: 40°45′40″N 73°58′36″W
- Website: www.themodernnyc.com

The Modern is a fine-dining restaurant owned and operated by Danny Meyer 's Union Square Hospitality Group. It is located in Midtown Manhattan, New York City, with garden views of the Museum of Modern Art. Thomas Allan is the Executive Chef, having been promoted in 2020.

The Modern first opened in January 2005 based on the French-American cuisine of Chef Gabriel Kreuther. There are three main dining areas, including the Main dining room, which overlooks the Abby Aldrich Rockefeller Sculpture Garden at the Museum of Modern Art (MoMA), as well as the Bar Room and The Kitchen Table. There is also a Seasonal Terrace.

== Menu ==
The Main Dining room offers two different tasting menus along with optional wine pairings.

== Architecture & design ==
Inspired by the Bauhaus movement, the restaurant is located at the intersection of MoMA's various buildings: the 1939 International Style Building by Philip L. Goodwin and Edward Durell Stone; the 1964 Philip Johnson addition; and Yoshio Taniguchi's 2004 building. The Modern has a luminescent glass wall and a 46 feet (14 m) marble bar floating above a lighted glass base, with a glass wine wall holding 2,200 bottles. The restaurant is furnished with Danish furniture and tableware from modernist designers including Arne Jacobsen and Hans Wegner.

== Art ==
The dining room overlooks 31 sculptures in the Abby Aldrich Rockefeller Sculpture Garden. The one piece of art hanging in the restaurant is a photograph entitled "Clearing" by German artist Thomas Demand.

== Awards and accolades ==
Since the debut of the Michelin Guide New York City, it has been Michelin-starred.

- 2006–2015, 1 Michelin star
- 2016–Present, 2 Michelin stars.
- 3 stars, The New York Times
- Wine Spectator Grand Award winner
- 4x James Beard Winner, including Best New Restaurant, Outstanding Wine Service, and Outstanding Restaurant Design.

== See also ==
- List of Michelin-starred restaurants in New York City
