= Fleischschnacka =

Alsatian dish

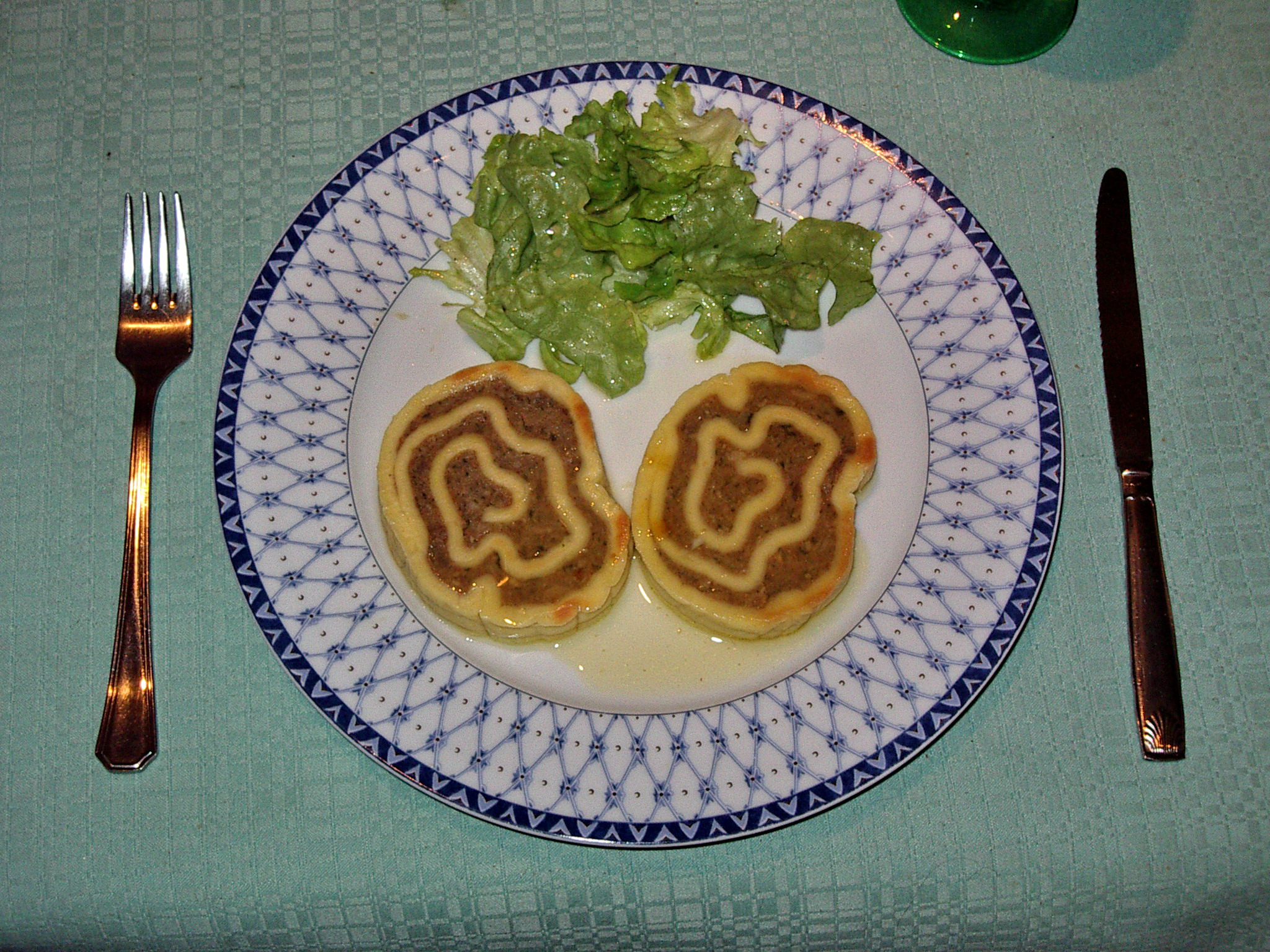
Fleischschnackas with green salad

Fleischschnackas (French pronunciation: [flaiʃ.ʃnaka]; Alsatian word, literally meat snail) are an Alsatian dish made from cooked meat stuffing (usually the remainders of pot-au-feu), eggs, onions, parsley, salt, pepper rolled in a fresh egg pasta.

The meat stuffing is spread on the fresh egg pasta and rolled. The tube obtained is then cut into slices of 1.5–2 cm, the Fleischschnackas. The slices are cooked on each face with butter in a frying pan then broth (usually pot-au-feu broth) is added and the rolls are cooked ca. 12 minutes.

Traditionally, Fleischschnackas are served with a small quantity of broth and a green salad.

== Etymology ==
Fleischschnacka literally means "snails of meat". It comes from words: Schnacka (snails) and Fleisch (meat).

A similar dish of meat-stuffed pasta, Maultaschen, is popular in Germany, particularly in the region of Baden-Württemberg which shares a border with Alsace. Maultaschen cut in half can resemble Fleischschnacka.
