= Gabriel Kreuther =

Chef and restaurateur

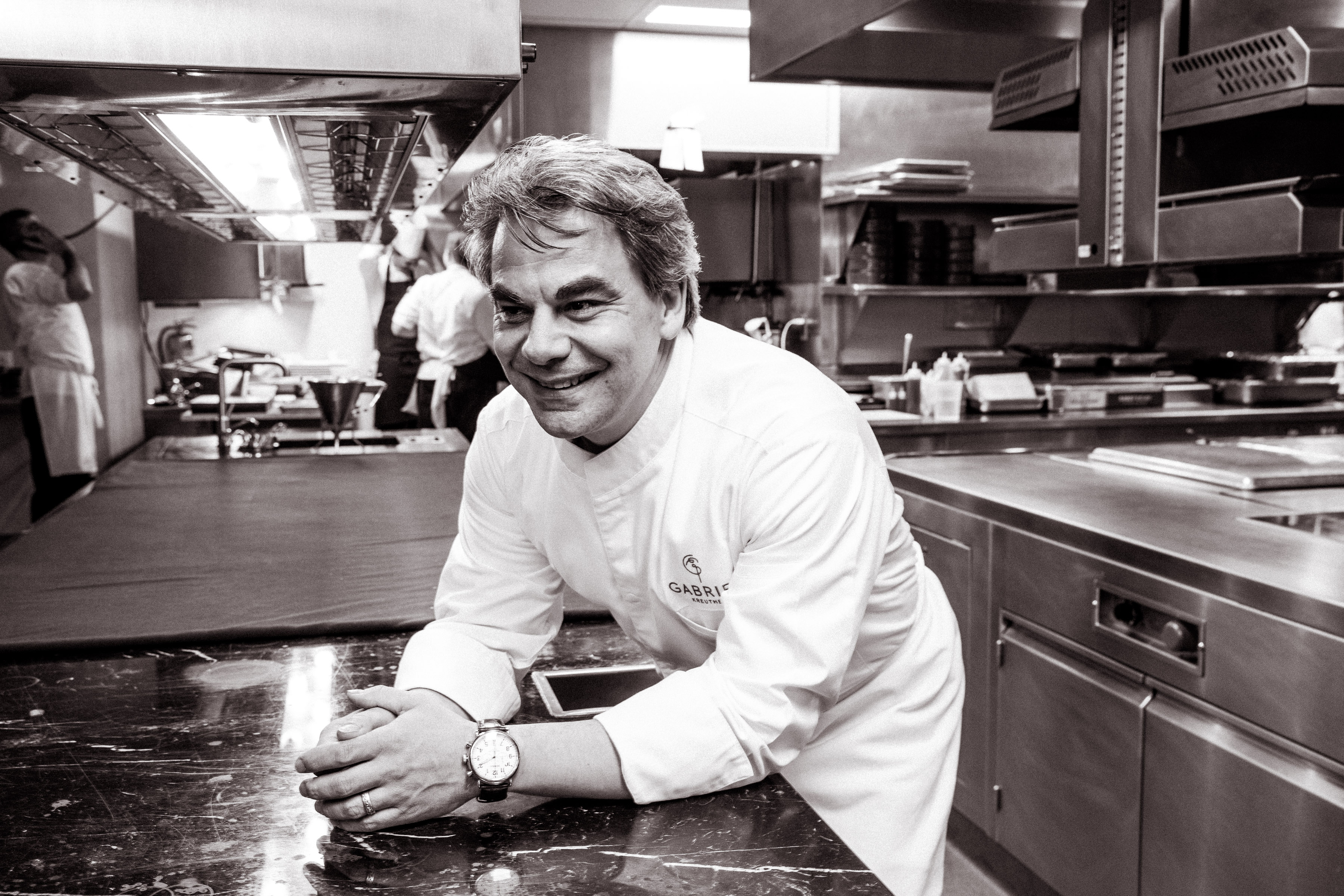
Gabriel Kreuther (2019)

Gabriel Kreuther is a professional chef and restaurateur who initially worked in restaurants across France, Switzerland, and Germany before moving to the United States. In the US, he worked at La Caravelle, a classic French restaurant, and as Chef De Cuisine at Atelier, a Mediterranean restaurant at the Ritz-Carlton. At his prior restaurant, The Modern, a Danny Meyer restaurant located inside the Museum of Modern Art, he worked as an executive chef. Gabriel gained the prestigious James Beard Award, his first Michelin star, and first worked with Marc Aumont, his current pastry chef. He was also named one of Food & Wine Magazine's Best New Chefs in 2003.

In November 2021, he collaborated with Michael Ruhlman to publish his first book, Gabriel Kreuther: The Spirit of Alsace, a Cookbook. The book contains recipes from his eponymous restaurant, memories of Alsace, and classics from Alsatian cuisine with a foreword by Jean-Georges Vongerichten. He currently runs two restaurants in New York, Gabriel Kruethner and Saverne at Hudson Yards.
