= Tirggel =

Swiss traditional Christmas biscuit

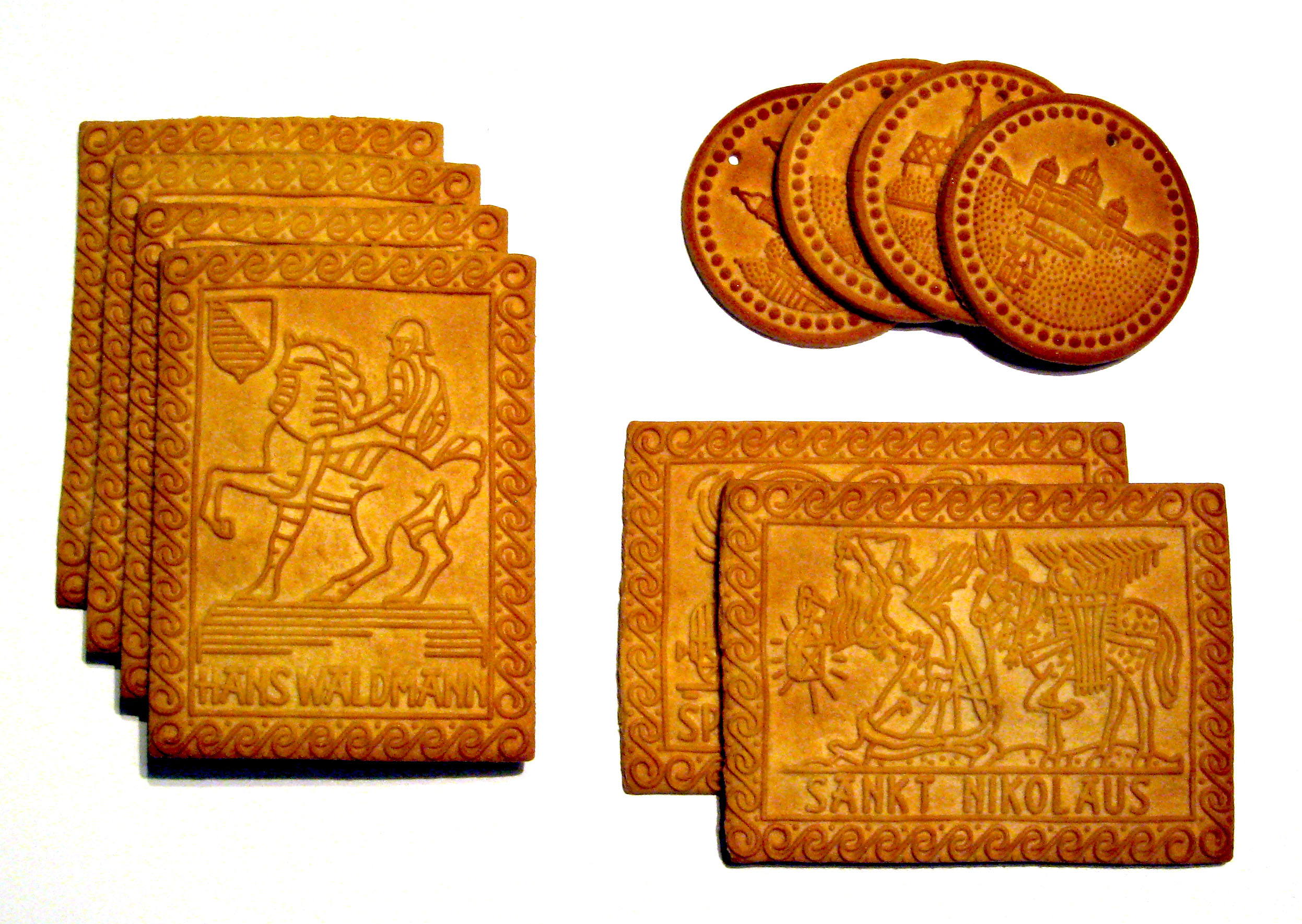
- Industrially manufactured tirggel as sold by Swiss retailer Migros in 2008
- Type: Biscuit
- Place of origin: Switzerland
- Region or state: Zürich
- Main ingredients: Flour, honey, sugar, water

Tirggel are traditional Christmas biscuits from Zürich, Switzerland. Made from flour and honey, they are thin, hard, and sweet.

== History ==
Tirggel are first recorded in Zürich as Dirgel in 1461. They have been manufactured there ever since with elaborately carved wooden moulds depicting Biblical or regional themes. More recently, the wooden moulds—four of which are exhibited in the Swiss National Museum—have been replaced by polycarbonate casts, which are easier to handle.

== Preparation ==
Tirggel dough is composed of flour, 29 percent honey, some sugar and water; although one source reports that it is or was made without sugar, which is taken to be an indication of the tirggel's pre-Christian origins.

The dough is pressed very thinly into elaborately carved moulds of varying shapes and sizes. The biscuits are baked in a high-temperature oven at 400 °C (752 °F) for only 90 seconds and require good timing to get right.

== Consumption ==
Because tirggel are hard and dry, they are best when sucked on for a while, which allows the honey flavour to become more pronounced.

Tirggel are also very durable. Swiss writer Emanuel Stickelberger reported in 1939 that "the tirggel has the admirable quality of not becoming stale, and the harder it gets, the more enjoyable is it to nibble on." On account of their elaborate ornamentation, traditionally manufactured tirggel are often not eaten at all for months or years and are kept as decorations instead.

== See also ==
- Culinary Heritage of Switzerland
